= 2022 FA Cup final =

Football match

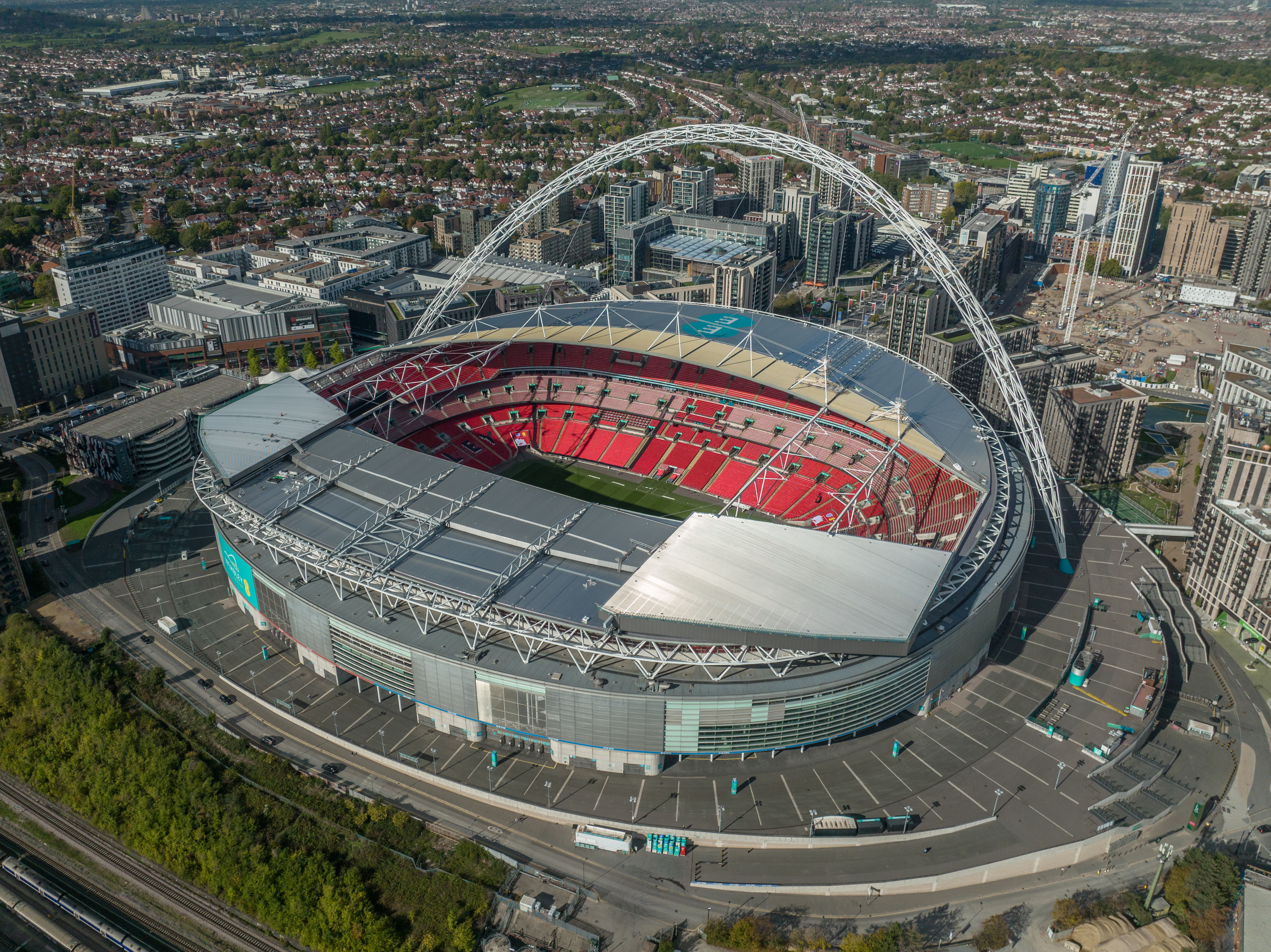
- The match took place at Wembley Stadium.
- Event: 2021–22 FA Cup
Chelsea	Liverpool
0	0
- After extra time Liverpool won 6–5 on penalties
- Date: 14 May 2022
- Venue: Wembley Stadium, London
- Man of the Match: Luis Díaz (Liverpool)
- Referee: Craig Pawson (Sheffield & Hallamshire)
- Attendance: 84,897
- Weather: Sunny

The 2022 FA Cup final was an association football match played at Wembley Stadium in London, England, on 14 May 2022. Chelsea and Liverpool were the finalists, the same as in the 2022 EFL Cup final earlier in the season. This was the first time that the same pair of teams met in both the EFL Cup and FA Cup finals of the same season since Arsenal and Sheffield Wednesday in 1993. Organised by the Football Association (FA), it was the 141st final of the Football Association Challenge Cup (FA Cup) and the showpiece match of English football's primary cup competition. The match also marked 150 years since the first FA Cup Final was played in 1872. The match was televised live in the United Kingdom on free-to-air channels BBC One and ITV (the first time since 1988 that both channels have simultaneously broadcast an FA Cup Final). In the UK, live radio coverage was provided by BBC Radio 5 Live and Talksport.

Liverpool won the trophy on penalties after the game remained goalless after extra time; it was the first final to finish goalless since 2005 and the first to go to penalties since Liverpool's previous victory in 2006 and the first FA Cup final held at Wembley to be decided by spot-kicks. Liverpool manager Jürgen Klopp became the first German-born manager to win the FA Cup. Chelsea set a record by losing a third consecutive final, after defeats to Arsenal and Leicester City in the 2020 and 2021 finals, respectively.

As current title holders, Liverpool qualified for the UEFA Champions League tournament by their position in the 2021–22 Premier League, the 2022–23 UEFA Europa League position went to the sixth-placed Premier League team, Manchester United.

== Route to the final ==
=== Chelsea ===
Chelsea's route to the final
Round	Opposition	Score
3rd	Chesterfield (H)	5–1
4th	Plymouth Argyle (H)	2–1
5th	Luton Town (A)	3–2
QF	Middlesbrough (A)	2–0
SF	Crystal Palace (N)	2–0
Key: (H) = Home venue; (A) = Away venue; (N) = Neutral venue

As a Premier League team, Chelsea entered the tournament in the third round and had the home advantage when they defeated Chesterfield 5–1 at Stamford Bridge. They had home advantage again when they faced Plymouth Argyle in the fourth round, but this was harder work, as they were held to a 1–1 draw in 90 minutes before César Azpilicueta scored the winner in extra time. In the fifth round away to Luton Town at Kenilworth Road, the home side took the lead twice in the first half, but goals from Timo Werner and Romelu Lukaku after the break put Chelsea through.

They had to travel again for the sixth round against Middlesbrough at the Riverside Stadium, where goals from Lukaku and Hakim Ziyech were enough to put them through to the semi-finals. Against Crystal Palace at Wembley, Chelsea scored twice in the second half to give them a 2–0 win and a third straight FA Cup final, their fifth in six seasons.

=== Liverpool ===
Liverpool's route to the final
Round	Opposition	Score
3rd	Shrewsbury Town (H)	4–1
4th	Cardiff City (H)	3–1
5th	Norwich City (H)	2–1
QF	Nottingham Forest (A)	1–0
SF	Manchester City (N)	3–2
Key: (H) = Home venue; (A) = Away venue; (N) = Neutral venue

Liverpool also entered the tournament in the third round, as one of the 20 Premier League teams. They were drawn against Shrewsbury Town at Anfield, and despite going 1–0 down, they came back to win 4–1. They made it through their fourth round tie at home to Cardiff City more comfortably, going 3–0 up before a late consolation for the visitors made it 3–1. A first-half brace from Takumi Minamino gave them a 2–1 win at home to Norwich City in the fifth round, holding off a second-half comeback. The sixth round gave them their first away draw of the competition, a trip to face Nottingham Forest at the City Ground, but Diogo Jota's 78th-minute goal was enough to see them through to the semi-finals. At Wembley, they took a 3–0 first-half lead against Manchester City, thanks to Konaté and a brace from Mané; Jack Grealish pulled one back for City early in the second half, but the only other goal came from Bernardo Silva in injury time, and Liverpool held on to win 3–2 and reach their first FA Cup final in 10 years.

== Pre-match ==
This was the sides' second meeting in an FA Cup final, having met in 2012, when Chelsea won 2–1. They also met in four other title-deciding matches; the 2005 and 2022 League Cup finals, the 2006 FA Community Shield, and the 2019 UEFA Super Cup; Chelsea won the 2005 meeting and Liverpool won the other three. The two teams had met earlier in the season, in the 2022 EFL Cup Final, with Liverpool winning on penalties, with both matches between the teams in the 2021–22 Premier League ending in draws, 1–1 at Anfield and 2–2 at Stamford Bridge. This was the first time that the same pair of teams met in both the EFL Cup Final and the FA Cup Final of the same season since Arsenal and Sheffield Wednesday in 1993.

== Match ==
=== Summary ===
In the 8th minute, Trent Alexander-Arnold passed into the path of Luis Díaz who ran in on goal and shot low from the left which was saved by Édouard Mendy and eventually cleared. In the 23rd minute, Christian Pulisic shot past the left post for Chelsea after a low cross from the right.

Chelsea had another chance in the 27th minute with Alisson getting down to block a shot from the left by Marcos Alonso. In the 47th minute, Alisson again got down to his right to save a shot from Pulisic. A minute later Marcos Alonso hit a free-kick from the right against the back left post. In the 83rd minute, Luis Díaz shot from the right of the penalty area which went wide off the outside of the right past. A minute later Andy Robertson hit a shot against the left post from close range after a cross from the right by James Milner. Luis Díaz curled another shot just past the right post in the 90th minute.

After no goals in extra time, the match went to a penalty shoot-out. The shoot-out took place at the east end of the stadium. César Azpilicueta hit the post with Chelsea's second penalty, which mean after four successful penalties by Liverpool, Sadio Mané had the chance to win the shoot-out; however, his penalty was saved by his Senegal international teammate Mendy down low to his left, forcing sudden death. After Hakim Ziyech and Diogo Jota dispatched their penalties, Alisson saved down to his left from Mason Mount, allowing Kostas Tsimikas to win it for Liverpool, sending Mendy the wrong way and shooting it low into the left corner.

=== Details ===
14 May 2022
16:45 BST

Chelsea	0–0 (a.e.t.)	Liverpool
	Report
Penalties
Alonso (penalty scored); Azpilicueta (penalty missed); James (penalty scored); Barkley (penalty scored); Jorginho (penalty scored); Ziyech (penalty scored); Mount (penalty missed)	5–6	(penalty scored) Milner; (penalty scored) Thiago; (penalty scored) Firmino; (penalty scored) Alexander-Arnold; (penalty missed) Mané; (penalty scored) Jota; (penalty scored) Tsimikas

Wembley Stadium, London
Attendance: 84,897
Referee: Craig Pawson (Sheffield & Hallamshire)

Chelsea	Liverpool

GK	16	(Senegal) Édouard Mendy
CB	14	(England) Trevoh Chalobah		(substituted off) 106'
CB	6	(Brazil) Thiago Silva
CB	2	(Germany) Antonio Rüdiger
RM	24	(England) Reece James	(yellow card) 77'
CM	5	(Italy) Jorginho (c)
CM	8	(Croatia) Mateo Kovačić		(substituted off) 66'
LM	3	(Spain) Marcos Alonso
AM	19	(England) Mason Mount
AM	10	(United States) Christian Pulisic		(substituted off) 106'
CF	9	(Belgium) Romelu Lukaku		(substituted off) 85'
Substitutes:
GK	1	(Spain) Kepa Arrizabalaga
DF	28	(Spain) César Azpilicueta		(substituted on) 106'
DF	31	(France) Malang Sarr
MF	7	(France) N'Golo Kanté		(substituted on) 66'
MF	12	(England) Ruben Loftus-Cheek		(substituted on) 106'	(substituted off) 120'
MF	17	(Spain) Saúl
MF	18	(England) Ross Barkley		(substituted on) 120'
MF	22	(Morocco) Hakim Ziyech		(substituted on) 85'
FW	11	(Germany) Timo Werner
Manager:
(Germany) Thomas Tuchel

GK	1	(Brazil) Alisson
RB	66	(England) Trent Alexander-Arnold
CB	5	(France) Ibrahima Konaté
CB	4	(Netherlands) Virgil van Dijk	(substituted off) 91'
LB	26	(Scotland) Andy Robertson	(substituted off) 111'
CM	8	(Guinea) Naby Keïta	(substituted off) 74'
CM	14	(England) Jordan Henderson (c)
CM	6	(Spain) Thiago
RF	11	(Egypt) Mohamed Salah	(substituted off) 33'
CF	10	(Senegal) Sadio Mané
LF	23	(Colombia) Luis Díaz	(substituted off) 98'
Substitutes:
GK	62	(Republic of Ireland) Caoimhín Kelleher
DF	12	(England) Joe Gomez
DF	21	(Greece) Kostas Tsimikas	(substituted on) 111'
DF	32	(Cameroon) Joël Matip	(substituted on) 91'
MF	7	(England) James Milner	(substituted on) 74'
MF	17	(England) Curtis Jones
FW	9	(Brazil) Roberto Firmino	(substituted on) 98'
FW	20	(Portugal) Diogo Jota	(substituted on) 33'
FW	27	(Belgium) Divock Origi
Manager:
(Germany) Jürgen Klopp

Man of the Match:
Luis Díaz (Liverpool)

Assistant referees:
Dan Cook (Hampshire)
Edward Smart (Birmingham)
Fourth official:
David Coote (Nottinghamshire)
Reserve assistant referee:
Dan Robathan (Norfolk)
Video assistant referee:
Paul Tierney (Lancashire)
Assistant video assistant referee:
Simon Bennett (Staffordshire)

Match rules

- 90 minutes
- 30 minutes of extra time if necessary
- Penalty shoot-out if scores still level
- Nine named substitutes
- Maximum of five substitutions, with a sixth allowed in extra time (Note: Each team was given only three opportunities to make substitutions, with a fourth opportunity in extra time, excluding substitutions made at half-time, before the start of extra time and at half-time in extra time.)

=== Statistics ===
First half
Statistic	Chelsea	Liverpool
Goals scored	0	0
Total shots	3	9
Shots on target	1	1
Saves	1	1
Ball possession	40%	60%
Corner kicks	0	2
Offsides	0	1
Yellow cards	0	0
Red cards	0	0

Second half
Statistic	Chelsea	Liverpool
Goals scored	0	0
Total shots	4	8
Shots on target	1	1
Saves	1	1
Ball possession	52%	48%
Corner kicks	1	2
Offsides	1	0
Yellow cards	1	0
Red cards	0	0

First half extra time
Statistic	Chelsea	Liverpool
Goals scored	0	0
Total shots	3	0
Shots on target	0	0
Saves	0	0
Ball possession	65%	35%
Corner kicks	4	1
Offsides	0	0
Yellow cards	0	0
Red cards	0	0

Second half extra time
Statistic	Chelsea	Liverpool
Goals scored	0	0
Total shots	0	0
Shots on target	0	0
Saves	0	0
Ball possession	41%	59%
Corner kicks	0	0
Offsides	0	0
Yellow cards	0	0
Red cards	0	0

Overall
Statistic	Chelsea	Liverpool
Goals scored	0	0
Total shots	10	17
Shots on target	2	2
Saves	2	2
Ball possession	47%	53%
Corner kicks	5	5
Fouls committed	13	12
Offsides	1	1
Yellow cards	1	0
Red cards	0	0
