= 2021–22 Liverpool F.C. season =

English football club season

Liverpool
2021–22 season
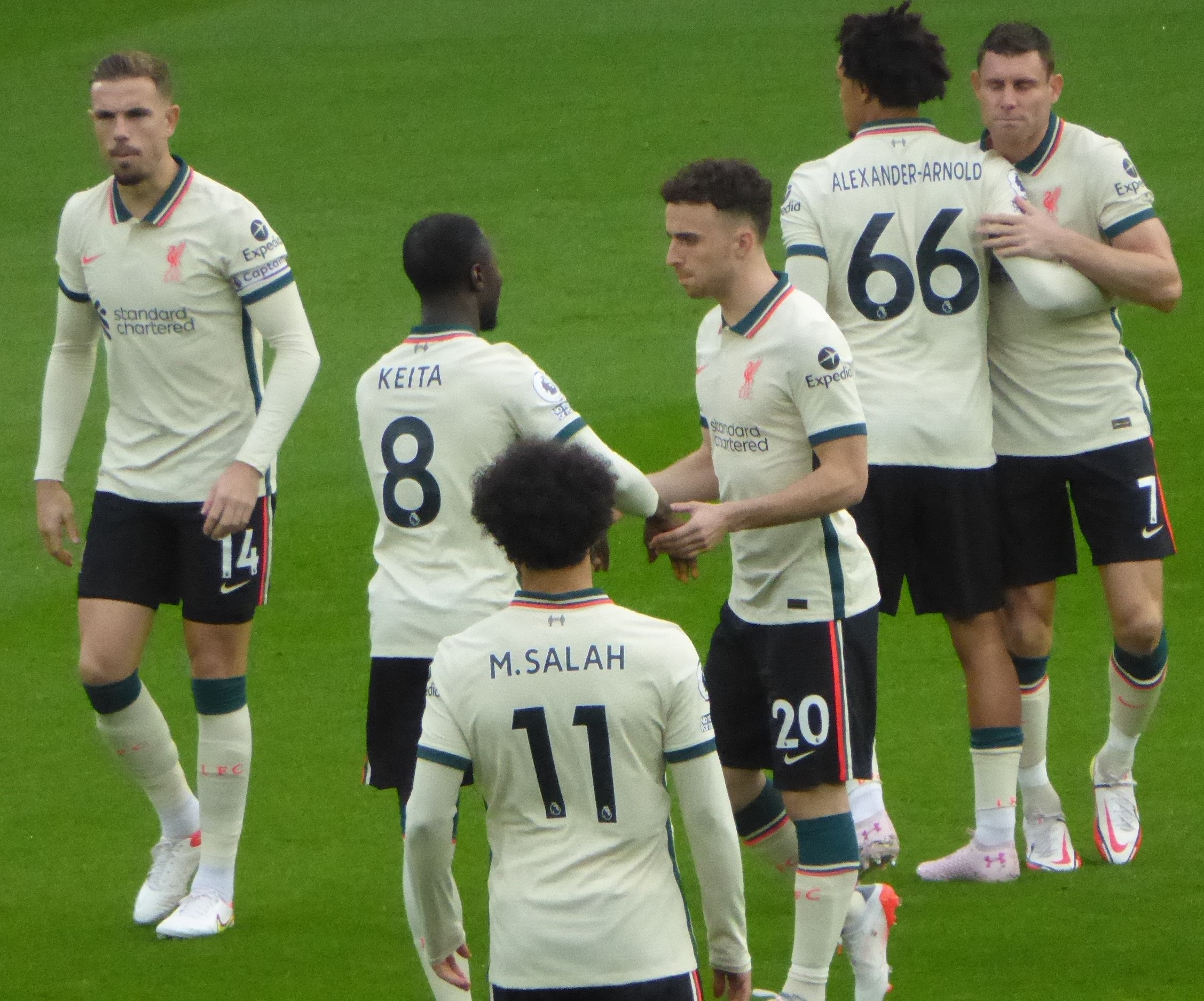
- Liverpool players during their Premier League match away to Manchester United, which they won 5–0.
- Owner: Fenway Sports Group
- Chairman: Tom Werner
- Manager: Jürgen Klopp
- Stadium: Anfield
- Premier League: 2nd
- FA Cup: Winners
- EFL Cup: Winners
- UEFA Champions League: Runners-up
- Top goalscorer: League: Mohamed Salah (23); All: Mohamed Salah (31)
| Home colours | Away colours | Third colours |

The 2021–22 season was Liverpool Football Club's 130th season in existence and their 60th consecutive season in the top flight of English football. Liverpool were on course to winning a unique quadruple, as they won a record-breaking ninth EFL Cup and the FA Cup, beating Chelsea on penalties in both finals. However, they lost the Premier League title by one point to Manchester City, and – in a repeat of the 2018 final – lost the Champions League final to Real Madrid. This was the first season since 2015–16 without Georginio Wijnaldum, who departed to Paris Saint-Germain and the first since 2017–18 without Xherdan Shaqiri, who departed to Lyon.

== Season overview ==
After an overall disappointing 20/21 season, they pursied all 4 trophies they competed in, they were just two victories away from winning all four major trophies. Liverpool began the 21/22 season with a 3-0 win away at Norwich, with goals from Diogo Jota, Roberto Firmino and Mohamed Salah. They went unbeaten for their first 10 Premier League games. During this period, they recorded two 5-0 wins away at Watford, and more notably Manchester United. This specific win was their largest victory at Old Trafford. In the Champions League, the side were drawn into the into Group B alongside FC Porto, Atlético Madrid and AC Milan. They went onto win all six games, becoming the first English side to do so.

The team’s form picked up significantly in the new year, after falling behind leaders Manchester City. They won ten consecutive league games between January and April, narrowing the gap to just one point before the teams met in a top of the table clash at the Etihad Stadium. The game ended 2-2, keeping the gap to just one. On the final day of the season, Liverpool faced Wolverhampton Wanderers at Anfield, while their title challengers Manchester City faced Aston Villa at the Etihad Stadium. Liverpool found themselves 0–1 down early in the match, however, City were also a goal down to Villa. Sadio Mané levelled the scoreline for Liverpool, and their title hopes were kept alive by the fact that City were now 0–2 down. However, City went on to score three goals in five minutes to take the lead and, despite Mohamed Salah and Andy Robertson scoring two late goals to beat Wolves 3–1, it was not enough and the Reds were pipped to the title by a point.

Liverpool excelled in both the FA Cup and EFL Cup. First, they beat Chelsea in February on penalties 11-10 after a goalless draw to win the EFL Cup, with goalkeeper Caoimhím Kelleher scoring Liverpool’s final penalty, before Chelsea’s keeper Kepa Arrizabalaga missed his attempt. Then in May, the teams met again in the FA Cup final. After yet another goalless stalemate, Liverpool won again on penalties, this time 6-5 with left back Kostas Tsimikas scoring the winning penalty.

In the Champions League knockout stage they advanced all the way to the final where they took on Real Madrid, as they had done four years earlier. In Paris, the same city in which the Reds won the European Cup against Madrid in 1981, they lost 0–1 as Vinícius Júnior scored the only goal of the game for Los Blancos.

== First-team squad ==
| No. | Player | Nationality | Date of birth (age) | Signed from | Apps | Goals | Assists |
Goalkeepers
| 1 | Alisson Becker | (Brazil) | 2 October 1992 (aged 29) | (Italy) Roma | 184 | 1 | 2 |
| 13 | Adrián | (Spain) | 3 January 1987 (aged 35) | (England) West Ham United | 25 | 0 | 0 |
| 22 | Loris Karius | (Germany) | 22 June 1993 (aged 29) | (Germany) Mainz 05 | 49 | 0 | 0 |
| 62 | Caoimhín Kelleher | (Republic of Ireland) | 23 November 1998 (aged 23) | (England) LFC Academy | 17 | 0 | 0 |
| 97 | Marcelo Pitaluga | (Brazil) | 20 December 2002 (aged 19) | (Brazil) Fluminense | 0 | 0 | 0 |
Defenders
| 4 | Virgil van Dijk (3rd captain) | (Netherlands) | 8 July 1991 (aged 30) | (England) Southampton | 181 | 16 | 7 |
| 5 | Ibrahima Konaté | (France) | 25 May 1999 (aged 23) | (Germany) RB Leipzig | 29 | 3 | 1 |
| 12 | Joe Gomez | (England) | 23 May 1997 (aged 25) | (England) Charlton Athletic | 142 | 0 | 5 |
| 21 | Kostas Tsimikas | (Greece) | 12 May 1996 (aged 26) | (Greece) Olympiacos | 33 | 0 | 6 |
| 26 | Andy Robertson | (Scotland) | 11 March 1994 (aged 28) | (England) Hull City | 224 | 8 | 52 |
| 32 | Joël Matip | (Cameroon) | 8 August 1991 (aged 30) | (Germany) Schalke 04 | 166 | 9 | 6 |
| 46 | Rhys Williams | (England) | 3 February 2001 (aged 21) | (England) LFC Academy | 19 | 0 | 0 |
| 66 | Trent Alexander-Arnold (4th captain) | (England) | 7 October 1998 (aged 23) | (England) LFC Academy | 226 | 12 | 60 |
Midfielders
| 3 | Fabinho | (Brazil) | 23 October 1993 (aged 28) | (France) Monaco | 170 | 11 | 7 |
| 6 | Thiago | (Spain) | 11 April 1991 (aged 31) | (Germany) Bayern Munich | 69 | 3 | 5 |
| 7 | James Milner (vice-captain) | (England) | 4 January 1986 (aged 36) | (England) Manchester City | 289 | 26 | 43 |
| 8 | Naby Keïta | (Guinea) | 10 February 1995 (aged 27) | (Germany) RB Leipzig | 116 | 11 | 6 |
| 14 | Jordan Henderson (captain) | (England) | 17 June 1990 (aged 32) | (England) Sunderland | 449 | 33 | 55 |
| 15 | Alex Oxlade-Chamberlain | (England) | 15 August 1993 (aged 28) | (England) Arsenal | 133 | 17 | 13 |
| 17 | Curtis Jones | (England) | 30 January 2001 (aged 21) | (England) LFC Academy | 74 | 8 | 9 |
Forwards
| 9 | Roberto Firmino | (Brazil) | 2 October 1991 (aged 30) | (Germany) 1899 Hoffenheim | 327 | 98 | 67 |
| 10 | Sadio Mané | (Senegal) | 10 April 1992 (aged 30) | (England) Southampton | 269 | 120 | 38 |
| 11 | Mohamed Salah | (Egypt) | 15 June 1992 (aged 30) | (Italy) Roma | 254 | 156 | 58 |
| 18 | Takumi Minamino | (Japan) | 16 January 1995 (aged 27) | (Austria) Red Bull Salzburg | 55 | 14 | 3 |
| 20 | Diogo Jota | (Portugal) | 4 December 1996 (aged 25) | (England) Wolverhampton Wanderers | 85 | 34 | 7 |
| 23 | Luis Díaz | (Colombia) | 13 January 1997 (aged 25) | (Portugal) Porto | 26 | 6 | 4 |
| 27 | Divock Origi | (Belgium) | 18 April 1995 (aged 27) | (France) Lille | 175 | 41 | 14 |
| 67 | Harvey Elliott | (England) | 4 April 2003 (aged 19) | (England) Fulham | 20 | 1 | 1 |

=== New contracts ===
| Date | Pos. | No. | Player | Ref. |
|---|---|---|---|---|
| 14 June 2021 | GK | 13 | (Spain) Adrián | |
| 24 June 2021 | GK | 62 | (Republic of Ireland) Caoimhín Kelleher | |
| 9 July 2021 | FW | 67 | (England) Harvey Elliott | |
| 30 July 2021 | DF | 66 | (England) Trent Alexander-Arnold | |
| 3 August 2021 | MF | 3 | (Brazil) Fabinho | |
| 4 August 2021 | GK | 1 | (Brazil) Alisson Becker | |
| 13 August 2021 | DF | 4 | (Netherlands) Virgil van Dijk | |
| 24 August 2021 | DF | 26 | (Scotland) Andy Robertson | |
| 31 August 2021 | MF | 14 | (England) Jordan Henderson | |
| 31 August 2021 | DF | 47 | (England) Nat Phillips | |
| 31 August 2021 | DF | 46 | (England) Rhys Williams | |

| Date | Coach | Ref. |
|---|---|---|
| 28 April 2022 | (Germany) Jürgen Klopp | |

== Transfers ==
=== Transfers in ===
| Date | Position | No. | Player | From | Fee | Ref. |
|---|---|---|---|---|---|---|
| 1 July 2021 | DF | 5 | (France) Ibrahima Konaté | (Germany) RB Leipzig | £36,000,000 | |
| 30 January 2022 | FW | 23 | (Colombia) Luis Díaz | (Portugal) FC Porto | £47,000,000 (Note: Fee may eventually rise to £50,000,000) | |
| Total | | | | | £83,000,000 | |

=== Transfers out ===
| Date | Position | No. | Player | To | Fee | Ref. |
|---|---|---|---|---|---|---|
| 1 July 2021 | FW | 53 | (England) Joe Hardy | (England) Accrington Stanley | Released | |
| 1 July 2021 | MF | 5 | (Netherlands) Georginio Wijnaldum | (France) Paris Saint-Germain | Released | |
| 3 July 2021 | GK | 73 | (Poland) Kamil Grabara | (Denmark) Copenhagen | £3,000,000 | |
| 8 July 2021 | FW | 41 | (Canada) Liam Millar | (Switzerland) FC Basel | £1,300,000 | |
| 20 July 2021 | MF | 16 | (Serbia) Marko Grujić | (Portugal) FC Porto | £10,500,000 | |
| 20 July 2021 | FW | — | (Nigeria) Taiwo Awoniyi | (Germany) Union Berlin | £7,850,000 (Note: Inclusive of 10% sell-on clause) | |
| 24 July 2021 | FW | 59 | (Wales) Harry Wilson | (England) Fulham | £12,000,000 | |
| 28 July 2021 | DF | — | (Algeria) Yasser Larouci | (France) ES Troyes AC | Released | |
| 23 August 2021 | MF | 23 | (Switzerland) Xherdan Shaqiri | (France) Olympique Lyonnais | £9,500,000 | |
| 4 January 2022 | DF | 77 | (Wales) Morgan Boyes | (Scotland) Livingston | Released | |
| 4 January 2022 | DF | 44 | (Scotland) Tony Gallacher | (Scotland) St. Johnstone | Released | |
| Total | | | | | £44,550,000 | |

=== Loans out ===
| Start date | End date | Position | No. | Player | To club | Fee | Ref |
|---|---|---|---|---|---|---|---|
| 1 July 2021 | End of season | DF | — | (England) Adam Lewis | (Scotland) Livingston | None | |
| 1 July 2021 | End of season | DF | 72 | (Netherlands) Sepp van den Berg | (England) Preston North End | None | |
| 2 July 2021 | End of season | FW | — | (Germany) Paul Glatzel | (England) Tranmere Rovers | None | |
| 10 July 2021 | End of season | DF | — | (Colombia) Anderson Arroyo | (Spain) Mirandés | None | |
| 16 August 2021 | 2 January 2022 | MF | 65 | (England) Leighton Clarkson | (England) Blackburn Rovers | None | |
| 16 August 2021 | End of season | DF | 28 | (England) Ben Davies | (England) Sheffield United | £500,000 | |
| 23 August 2021 | End of season | MF | 58 | (Wales) Ben Woodburn | (Scotland) Heart of Midlothian | None | |
| 31 August 2021 | End of season | MF | 64 | (England) Jake Cain | (Wales) Newport County | None | |
| 31 August 2021 | End of season | MF | 50 | (England) Luis Longstaff | (Scotland) Queen's Park | None | |
| 31 August 2021 | End of season | FW | 54 | (England) Sheyi Ojo | (England) Millwall | None | |
| 31 August 2021 | 20 January 2022 | DF | 46 | (England) Rhys Williams | (Wales) Swansea City | None | |
| 31 January 2022 | End of season | DF | 47 | (England) Nat Phillips | (England) Bournemouth | £1,500,000 | |
| 31 January 2022 | End of season | DF | 76 | (Wales) Neco Williams | (England) Fulham | None | |
| Total | | | | | | £2,000,000 | |

=== Transfer summary ===
Spending

Summer: ▼£ 36,000,000

Winter: ▼£ 37,500,000

Total: ▼£ 73,500,000

Income

Summer: ▲£ 45,050,000

Winter: ▲£ 1,500,000

Total: ▲£ 46,550,000

Net Expenditure

Summer: ▲£ 9,050,000

Winter: ▼£ 36,000,000

Total: ▼£ 26,950,000

== Pre-season and friendlies ==
On 12 July 2021, Liverpool announced that they would play four friendlies as part of a pre-season training camp in Austria. On 19 July, they stated that they would complete their pre-season campaign with two home friendlies. On 29 July, the Reds confirmed that they would face Bologna in two sixty-minute matches as part of a training camp in France in between the previously announced engagements.

Win Draw Loss Fixtures

| 20 July 2021 Friendly | Wacker Innsbruck | 1–1 | Liverpool | Austria |
| 18:00 CEST | Ronivaldo 17' | Report | Origi 5' (pen.) | Attendance: 0 |
Note: Thirty-minute mini-game

| 20 July 2021 Friendly | VfB Stuttgart | 1–1 | Liverpool | Saalfelden, Austria |
| 18:45 CEST | Förster 6' | Report | Mané 20' | Stadium: Saalfelden Arena; Attendance: 0 |
Note: Thirty-minute mini-game

| 23 July 2021 Friendly | Mainz 05 | 0–1 | Liverpool | Grödig, Austria |
| 18:15 CEST | | Report | Kilian 86' (o.g.) | Stadium: Greisbergers Betten-Arena; Attendance: 3,500 |

| 29 July 2021 Friendly | Liverpool | 3–4 | Hertha BSC | Innsbruck, Austria |
| 20:20 CEST | Mané 36'; Minamino 42'; Konaté (yellow card) 45+1'; Gomez (yellow card) 79'; Oxlade-Chamberlain 87' | Report | Ascacíbar 20'; Serdar 30'; Selke (yellow card) 45+1'; Jovetić 66', 80' | Stadium: Tivoli Stadion Tirol; Attendance: 15,000; Referee: Daniel Pfister |

| 5 August 2021 Friendly | Liverpool | 2–0 | Bologna | Thonon-les-Bains, France |
| 16:00 CEST | Jota 7'; Mané 14' | Report | | Stadium: Stade Joseph-Moynat; Attendance: 0 Referee: Jérémie Pignard |
Note: Sixty-minute mini-game

| 5 August 2021 Friendly | Liverpool | 1–0 | Bologna | Thonon-les-Bains, France |
| 18:00 CEST | Minamino 14'; Origi (penalty missed) 46' | Report | | Stadium: Stade Joseph-Moynat; Attendance: 0 Referee: Hakim Ben El Hadj |
Note: Sixty-minute mini-game

| 8 August 2021 Friendly | Liverpool | 1–1 | Athletic Bilbao | Liverpool |
| 16:30 BST | Jota 13' | Report | Berenguer 53' | Stadium: Anfield; Attendance: 40,000; Referee: Mike Dean |

| 9 August 2021 Friendly | Liverpool | 3–1 | Osasuna | Liverpool |
| 19:00 BST | Areso 14' (o.g.); Firmino 21', 41' | Report | Kike 70' | Stadium: Anfield; Attendance: 39,000; Referee: Craig Pawson |

| 15 August 2021 Friendly | Liverpool | 4–1 | Aston Villa | Liverpool |
| 15:00 BST | Origi; Williams; Jones; Gordon | Report | Traoré | Stadium: Anfield; Attendance: 0 |

== Competitions ==
=== Overview ===
| Competition | First match | Last match | Starting round | Final position | Record | | | | | | | |
| Competition | First match | Last match | Starting round | Final position | Pld | W | D | L | GF | GA | GD | Win % |
|---|---|---|---|---|---|---|---|---|---|---|---|---|
| Premier League | 14 August 2021 | 22 May 2022 | Matchday 1 | 2nd | 38 | 28 | 8 | 2 | 94 | 26 | +68 | 73.68 |
| FA Cup | 8 January 2022 | 14 May 2022 | Third round | Winners | 6 | 5 | 1 | 0 | 13 | 5 | +8 | 83.33 |
| EFL Cup | 21 September 2021 | 27 February 2022 | Third round | Winners | 6 | 3 | 3 | 0 | 10 | 3 | +7 | 50.00 |
| UEFA Champions League | 15 September 2021 | 28 May 2022 | Group stage | Runners-up | 13 | 10 | 1 | 2 | 30 | 14 | +16 | 76.92 |
| Total | | | | | 63 | 46 | 13 | 4 | 147 | 48 | +99 | 73.02 |

Source: Soccerway

=== Premier League ===
==== League table ====
| Pos | Team | Pld | W | D | L | GF | GA | GD | Pts | Qualification or relegation |
|---|---|---|---|---|---|---|---|---|---|---|
| 1 | Manchester City (C) | 38 | 29 | 6 | 3 | 99 | 26 | +73 | 93 | Qualification for the Champions League group stage |
| 2 | Liverpool | 38 | 28 | 8 | 2 | 94 | 26 | +68 | 92 | Qualification for the Champions League group stage |
| 3 | Chelsea | 38 | 21 | 11 | 6 | 76 | 33 | +43 | 74 | Qualification for the Champions League group stage |
| 4 | Tottenham Hotspur | 38 | 22 | 5 | 11 | 69 | 40 | +29 | 71 | Qualification for the Champions League group stage |
| 5 | Arsenal | 38 | 22 | 3 | 13 | 61 | 48 | +13 | 69 | Qualification for the Europa League group stage (Note: Since the winners of the 2021–22 FA Cup and the 2021–22 EFL Cup, Liverpool, qualified for the Champions League, the spot given to the FA Cup winners (Europa League group stage) was passed to the sixth-placed team and the spot given to the League Cup winners (Europa Conference League play-off round) was passed to the seventh-placed team.) |

Source: Premier League
Rules for classification: 1) Points; 2) Goal difference; 3) Goals scored; 4) If the champions, relegated teams or qualified teams for UEFA competitions cannot be determined by rules 1 to 3, rules 4.1 to 4.3 are applied – 4.1) Points gained in head-to-head record between such teams; 4.2) Away goals scored in head-to-head record between such teams; 4.3) Play-offs
(C) Champions

==== Results summary ====
| Overall | | | | | | | | Home | | | | | | Away | | | | | |
| Pld | W | D | L | GF | GA | GD | Pts | W | D | L | GF | GA | GD | W | D | L | GF | GA | GD |
|---|---|---|---|---|---|---|---|---|---|---|---|---|---|---|---|---|---|---|---|
| 38 | 28 | 8 | 2 | 94 | 26 | +68 | 92 | 15 | 4 | 0 | 49 | 9 | +40 | 13 | 4 | 2 | 45 | 17 | +28 |

Source: Soccerway

==== Results by matchday ====
| Matchday | 1 | 2 | 3 | 4 | 5 | 6 | 7 | 8 | 9 | 10 | 11 | 12 | 13 | 14 | 15 | 16 | 17 | 18 | 20 | 21 | 22 | 23 | 24 | 25 | 26 | 19 | 28 | 29 | 27 | 31 | 32 | 30 | 34 | 35 | 36 | 33 | 37 | 38 |
|---|---|---|---|---|---|---|---|---|---|---|---|---|---|---|---|---|---|---|---|---|---|---|---|---|---|---|---|---|---|---|---|---|---|---|---|---|---|---|
| Ground | A | H | H | A | H | A | H | A | A | H | A | H | H | A | A | H | H | A | A | A | H | A | H | A | H | H | H | A | A | H | A | H | H | A | H | A | A | H |
| Result | W | W | D | W | W | D | D | W | W | D | L | W | W | W | W | W | W | D | L | D | W | W | W | W | W | W | W | W | W | W | D | W | W | W | D | W | W | W |
| Position | 3 | 3 | 5 | 3 | 2 | 1 | 2 | 2 | 2 | 2 | 4 | 3 | 3 | 3 | 2 | 2 | 2 | 2 | 3 | 3 | 3 | 2 | 2 | 2 | 2 | 2 | 2 | 2 | 2 | 2 | 2 | 2 | 2 | 2 | 2 | 2 | 2 | 2 |
| Points | 3 | 6 | 7 | 10 | 13 | 14 | 15 | 18 | 21 | 22 | 22 | 25 | 28 | 31 | 34 | 37 | 40 | 41 | 41 | 42 | 45 | 48 | 51 | 54 | 57 | 60 | 63 | 66 | 69 | 72 | 73 | 76 | 79 | 82 | 83 | 86 | 89 | 92 |

Source: Premier League
W = Win; D = Draw; L = Loss

==== Matches ====
The league fixtures were revealed on 16 June 2021.

| 14 August 2021 1 | Norwich City | 0–3 | Liverpool | Norwich |
| 17:30 BST | Cantwell (yellow card) 53' | Report | Milner (yellow card) 25'; Jota 26'; Firmino 65'; Salah 74' | Stadium: Carrow Road; Attendance: 27,023; Referee: Andre Marriner |

| 21 August 2021 2 | Liverpool | 2–0 | Burnley | Liverpool |
| 12:30 BST | Jota 18'; Mané 69' | Report | | Stadium: Anfield; Attendance: 52,591; Referee: Mike Dean |

| 28 August 2021 3 | Liverpool | 1–1 | Chelsea | Liverpool |
| 17:30 BST | Salah 45+5' (pen.) | Report | Havertz 22'; James (red card) 45+3'; Rüdiger (yellow card) 45+3'; Mendy (yellow card) 45+5' | Stadium: Anfield; Attendance: 53,100; Referee: Anthony Taylor |

| 12 September 2021 4 | Leeds United | 0–3 | Liverpool | Leeds |
| 16:30 BST | Cooper (yellow card) 12'; Llorente (yellow card) 30'; Struijk (red card) 60' | Report | Fabinho (yellow card) 16', (goal) 50'; Salah 20'; Mané 90+2' | Stadium: Elland Road; Attendance: 36,507; Referee: Craig Pawson |

| 18 September 2021 5 | Liverpool | 3–0 | Crystal Palace | Liverpool |
| 15:00 BST | Henderson (yellow card) 40'; Mané 43'; Tsimikas (yellow card) 75'; Salah 78', (yellow card) 79'; Keïta 89' | Report | Ward (yellow card) 83' | Stadium: Anfield; Attendance: 52,985; Referee: Andy Madley |

| 25 September 2021 6 | Brentford | 3–3 | Liverpool | Brentford |
| 17:30 BST | Pinnock 27'; Onyeka (yellow card) 44'; Janelt 63'; Wissa 82' | Report | Jota 31'; Salah 54'; Jones 67'; Robertson (yellow card) 70' | Stadium: Brentford Community Stadium; Attendance: 16,876; Referee: Stuart Attwell |

| 3 October 2021 7 | Liverpool | 2–2 | Manchester City | Liverpool |
| 16:30 BST | Milner (yellow card) 42'; Mané 59'; Jota (yellow card) 65'; Salah 76'; Fabinho (yellow card) 83' | Report | Dias (yellow card) 26'; Cancelo (yellow card) 56'; Foden 69'; Silva (yellow card) 77'; De Bruyne 81' | Stadium: Anfield; Attendance: 53,102; Referee: Paul Tierney |

| 16 October 2021 8 | Watford | 0–5 | Liverpool | Watford |
| 12:30 BST | | Report | Mané 8'; Firmino 37', 52', 90+1'; Salah 54' | Stadium: Vicarage Road; Attendance: 21,085; Referee: Jon Moss |

| 24 October 2021 9 | Manchester United | 0–5 | Liverpool | Trafford |
| 16:30 BST | Shaw (yellow card) 41'; Ronaldo (yellow card) 45+1'; Fred (yellow card) 45+3'; Fernandes (yellow card) 46'; Maguire (yellow card) 55'; Pogba (red card) 60'; Wan-Bissaka (yellow card) 86' | Report | Keïta 5'; Jota 13'; Salah 38', 45+5', 50' | Stadium: Old Trafford; Attendance: 73,088; Referee: Anthony Taylor |

| 30 October 2021 10 | Liverpool | 2–2 | Brighton & Hove Albion | Liverpool |
| 15:00 BST | Henderson 4'; Mané 24'; Minamino (yellow card) 88'; Robertson (yellow card) 90+4' | Report | Mwepu 41'; Trossard 65'; Lamptey (yellow card) 90'; Duffy (yellow card) 90+2' | Stadium: Anfield; Attendance: 53,197; Referee: Mike Dean |

| 7 November 2021 11 | West Ham United | 3–2 | Liverpool | Stratford |
| 16:30 GMT | Alisson 4' (o.g.); Souček (yellow card) 45+7'; Fornals 67'; Zouma 74' | Report | Alexander-Arnold 41', (yellow card) 55'; Origi 83' | Stadium: London Stadium; Attendance: 59,909; Referee: Craig Pawson |

| 20 November 2021 12 | Liverpool | 4–0 | Arsenal | Liverpool |
| 17:30 GMT | Mané 39', (yellow card) 44'; Klopp (yellow card) 32'; Jota 52'; Fabinho (yellow card) 70'; Salah 73'; Minamino 77' | Report | Arteta (yellow card) 32' | Stadium: Anfield; Attendance: 53,092; Referee: Michael Oliver |

| 27 November 2021 13 | Liverpool | 4–0 | Southampton | Liverpool |
| 15:00 GMT | Jota 2', 32'; Thiago 37'; Van Dijk 52' | Report | Bednarek (yellow card) 11' | Stadium: Anfield; Attendance: 53,040; Referee: Andre Marriner |

| 1 December 2021 14 | Everton | 1–4 | Liverpool | Liverpool |
| 20:15 GMT | Townsend (yellow card) 16'; Allan (yellow card) 31'; Gray 38', (yellow card) 44'; Digne (yellow card) 40' | Report | Henderson 9'; Salah 19', 64'; Thiago (yellow card) 39'; Robertson (yellow card) 63'; Jota 79'; Van Dijk (yellow card) 80' | Stadium: Goodison Park; Attendance: 39,641; Referee: Paul Tierney |

| 4 December 2021 15 | Wolverhampton Wanderers | 0–1 | Liverpool | Wolverhampton |
| 15:00 GMT | Dendoncker (yellow card) 26'; Jiménez (yellow card) 88' | Report | Fabinho (yellow card) 62'; Robertson (yellow card) 66'; Origi 90+4' | Stadium: Molineux; Attendance: 30,729; Referee: Chris Kavanagh |

| 11 December 2021 16 | Liverpool | 1–0 | Aston Villa | Liverpool |
| 15:00 GMT | Van Dijk (yellow card) 13'; Salah 67' (pen.) | Report | Nakamba (yellow card) 19'; Watkins (yellow card) 24' | Stadium: Anfield; Attendance: 53,093; Referee: Stuart Attwell |

| 16 December 2021 17 | Liverpool | 3–1 | Newcastle United | Liverpool |
| 20:00 GMT | Jota 21'; Salah 25'; Henderson (yellow card) 70'; Alexander-Arnold 87' | Report | Shelvey 7'; Joelinton (yellow card) 45+2'; Fraser (yellow card) 55'; Hayden (yellow card) 86' | Stadium: Anfield; Attendance: 52,951; Referee: Mike Dean |

| 19 December 2021 18 | Tottenham Hotspur | 2–2 | Liverpool | Tottenham |
| 16:30 GMT | Kane 13', (yellow card) 20'; Emerson (yellow card) 28'; Winks (yellow card) 47'; Davies (yellow card) 58'; Son Heung-min 74' | Report | Morton (yellow card) 23'; Jota 35'; Robertson 69', (red card) 77'; Keïta (yellow card) 84'; Konaté (yellow card) 85'; Tsimikas (yellow card) 90+5' | Stadium: Tottenham Hotspur Stadium; Attendance: 45,421; Referee: Paul Tierney |
Note: Liverpool manager Jürgen Klopp was cautioned (yellow card) in the 39th minute for arguing with the referee.

| 28 December 2021 20 | Leicester City | 1–0 | Liverpool | Leicester |
| 20:00 GMT | Lookman 59' | Report | Matip (yellow card) 4'; Salah (penalty missed) 16' | Stadium: King Power Stadium; Attendance: 32,230; Referee: Michael Oliver |

| 2 January 2022 21 | Chelsea | 2–2 | Liverpool | Fulham |
| 16:30 GMT | Pulisic (yellow card) 17', (goal) 45+1'; Kovačić 42' | Report | Mané (yellow card) 1', (goal) 9'; Salah 26'; Konaté (yellow card) 83' | Stadium: Stamford Bridge; Attendance: 40,072; Referee: Anthony Taylor |
Note: Liverpool was managed by their assistant manager Pepijn Lijnders as Jürgen Klopp tested positive for COVID.

| 16 January 2022 22 | Liverpool | 3–0 | Brentford | Liverpool |
| 14:00 GMT | Fabinho 44'; Oxlade-Chamberlain 69'; Minamino 77' | Report | Ajer (yellow card) 19' | Stadium: Anfield; Attendance: 52,824; Referee: Jon Moss |

| 23 January 2022 23 | Crystal Palace | 1–3 | Liverpool | Selhurst |
| 14:00 GMT | Gallagher (yellow card) 51'; Édouard 55'; Hughes (yellow card) 61'; Schlupp (yellow card) 82'; Ward (yellow card) 90+3' | Report | Van Dijk 8'; Oxlade-Chamberlain 32'; Firmino (yellow card) 81'; Fabinho 89' (pen.) | Stadium: Selhurst Park; Attendance: 25,002; Referee: Kevin Friend |

| 10 February 2022 24 | Liverpool | 2–0 | Leicester City | Liverpool |
| 19:45 GMT | Jota 34', 87'; Firmino (yellow card) 50' | Report | | Stadium: Anfield; Attendance: 53,050; Referee: Chris Kavanagh |

| 13 February 2022 25 | Burnley | 0–1 | Liverpool | Burnley |
| 14:00 GMT | | Report | Henderson (yellow card) 26'; Fabinho 40' | Stadium: Turf Moor; Attendance: 21,239; Referee: Martin Atkinson |

| 19 February 2022 26 | Liverpool | 3–1 | Norwich City | Liverpool |
| 15:00 GMT | Mané 64'; Salah 67'; Díaz 81' | Report | Williams (yellow card) 40'; Rashica 48' | Stadium: Anfield; Attendance: 53,135; Referee: Mike Dean |

| 23 February 2022 19 | Liverpool | 6–0 | Leeds United | Liverpool |
| 19:45 GMT | Salah 15' (pen.), 35' (pen.); Matip 30'; Mané 80', 90+1'; Van Dijk 90+3' | Report | Firpo (yellow card) 18'; Ayling (yellow card) 33'; Gelhardt (yellow card) 90+2' | Stadium: Anfield; Attendance: 53,018; Referee: Michael Oliver |
Note: The match was originally scheduled for 26 December 2021, but was postponed at the request of both clubs due to a COVID outbreak in the Leeds squad.

| 5 March 2022 28 | Liverpool | 1–0 | West Ham United | Liverpool |
| 17:30 GMT | Mané 27', (yellow card) 90+5'; Jota (yellow card) 89' | Report | Dawson (yellow card) 31' | Stadium: Anfield; Attendance: 53,059; Referee: Jon Moss |

| 12 March 2022 29 | Brighton & Hove Albion | 0–2 | Liverpool | Brighton and Hove |
| 12:30 GMT | Bissouma (yellow card) 55'; Mac Allister (yellow card) 75'; Maupay (yellow card) 81' | Report | Díaz 19'; Salah 61' (pen.); Fabinho (yellow card) 84' | Stadium: Falmer Stadium; Attendance: 31,474; Referee: Mike Dean |

| 16 March 2022 27 | Arsenal | 0–2 | Liverpool | Holloway |
| 20:15 GMT | | Report | Jota 55'; Firmino 62', (yellow card) 63' | Stadium: Emirates Stadium; Attendance: 59,968; Referee: Andre Marriner |
Note: The match was originally scheduled for 26 February 2022, but was postponed due to Liverpool's participation in the EFL Cup final.

| 2 April 2022 31 | Liverpool | 2–0 | Watford | Liverpool |
| 12:30 BST | Jota 22'; Gomez (yellow card) 45+1'; Fabinho 89' (pen.) | Report | Hernández (yellow card) 59' | Stadium: Anfield; Attendance: 53,104; Referee: Stuart Attwell |

| 10 April 2022 32 | Manchester City | 2–2 | Liverpool | Manchester |
| 16:30 BST | De Bruyne 5'; Gabriel Jesus 36'; Silva (yellow card) 40' | Report | Jota 13'; Robertson (yellow card) 28'; Mané 46'; Thiago (yellow card) 61'; Fabinho (yellow card) 83'; Van Dijk (yellow card) 89' | Stadium: City of Manchester Stadium; Attendance: 53,197; Referee: Anthony Taylor |

| 19 April 2022 30 | Liverpool | 4–0 | Manchester United | Liverpool |
| 20:00 BST | Díaz 5'; Salah 22', 85'; Mané 68'; Keïta (yellow card) 86' | Report | Mejbri (yellow card) 88'; Fernandes (yellow card) 89' | Stadium: Anfield; Attendance: 52,686; Referee: Martin Atkinson |
Note: The match was originally scheduled for 20 March 2022, but was postponed due to Liverpool's participation in the FA Cup quarter-finals.

| 24 April 2022 34 | Liverpool | 2–0 | Everton | Liverpool |
| 16:30 BST | Mané (yellow card) 45+2'; Alexander-Arnold (yellow card) 58'; Robertson 62'; Origi 85' | Report | Gordon (yellow card) 25'; Doucouré (yellow card) 45'; Allan (yellow card) 66'; Alli (yellow card) 89'; Richarlison (yellow card) 90+1' | Stadium: Anfield; Attendance: 52,852; Referee: Stuart Attwell |

| 30 April 2022 35 | Newcastle United | 0–1 | Liverpool | Newcastle |
| 12:30 BST | Joelinton (yellow card) 43' | Report | Keïta 19'; Jota (yellow card) 43'; Gomez (yellow card) 51'; Mané (yellow card) 69' | Stadium: St James' Park; Attendance: 52,281; Referee: Andre Marriner |

| 7 May 2022 36 | Liverpool | 1–1 | Tottenham Hotspur | Liverpool |
| 19:45 BST | Tsimikas (yellow card) 69'; Díaz 74'; Fabinho (yellow card) 80'; Keïta (yellow card) 90+3' | Report | Davies (yellow card) 54'; Son Heung-min 56'; Sessegnon (yellow card) 70' | Stadium: Anfield; Attendance: 53,177; Referee: Michael Oliver |

| 10 May 2022 33 | Aston Villa | 1–2 | Liverpool | Birmingham |
| 20:00 BST | Douglas Luiz 3' | Report | Matip 6'; Mané 65' | Stadium: Villa Park; Attendance: 41,919; Referee: Jon Moss |
Note: The match was originally scheduled for 16 April 2022, but was postponed due to Liverpool's participation in the FA Cup semi-finals.

| 17 May 2022 37 | Southampton | 1–2 | Liverpool | Southampton |
| 19:45 BST | Redmond 13'; Tella (yellow card) 69'; Stephens (yellow card) 74' | Report | Minamino 27'; Matip 67' | Stadium: St Mary's Stadium; Attendance: 31,588; Referee: Martin Atkinson |
Note: The match was originally scheduled for 15 May 2022, but was postponed due to Liverpool's participation in the FA Cup final.

| 22 May 2022 38 | Liverpool | 3–1 | Wolverhampton Wanderers | Liverpool |
| 16:00 BST | Mané 24'; Matip (yellow card) 46'; Salah 84'; Robertson 89' | Report | Neto 3' | Stadium: Anfield; Attendance: 53,097; Referee: Anthony Taylor |

=== FA Cup ===
Liverpool were drawn at home to Shrewsbury Town in the third round to begin their participation in the competition.

| 9 January 2022 Third round | Liverpool | 4–1 | Shrewsbury Town | Liverpool |
| 14:00 GMT | Gordon 34'; Fabinho 44' (pen.), 90+3'; Firmino 79' | Report | Pennington (yellow card) 13'; Udoh 27'; Ebanks-Landell (yellow card) 79'; Daniels (yellow card) 89' | Stadium: Anfield; Attendance: 52,226; Referee: David Coote |

| 6 February 2022 Fourth round | Liverpool | 3–1 | Cardiff City | Liverpool |
| 12:00 GMT | Kelleher (yellow card) 46'; Jota 53'; Minamino 68'; Elliott 76' | Report | Vaulks (yellow card) 52'; Colwill 80' | Stadium: Anfield; Attendance: 51,268; Referee: Andy Madley |

| 2 March 2022 Fifth round | Liverpool | 2–1 | Norwich City | Liverpool |
| 20:15 GMT | Minamino 27', 39'; Jota (yellow card) 34'; Henderson (yellow card) 50' | Report | Byram (yellow card) 17'; Sargent (yellow card) 58'; Rupp 76'; Dowell (yellow card) 85' | Stadium: Anfield; Attendance: 52,231; Referee: Martin Atkinson |

| 20 March 2022 Quarter-finals | Nottingham Forest | 0–1 | Liverpool | West Bridgford |
| 18:00 GMT | | Report | Gomez (yellow card) 60'; Jota 78' | Stadium: City Ground; Attendance: 28,584; Referee: Craig Pawson |

| 16 April 2022 Semi-finals | Manchester City | 2–3 | Liverpool | Wembley |
| 15:30 BST | Gabriel Jesus (yellow card) 27'; Grealish 47'; Fernandinho (yellow card) 57'; Silva 90+1' | Report | Konaté 9'; Mané 17', 45', (yellow card) 61'; Fabinho (yellow card) 37'; Keïta (yellow card) 48' | Stadium: Wembley Stadium; Attendance: 73,793; Referee: Michael Oliver |

| 14 May 2022 Final | Chelsea | 0–0 (a.e.t.) (5–6 p) | Liverpool | Wembley |
| 16:45 BST | James (yellow card) 77' | Report | | Stadium: Wembley Stadium; Attendance: 84,897; Referee: Craig Pawson |
| | Penalties |
| | Alonso (penalty scored); Azpilicueta (penalty missed); James (penalty scored); Barkley (penalty scored); Jorginho (penalty scored); Ziyech (penalty scored); Mount (penalty missed) | | (penalty scored) Milner; (penalty scored) Thiago; (penalty scored) Firmino; (penalty scored) Alexander-Arnold; (penalty missed) Mané; (penalty scored) Jota; (penalty scored) Tsimikas |

=== EFL Cup ===
Liverpool entered the competition in the third round.

| 21 September 2021 Third round | Norwich City | 0–3 | Liverpool | Norwich |
| 19:45 BST | Tzolis (penalty missed) 42'; Lees-Melou (yellow card) 71'; Rupp (yellow card) 90' | Report | Minamino 4', 80'; Origi 50' | Stadium: Carrow Road; Attendance: 26,353; Referee: Darren England |

| 27 October 2021 Fourth round | Preston North End | 0–2 | Liverpool | Preston |
| 19:45 BST | | Report | Minamino 62'; Origi 84' | Stadium: Deepdale; Attendance: 22,131; Referee: David Coote |

| 22 December 2021 Quarter-finals | Liverpool | 3–3 (5–4 p) | Leicester City | Liverpool |
| 19:45 GMT | Morton (yellow card) 10'; Oxlade-Chamberlain 19'; Jota 68'; Minamino 90+5' | Report | Vardy 9', 13'; Maddison 33', (yellow card) 74'; Thomas (yellow card) 89' | Stadium: Anfield; Attendance: 52,020; Referee: Andy Madley |
| | Penalties |
| | Milner (penalty scored); Firmino (penalty scored); Oxlade-Chamberlain (penalty scored); Keïta (penalty scored); Minamino (penalty missed); Jota (penalty scored) | | (penalty scored) Tielemans; (penalty scored) Maddison; (penalty scored) Albrighton; (penalty missed) Thomas; (penalty scored) Iheanacho; (penalty missed) Bertrand |

| 13 January 2022 Semi-finals first leg | Liverpool | 0–0 | Arsenal | Liverpool |
| 19:45 GMT | Robertson (yellow card) 57' | Report | Xhaka (red card) 24'; Gabriel (yellow card) 72' | Stadium: Anfield; Attendance: 52,377; Referee: Michael Oliver |

| 20 January 2022 Semi-finals second leg | Arsenal | 0–2 (0–2 agg.) | Liverpool | Holloway |
| 19:45 GMT | Lacazette (yellow card) 44'; Tomiyasu (yellow card) 56'; Partey (yellow card) 87' (yellow-red card) 90' | Report | Jota 19', 77'; Konaté (yellow card) 63'; Jones (yellow card) 82'; Minamino (yellow card) 90+1' | Stadium: Emirates Stadium; Attendance: 59,360; Referee: Martin Atkinson |
Note: The match was originally scheduled for 6 January 2022, but was postponed due to a COVID-19 outbreak among Liverpool's players and staff.

| 27 February 2022 Final | Chelsea | 0–0 (a.e.t.) (10–11 p) | Liverpool | Wembley |
| 16:30 GMT | Kovačić (yellow card) 90'; Kanté (yellow card) 99'; Havertz (yellow card) 105+2' | Report | Alexander-Arnold (yellow card) 105+2' | Stadium: Wembley Stadium; Attendance: 85,512; Referee: Stuart Attwell |
| | Penalties |
| | Alonso (penalty scored); Lukaku (penalty scored); Havertz (penalty scored); James (penalty scored); Jorginho (penalty scored); Rüdiger (penalty scored); Kanté (penalty scored); Werner (penalty scored); Thiago Silva (penalty scored); Chalobah (penalty scored); Arrizabalaga (penalty missed) | | (penalty scored) Milner; (penalty scored) Fabinho; (penalty scored) Van Dijk; (penalty scored) Alexander-Arnold; (penalty scored) Salah; (penalty scored) Jota; (penalty scored) Origi; (penalty scored) Robertson; (penalty scored) Elliott; (penalty scored) Konaté; (penalty scored) Kelleher |

=== UEFA Champions League ===
Liverpool entered the competition in the group stage.

==== Group stage ====
The draw for the group stage was held on 26 August 2021, with the fixtures announced a day later.

| Pos | Team | Pld | W | D | L | GF | GA | GD | Pts | Qualification | LIV | ATM | POR | MIL |
|---|---|---|---|---|---|---|---|---|---|---|---|---|---|---|
| 1 | (England) Liverpool | 6 | 6 | 0 | 0 | 17 | 6 | +11 | 18 | Advance to knockout phase | — | 2–0 | 2–0 | 3–2 |
| 2 | (Spain) Atlético Madrid | 6 | 2 | 1 | 3 | 7 | 8 | −1 | 7 | Advance to knockout phase | 2–3 | — | 0–0 | 0–1 |
| 3 | (Portugal) Porto | 6 | 1 | 2 | 3 | 4 | 11 | −7 | 5 | Transfer to Europa League | 1–5 | 1–3 | — | 1–0 |
| 4 | (Italy) Milan | 6 | 1 | 1 | 4 | 6 | 9 | −3 | 4 | | 1–2 | 1–2 | 1–1 | — |

Source: UEFA
Rules for classification: Group stage tiebreakers

| 15 September 2021 1 | Liverpool (England) | 3–2 | (Italy) Milan | Liverpool, England |
| 21:00 CEST (UTC+2) | Tomori 9' (o.g.); Salah (penalty missed) 14', 48'; Henderson 69'; Milner (yellow card) 90+3' | Report | Bennacer (yellow card) 13'; Rebić 42'; Brahim 44', (yellow card) 61' | Stadium: Anfield; Attendance: 51,445; Referee: Szymon Marciniak (Poland) |

| 28 September 2021 2 | Porto (Portugal) | 1–5 | (England) Liverpool | Porto, Portugal |
| 21:00 CEST (UTC+2) | Taremi 75' | Report | Salah 18', 60'; Mané 45'; Firmino 77', 81' | Stadium: Estádio do Dragão; Attendance: 23,520; Referee: Sergei Karasev (Russia) |

| 19 October 2021 3 | Atlético Madrid (Spain) | 2–3 | (England) Liverpool | Madrid, Spain |
| 21:00 CEST (UTC+2) | Griezmann 20', 34', (red card) 52'; Suárez (yellow card) 90+5' | Report | Salah 8', 76' (pen.); Keïta 13'; Milner (yellow card) 59'; Alexander-Arnold (yellow card) 63' | Stadium: Wanda Metropolitano; Attendance: 60,725; Referee: Daniel Siebert (Germany) |

| 3 November 2021 4 | Liverpool (England) | 2–0 | (Spain) Atlético Madrid | Liverpool, England |
| 20:00 GMT (UTC±0) | Jota 13', (yellow card) 85'; Mané (yellow card) 15', (goal) 21'; Matip (yellow card) 90+2' | Report | Hermoso (yellow card) 8'; Felipe (red card) 36'; Suárez (yellow card) 37'; Koke (yellow card) 38'; Félix (yellow card) 52' | Stadium: Anfield; Attendance: 51,347; Referee: Danny Makkelie (Netherlands) |

| 24 November 2021 5 | Liverpool (England) | 2–0 | (Portugal) Porto | Liverpool, England |
| 20:00 GMT (UTC±0) | Konaté (yellow card) 29'; Thiago 52'; Salah 70'; Milner (yellow card) 88' | Report | Uribe (yellow card) 40'; Mbemba (yellow card) 75' | Stadium: Anfield; Attendance: 52,209; Referee: Felix Zwayer (Germany) |

| 7 December 2021 6 | Milan (Italy) | 1–2 | (England) Liverpool | Milan, Italy |
| 21:00 CET (UTC+1) | Tomori 29' | Report | Salah 36'; Origi 55' | Stadium: San Siro; Attendance: 56,237; Referee: Danny Makkelie (Netherlands) |

==== Knockout phase ====
===== Round of 16 =====
The draw for the round of 16 took place on 13 December 2021 at UEFA's headquarters in Nyon, Switzerland. Liverpool were drawn against reigning Serie A champions Inter Milan.

| 16 February 2022 First leg | Inter Milan (Italy) | 0–2 | (England) Liverpool | Milan, Italy |
| 21:00 CET (UTC+1) | | Report | Firmino 75'; Salah 83' | Stadium: San Siro; Attendance: 37,918; Referee: Szymon Marciniak (Poland) |

| 8 March 2022 Second leg | Liverpool (England) | 0–1 (2–1 agg.) | (Italy) Inter Milan | Liverpool, England |
| 21:00 CET (UTC+1) | Jota (yellow card) 40'; Robertson (yellow card) 47'; Mané (yellow card) 71' | Report | Sánchez (yellow card) 45+4' (yellow-red card) 63'; Vidal (yellow card) 45+6'; Martínez 62'; Bastoni (yellow card) 85'; Gagliardini (yellow card) 90+4' | Stadium: Anfield; Attendance: 51,747; Referee: Antonio Mateu Lahoz (Spain) |

===== Quarter-finals =====
The draw for the quarter-finals was held on 18 March 2022, with Liverpool being paired with Benfica.

| 5 April 2022 First leg | Benfica (Portugal) | 1–3 | (England) Liverpool | Lisbon, Portugal |
| 20:00 WEST (UTC+1) | Núñez 49'; Taarabt (yellow card) 63' | Report | Konaté 17'; Mané 34'; Thiago (yellow card) 58'; Díaz 87' | Stadium: Estádio da Luz; Attendance: 59,633; Referee: Jesús Gil Manzano (Spain) |

| 13 April 2022 Second leg | Liverpool (England) | 3–3 (6–4 agg.) | (Portugal) Benfica | Liverpool, England |
| 20:00 BST (UTC+1) | Konaté 22'; Firmino 55', 65' | Report | Ramos 32'; Yaremchuk 73'; Núñez 83' | Stadium: Anfield; Attendance: 51,737; Referee: Serdar Gözübüyük (Netherlands) |

===== Semi-finals =====
The draw for the semi-finals was held on 18 March 2022, after the quarter-finals draw, with Liverpool being drawn against Villarreal, reigning Europa League champions.

| 27 April 2022 First leg | Liverpool (England) | 2–0 | (Spain) Villarreal | Liverpool, England |
| 20:00 BST (UTC+1) | Van Dijk (yellow card) 32'; Estupiñán 53' (o.g.); Mané 55' | Report | Estupiñán (yellow card) 47'; Lo Celso (yellow card) 62' | Stadium: Anfield; Attendance: 51,586; Referee: Szymon Marciniak (Poland) |

| 3 May 2022 Second leg | Villarreal (Spain) | 2–3 (2–5 agg.) | (England) Liverpool | Villarreal, Spain |
| 21:00 CEST (UTC+2) | Dia 3'; Coquelin 41'; Capoue (yellow card) 63' (yellow-red card) 86'; Lo Celso (yellow card) 81'; Torres (yellow card) 85' | Report | Fabinho 62'; Díaz 67'; Mané 74'; Alexander-Arnold (yellow card) 77' | Stadium: Estadio de la Cerámica; Attendance: 23,665; Referee: Danny Makkelie (Netherlands) |

===== Final =====
The final was held on 28 May 2022 in Paris, with Liverpool facing 13-time winners Real Madrid. This was Liverpool's tenth European Cup final, the most of any English club, and third in five years; it was a rematch of the 2018 final, which Liverpool lost 1–3.

| 28 May 2022 Final | Liverpool (England) | 0–1 | (Spain) Real Madrid | Saint-Denis, France |
| 21:36 CEST (UTC+2) | Fabinho (yellow card) 62' | Report | Vinícius 59' | Stadium: Stade de France; Attendance: 75,000; Referee: Clément Turpin (France) |
Note: The match was originally scheduled for 21:00, but was delayed to 21:36 due to security issues with fans entering the stadium.

== Squad statistics ==
=== Appearances ===
Players with no appearances are not included on the list.

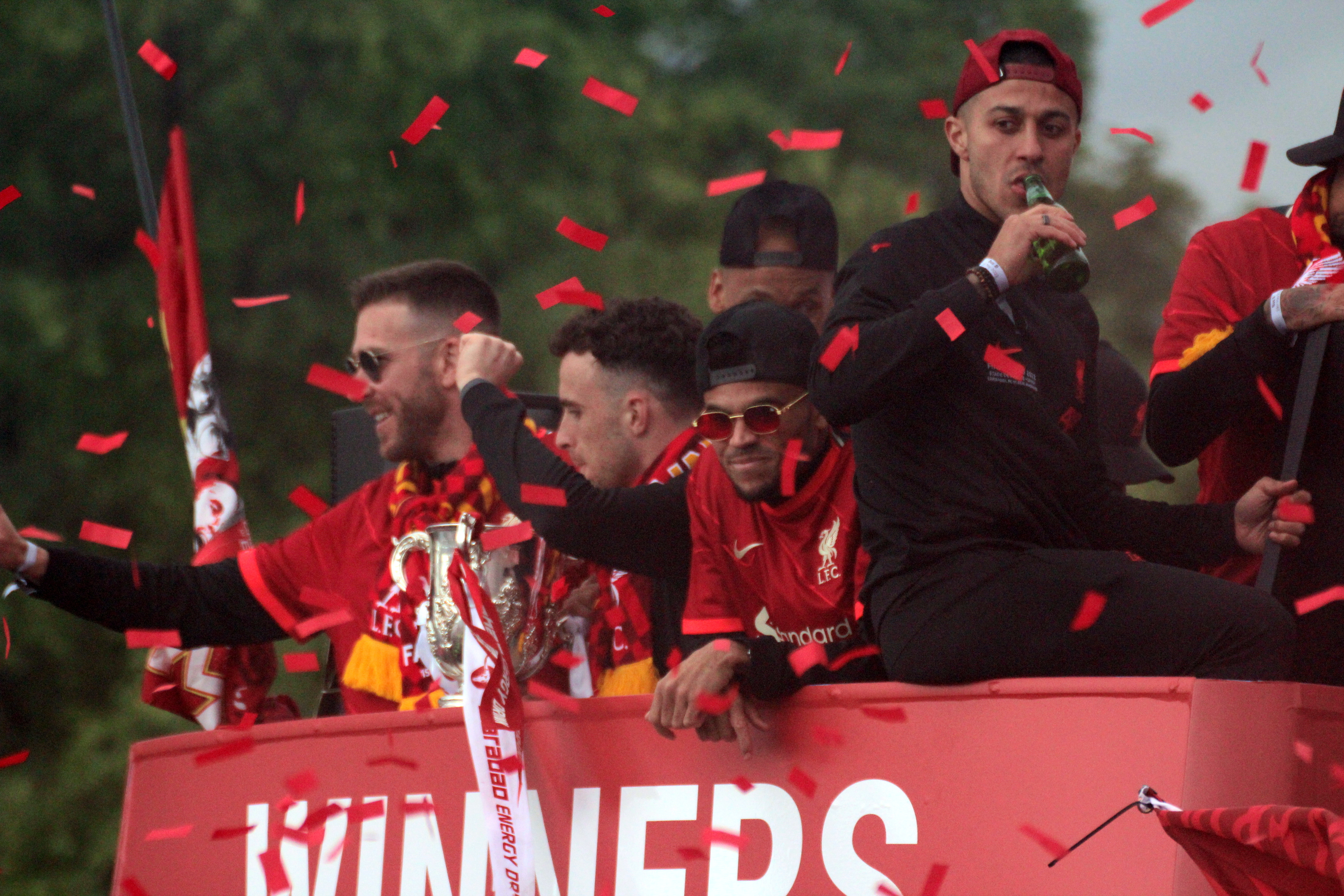
Liverpool players celebrating during a cup double parade

| No. | Pos. | Nat. | Player | Premier League | | FA Cup | | EFL Cup | | Champions League | | Total | |
| No. | Pos. | Nat. | Player | Apps | Starts | Apps | Starts | Apps | Starts | Apps | Starts | Apps | Starts |
|---|---|---|---|---|---|---|---|---|---|---|---|---|---|
| 1 | GK | (Brazil) | Alisson | 36 | 36 | 4 | 4 | 1 | 1 | 13 | 13 | 54 | 54 |
| 3 | DM/CM/CB | (Brazil) | Fabinho | 29 | 26 | 3 | 3 | 3 | 3 | 13 | 9 | 48 | 41 |
| 4 | CB | (Netherlands) | Virgil van Dijk | 34 | 34 | 5 | 5 | 3 | 3 | 9 | 9 | 51 | 51 |
| 5 | CB | (France) | Ibrahima Konaté | 11 | 11 | 6 | 6 | 4 | 1 | 8 | 8 | 29 | 26 |
| 6 | CM/DM | (Spain) | Thiago | 25 | 17 | 4 | 2 | 0 | 0 | 10 | 7 | 39 | 26 |
| 7 | CM/RWB/LWB | (England) | James Milner | 24 | 9 | 3 | 1 | 4 | 1 | 8 | 3 | 39 | 14 |
| 8 | CM/AM | (Guinea) | Naby Keïta | 23 | 14 | 4 | 4 | 3 | 2 | 10 | 5 | 40 | 25 |
| 9 | CF/SS/AM | (Brazil) | Roberto Firmino | 20 | 10 | 5 | 2 | 3 | 3 | 7 | 2 | 35 | 17 |
| 10 | LW/RW/CF | (Senegal) | Sadio Mané | 34 | 32 | 3 | 2 | 1 | 1 | 13 | 11 | 51 | 46 |
| 11 | RW/SS | (Egypt) | Mohamed Salah | 35 | 30 | 2 | 2 | 1 | 1 | 13 | 12 | 51 | 45 |
| 12 | CB/RB/LB | (England) | Joe Gomez | 8 | 4 | 2 | 2 | 4 | 3 | 7 | 2 | 21 | 11 |
| 13 | GK | (Spain) | Adrián | 0 | 0 | 0 | 0 | 1 | 1 | 0 | 0 | 1 | 1 |
| 14 | DM/CM | (England) | Jordan Henderson | 35 | 29 | 5 | 3 | 5 | 4 | 12 | 7 | 57 | 43 |
| 15 | AM/CM/RW | (England) | Alex Oxlade-Chamberlain | 17 | 9 | 2 | 2 | 4 | 3 | 6 | 3 | 29 | 17 |
| 17 | CM/AM | (England) | Curtis Jones | 15 | 10 | 4 | 3 | 4 | 3 | 4 | 2 | 27 | 18 |
| 18 | LW/AM/SS | (Japan) | Takumi Minamino | 11 | 1 | 4 | 2 | 5 | 4 | 4 | 2 | 24 | 9 |
| 20 | LW/CF/RW | (Portugal) | Diogo Jota | 35 | 27 | 5 | 3 | 4 | 2 | 11 | 7 | 55 | 39 |
| 21 | LB/LWB | (Greece) | Kostas Tsimikas | 13 | 9 | 5 | 3 | 3 | 3 | 5 | 4 | 26 | 19 |
| 23 | LW/AM | (Colombia) | Luis Díaz | 13 | 11 | 5 | 2 | 1 | 1 | 7 | 4 | 26 | 18 |
| 26 | LB/LWB | (Scotland) | Andy Robertson | 29 | 29 | 4 | 3 | 4 | 3 | 10 | 9 | 47 | 44 |
| 27 | CF/LW | (Belgium) | Divock Origi | 7 | 0 | 1 | 1 | 3 | 2 | 7 | 2 | 18 | 5 |
| 32 | CB | (Cameroon) | Joël Matip | 31 | 31 | 1 | 0 | 4 | 4 | 7 | 7 | 43 | 42 |
| 45 | CM | (England) | Elijah Dixon-Bonner | 0 | 0 | 1 | 1 | 1 | 0 | 0 | 0 | 2 | 1 |
| 47 | CB | (England) | Nat Phillips | 0 | 0 | 0 | 0 | 1 | 0 | 2 | 1 | 3 | 1 |
| 49 | AM/RW | (England) | Kaide Gordon | 1 | 0 | 1 | 1 | 2 | 2 | 0 | 0 | 4 | 3 |
| 62 | GK | (Republic of Ireland) | Caoimhín Kelleher | 2 | 2 | 2 | 2 | 4 | 4 | 0 | 0 | 8 | 8 |
| 63 | LB/LWB | (Wales) | Owen Beck | 0 | 0 | 0 | 0 | 2 | 0 | 0 | 0 | 2 | 0 |
| 66 | RB/RWB | (England) | Trent Alexander-Arnold | 32 | 32 | 3 | 3 | 3 | 3 | 9 | 9 | 47 | 47 |
| 67 | AM/CM/RW | (England) | Harvey Elliott | 6 | 4 | 3 | 1 | 1 | 0 | 1 | 1 | 11 | 6 |
| 76 | RB/RWB | (Wales) | Neco Williams | 1 | 0 | 0 | 0 | 4 | 2 | 3 | 2 | 8 | 4 |
| 77 | LB/LWB | (England) | James Norris | 0 | 0 | 1 | 0 | 0 | 0 | 0 | 0 | 1 | 0 |
| 80 | CM/DM | (England) | Tyler Morton | 2 | 1 | 2 | 1 | 3 | 2 | 2 | 2 | 9 | 6 |
| 82 | CF | (England) | Max Woltman | 0 | 0 | 1 | 1 | 0 | 0 | 1 | 0 | 2 | 1 |
| 84 | RB/RWB | (Northern Ireland) | Conor Bradley | 0 | 0 | 1 | 1 | 3 | 2 | 1 | 0 | 5 | 3 |
| 86 | RW/LW | (England) | Harvey Blair | 0 | 0 | 0 | 0 | 1 | 1 | 0 | 0 | 1 | 1 |
| 89 | CB | (France) | Billy Koumetio | 0 | 0 | 0 | 0 | 1 | 1 | 0 | 0 | 1 | 1 |
| 94 | CM | (Germany) | Melkamu Frauendorf | 0 | 0 | 1 | 0 | 0 | 0 | 0 | 0 | 1 | 0 |
| Total | | | | 38 | | 6 | | 6 | | 13 | | 63 | |

=== Goals ===
| Rank | Pos. | No. | Player | Premier League | FA Cup | EFL Cup | Champions League | Total |
|---|---|---|---|---|---|---|---|---|
| 1 | FW | 11 | (Egypt) Mohamed Salah | 23 | 0 | 0 | 8 | 31 |
| 2 | FW | 10 | (Senegal) Sadio Mané | 16 | 2 | 0 | 5 | 23 |
| 3 | FW | 20 | (Portugal) Diogo Jota | 15 | 2 | 3 | 1 | 21 |
| 4 | FW | 9 | (Brazil) Roberto Firmino | 5 | 1 | 0 | 5 | 11 |
| 5 | FW | 18 | (Japan) Takumi Minamino | 3 | 3 | 4 | 0 | 10 |
| 6 | MF | 3 | (Brazil) Fabinho | 5 | 2 | 0 | 1 | 8 |
| 7 | FW | 23 | (Colombia) Luis Díaz | 4 | 0 | 0 | 2 | 6 |
| 7 | FW | 27 | (Belgium) Divock Origi | 3 | 0 | 2 | 1 | 6 |
| 9 | MF | 8 | (Guinea) Naby Keïta | 3 | 0 | 0 | 1 | 4 |
| 10 | DF | 4 | (Netherlands) Virgil van Dijk | 3 | 0 | 0 | 0 | 3 |
| 10 | DF | 5 | (France) Ibrahima Konaté | 0 | 1 | 0 | 2 | 3 |
| 10 | MF | 14 | (England) Jordan Henderson | 2 | 0 | 0 | 1 | 3 |
| 10 | MF | 15 | (England) Alex Oxlade-Chamberlain | 2 | 0 | 1 | 0 | 3 |
| 10 | DF | 26 | (Scotland) Andy Robertson | 3 | 0 | 0 | 0 | 3 |
| 10 | DF | 32 | (Cameroon) Joël Matip | 3 | 0 | 0 | 0 | 3 |
| 16 | MF | 6 | (Spain) Thiago | 1 | 0 | 0 | 1 | 2 |
| 16 | DF | 66 | (England) Trent Alexander-Arnold | 2 | 0 | 0 | 0 | 2 |
| 18 | MF | 17 | (England) Curtis Jones | 1 | 0 | 0 | 0 | 1 |
| 18 | FW | 49 | (England) Kaide Gordon | 0 | 1 | 0 | 0 | 1 |
| 18 | FW | 67 | (England) Harvey Elliott | 0 | 1 | 0 | 0 | 1 |
| Own goals | | | | 0 | 0 | 0 | 2 | 2 |
| Total | | | | 94 | 13 | 10 | 30 | 147 |

=== Clean sheets ===
| No. | Player | Premier League | FA Cup | EFL Cup | Champions League | Total |
|---|---|---|---|---|---|---|
| 1 | (Brazil) Alisson Becker | 20 | 2 | 1 | 4 | 27 |
| 62 | (Republic of Ireland) Caoimhín Kelleher | 1 | 0 | 3 | 0 | 4 |
| 13 | (Spain) Adrián | 0 | 0 | 1 | 0 | 1 |
| Total | | 21 | 2 | 5 | 4 | 32 |

=== Disciplinary record ===
| No. | Pos. | Player | Premier League | | | FA Cup | | | EFL Cup | | | Champions League | | | Total | | |
| No. | Pos. | Player | Yellow card | (yellow card) (yellow-red card) | Red card | Yellow card | (yellow card) (yellow-red card) | Red card | Yellow card | (yellow card) (yellow-red card) | Red card | Yellow card | (yellow card) (yellow-red card) | Red card | Yellow card | (yellow card) (yellow-red card) | Red card |
|---|---|---|---|---|---|---|---|---|---|---|---|---|---|---|---|---|---|
| 3 | MF | (Brazil) Fabinho | 7 | 0 | 0 | 1 | 0 | 0 | 0 | 0 | 0 | 1 | 0 | 0 | 9 | 0 | 0 |
| 4 | DF | (Netherlands) Virgil van Dijk | 3 | 0 | 0 | 0 | 0 | 0 | 0 | 0 | 0 | 1 | 0 | 0 | 4 | 0 | 0 |
| 5 | DF | (France) Ibrahima Konaté | 2 | 0 | 0 | 0 | 0 | 0 | 2 | 0 | 0 | 1 | 0 | 0 | 5 | 0 | 0 |
| 6 | MF | (Spain) Thiago | 2 | 0 | 0 | 0 | 0 | 0 | 0 | 0 | 0 | 1 | 0 | 0 | 3 | 0 | 0 |
| 7 | MF | (England) James Milner | 2 | 0 | 0 | 0 | 0 | 0 | 0 | 0 | 0 | 3 | 0 | 0 | 5 | 0 | 0 |
| 8 | MF | (Guinea) Naby Keïta | 3 | 0 | 0 | 1 | 0 | 0 | 0 | 0 | 0 | 0 | 0 | 0 | 4 | 0 | 0 |
| 9 | FW | (Brazil) Roberto Firmino | 2 | 0 | 0 | 0 | 0 | 0 | 0 | 0 | 0 | 0 | 0 | 0 | 2 | 0 | 0 |
| 10 | FW | (Senegal) Sadio Mané | 5 | 0 | 0 | 1 | 0 | 0 | 0 | 0 | 0 | 2 | 0 | 0 | 8 | 0 | 0 |
| 11 | FW | (Egypt) Mohamed Salah | 1 | 0 | 0 | 0 | 0 | 0 | 0 | 0 | 0 | 0 | 0 | 0 | 1 | 0 | 0 |
| 12 | DF | (England) Joe Gomez | 2 | 0 | 0 | 1 | 0 | 0 | 0 | 0 | 0 | 0 | 0 | 0 | 3 | 0 | 0 |
| 14 | MF | (England) Jordan Henderson | 3 | 0 | 0 | 1 | 0 | 0 | 0 | 0 | 0 | 0 | 0 | 0 | 4 | 0 | 0 |
| 17 | MF | (England) Curtis Jones | 0 | 0 | 0 | 0 | 0 | 0 | 2 | 0 | 0 | 0 | 0 | 0 | 2 | 0 | 0 |
| 18 | FW | (Japan) Takumi Minamino | 1 | 0 | 0 | 0 | 0 | 0 | 2 | 0 | 0 | 0 | 0 | 0 | 3 | 0 | 0 |
| 20 | FW | (Portugal) Diogo Jota | 3 | 0 | 0 | 1 | 0 | 0 | 0 | 0 | 0 | 2 | 0 | 0 | 6 | 0 | 0 |
| 21 | DF | (Greece) Kostas Tsimikas | 3 | 0 | 0 | 0 | 0 | 0 | 0 | 0 | 0 | 0 | 0 | 0 | 3 | 0 | 0 |
| 26 | DF | (Scotland) Andy Robertson | 5 | 0 | 1 | 0 | 0 | 0 | 1 | 0 | 0 | 1 | 0 | 0 | 7 | 0 | 1 |
| 32 | DF | (Cameroon) Joël Matip | 2 | 0 | 0 | 0 | 0 | 0 | 0 | 0 | 0 | 2 | 0 | 0 | 2 | 0 | 0 |
| 66 | DF | (England) Trent Alexander-Arnold | 2 | 0 | 0 | 0 | 0 | 0 | 1 | 0 | 0 | 2 | 0 | 0 | 5 | 0 | 0 |
| 80 | MF | (England) Tyler Morton | 1 | 0 | 0 | 0 | 0 | 0 | 1 | 0 | 0 | 0 | 0 | 0 | 2 | 0 | 0 |
| 62 | GK | (Republic of Ireland) Caoimhin Kelleher | 0 | 0 | 0 | 1 | 0 | 0 | 0 | 0 | 0 | 0 | 0 | 0 | 1 | 0 | 0 |
| Total | | | 44 | 0 | 1 | 6 | 0 | 0 | 5 | 0 | 0 | 18 | 0 | 0 | 73 | 0 | 1 |

== Club awards ==
=== End-of-season awards ===
- Standard Chartered Men's Player of the Season: Mohamed Salah
- Goal of the Season: Mohamed Salah (vs. Man City, 3 October 2021)

=== Player of the Month award ===
Awarded monthly to the player that was chosen by fans voting on Liverpoolfc.com

| Month | Player | Ref. |
|---|---|---|
| August | (Egypt) Mohamed Salah | |
| September | (Egypt) Mohamed Salah | |
| October | (Egypt) Mohamed Salah | |
| November | (England) Trent Alexander-Arnold | |
| December | (Egypt) Mohamed Salah | |
| January | (Brazil) Fabinho | |
| February | (Netherlands) Virgil van Dijk | |
| March | (Brazil) Alisson Becker | |
| April | (Spain) Thiago | |

== See also ==
- 2021–22 in English football
- List of Liverpool F.C. seasons
