= Caoimhín Kelleher =

Irish footballer (born 1998)

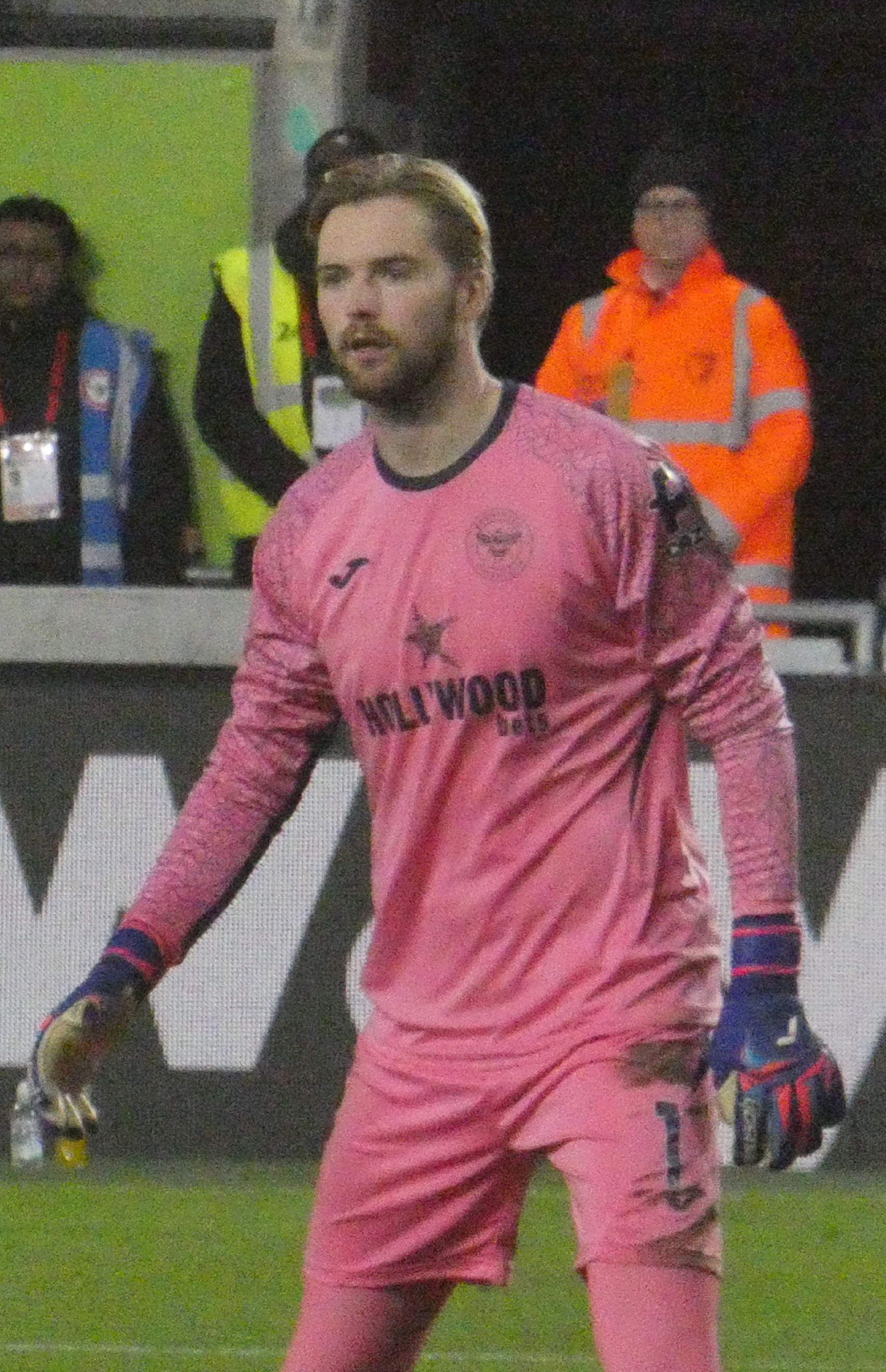
- Kelleher playing for Brentford in 2025

Personal information
- Full name: Caoimhín Odhrán Kelleher
- Date of birth: 23 November 1998 (age 27)
- Place of birth: Cork, Ireland
- Height: 1.88 m (6 ft 2 in)
- Position: Goalkeeper

Team information
- Current team: Brentford
- Number: 1

Youth career
- Rockmount
- –2015: Ringmahon Rangers
- 2015–2019: Liverpool

Senior career*
| Years | Team | Apps | (Gls) |
| 2019–2025 | Liverpool | 25 | (0) |
| 2025– | Brentford | 47 | (0) |

International career^{‡}
| 2014–2015 | Republic of Ireland U17 | 1 | (0) |
| 2016–2017 | Republic of Ireland U19 | 8 | (0) |
| 2019 | Republic of Ireland U21 | 10 | (0) |
| 2021– | Republic of Ireland | 38 | (0) |
- * Club domestic league appearances and goals as of 16:18, 8 November 2026 (UTC) ‡ National team caps and goals as of 21:39, 17 November 2026 (UTC)

Caoimhín Odhrán Kelleher (Irish: [ˈkiːvʲiːnʲ ˈoːɾˠaːnˠ ˈkɛlɪhəɹ] KEE-veen OR-ən KELL-e-her; born 23 November 1998) is an Irish professional footballer who plays as a goalkeeper for Premier League club Brentford and the Republic of Ireland national team.

Kelleher is a graduate of Liverpool's youth academy and made his senior competitive debut for the club in September 2019. He then emerged as the back-up goalkeeper to Alisson Becker, gaining a reputation as a talented shot-stopper and penalty specialist. During his time at Liverpool, he won the Premier League, the FA Cup, the UEFA Champions League and the resultant UEFA Super Cup. He also won the EFL Cup twice; in the 2021–22 and 2023–24 seasons. In 2025, Kelleher signed for Brentford in a transfer reportedly worth £12.5 million.

Kelleher made his senior Ireland debut in June 2021 and has since represented his nation in the UEFA Nations League.

== Early life ==
Caoimhín Odhrán Kelleher was born on 23 November 1998 in Cork, County Cork, where he attended Presentation Brothers College.

== Club career ==
=== Liverpool ===
Kelleher began his career with Rockmount before joining Ringmahon Rangers. He joined Liverpool's academy in summer 2015. He featured regularly for Liverpool's side during their pre-season programme of 2018 and was part of the squad that travelled to the United States for Liverpool's summer tour.

In August 2018, he signed a new contract with Liverpool. He was an unused substitute for the 2019 UEFA Champions League final against Tottenham Hotspur. In winning the Champions League, he became the 12th Irish footballer to do so and the first for over a decade.

Though he was recovering from wrist surgery, Kelleher was on the bench for Liverpool's victory in the 2019 UEFA Super Cup against Chelsea in Istanbul due to the absence of first-choice Alisson. He made his competitive debut for the club on 25 September 2019 in an EFL Cup third round match, keeping a clean sheet against League One side Milton Keynes Dons, in a 2–0 away win.

On 1 December 2020, Kelleher started and kept a clean sheet in a 1–0 victory against Ajax in the Champions League. Five days later, Kelleher was named in the starting line-up for a Premier League match against Wolverhampton Wanderers. He kept a clean sheet in the match, a 4–0 win, which was his third consecutive shutout for the club. At 22 years and 13 days, Kelleher became the third-youngest Liverpool goalkeeper to keep a Premier League clean sheet and the youngest to do so on his first league start. After several strong performances, manager Jürgen Klopp confirmed that Kelleher had been promoted to second choice, behind Alisson and ahead of Adrián. It was also reported that Liverpool were seeking to sign Kelleher to a new long-term contract on improved terms.

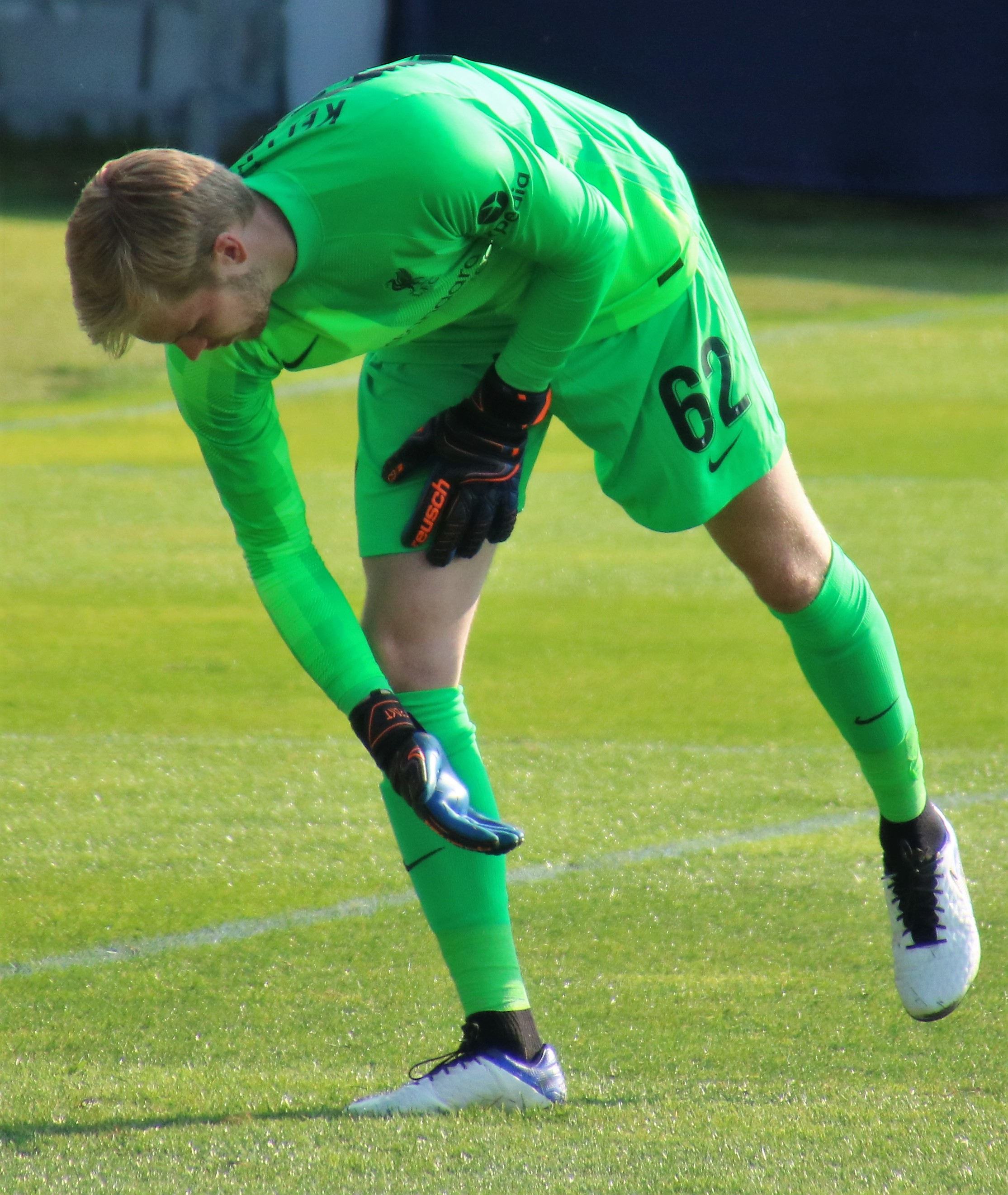
Kelleher playing for Liverpool in 2021

Kelleher signed a new long-term deal with Liverpool on 24 June 2021, to last until 2026. He said "For me, it was a positive moment to commit my future to the club for the next few years. It's such a big club and it's an honour to be a part of it, so when I got the chance to sign for a few more years I was obviously delighted."

On 27 February 2022, Kelleher started in the 2022 EFL Cup final and scored the decisive penalty in the 11–10 penalty shoot-out win against Chelsea.

Kelleher made his first start of the 2022–23 season on 9 November 2022 and saved three penalties in a 3–2 penalty shoot-out win against Derby County in the third round of the 2022–23 EFL Cup at Anfield. With the result, he saved a total of six penalties in four shootouts for Liverpool, breaking Pepe Reina's record of five saves. Four of his eight appearances in the EFL Cup had gone to penalties, with Liverpool winning all of them.

On 1 June 2023, Republic of Ireland national team boss Stephen Kenny said he expected Kelleher to leave Liverpool because he had been given so few opportunities to play. "He has been starved of games this year and that has been a problem for him", Kenny said. On 27 September, Kelleher played in the 3–1 win against Leicester City in the 2023–24 EFL Cup and wore the captain's armband for the last 12 minutes of the game when stand-in captain Curtis Jones was substituted. Kelleher started in the 2024 EFL Cup final at Wembley, in which a Virgil van Dijk header in the 118th minute secured the trophy against Chelsea and Kelleher kept a clean sheet with several reflex saves throughout the match.

Following an injury to Alisson in October 2024, Kelleher played several matches including a home tie with Real Madrid in the Champions League. He saved a penalty in the match from Kylian Mbappé to maintain Liverpool's lead in a 2–0 win. The penalty save, coupled with another penalty save earlier against Southampton in the Premier League, was the first time a goalkeeper made two consecutive penalty saves for Liverpool.

During his time at Liverpool, Kelleher kept 24 clean sheets in 67 appearances, and achieved the record for the most penalty shootout saves (6) and penalty shootout wins (4) in the club's history.

=== Brentford ===
On 3 June 2025, Kelleher joined fellow Premier League side Brentford, signing a five-year contract with the club with the option of a twelve-month extension. Although the official fee was undisclosed, it was reported to be £12.5 million, with add-ons which could take the fee to £18 million. He made his debut for the club on 17 August, in a 3–1 league defeat to Nottingham Forest. On 23 August, he kept his first clean sheet for Brentford in a 1–0 victory against Aston Villa.

== International career ==
Kelleher featured for the Republic of Ireland U17s in the 2015 UEFA European Under-17 Championship. He was capped by his country at under-17 level in 2014, making his debut against Malta. He has also been capped at under-19 and under-21 level.

Kelleher was named in the senior Republic of Ireland squad for the first time on 6 November 2018, for the friendly match against Northern Ireland and the UEFA Nations League match against Denmark later in the month. On 8 June 2021, Kelleher made his senior Ireland debut, coming on as a half-time substitute against Hungary in a 0–0 draw.

On 14 November 2024, Kelleher saved Joel Pohjanpalo's penalty in the 77th minute in Ireland's Nations League qualifying game against Finland which led them to a third-place playoff spot in the competition.

== Personal life ==
Kelleher's older brother Fiacre is also a footballer. He has three other older brothers who played hurling. On 21 June 2025, he announced his engagement to his girlfriend Eimear Murphy. The couple's first child was born on 28 February 2026.

== Career statistics ==
=== Club ===
As of match played 8 November 2026

Appearances and goals by club, season and competition
| Club | Season | League | | | FA Cup | | EFL Cup | | Continental | | Other | | Total | |
| Club | Season | Division | Apps | Goals | Apps | Goals | Apps | Goals | Apps | Goals | Apps | Goals | Apps | Goals |
|---|---|---|---|---|---|---|---|---|---|---|---|---|---|---|
| Liverpool | 2019–20 | Premier League | 0 | 0 | 1 | 0 | 3 | 0 | 0 | 0 | 0 | 0 | 4 | 0 |
| Liverpool | 2020–21 | Premier League | 2 | 0 | 1 | 0 | 0 | 0 | 2 (Note: Appearances in UEFA Champions League) | 0 | 0 | 0 | 5 | 0 |
| Liverpool | 2021–22 | Premier League | 2 | 0 | 2 | 0 | 4 | 0 | 0 | 0 | — | | 8 | 0 |
| Liverpool | 2022–23 | Premier League | 1 | 0 | 1 | 0 | 2 | 0 | 0 | 0 | 0 | 0 | 4 | 0 |
| Liverpool | 2023–24 | Premier League | 10 | 0 | 2 | 0 | 6 | 0 | 8 (Note: Appearances in UEFA Europa League) | 0 | — | | 26 | 0 |
| Liverpool | 2024–25 | Premier League | 10 | 0 | 2 | 0 | 4 | 0 | 4 | 0 | — | | 20 | 0 |
| Liverpool | Total | | 25 | 0 | 9 | 0 | 19 | 0 | 14 | 0 | 0 | 0 | 67 | 0 |
| Brentford | 2025–26 | Premier League | 37 | 0 | 1 | 0 | 0 | 0 | — | | — | | 38 | 0 |
| Brentford | 2026–27 | Premier League | 10 | 0 | 0 | 0 | 0 | 0 | — | | — | | 10 | 0 |
| Brentford | Total | | 47 | 0 | 1 | 0 | 0 | 0 | — | | — | | 48 | 0 |
| Career total | | | 72 | 0 | 10 | 0 | 19 | 0 | 14 | 0 | 0 | 0 | 112 | 0 |

=== International ===
As of match played 17 November 2026

Appearances and goals by national team and year
| National team | Year | Apps | Goals |
|---|---|---|---|
| Republic of Ireland | 2021 | 2 | 0 |
| Republic of Ireland | 2022 | 7 | 0 |
| Republic of Ireland | 2023 | 2 | 0 |
| Republic of Ireland | 2024 | 9 | 0 |
| Republic of Ireland | 2025 | 9 | 0 |
| Republic of Ireland | 2026 | 9 | 0 |
| Total | | 38 | 0 |

== Honours ==
Liverpool

- Premier League: 2024–25
- FA Cup: 2021–22
- EFL Cup: 2021–22, 2023–24; runner-up: 2024–25
- UEFA Champions League: 2018–19; runner-up: 2021–22
- UEFA Super Cup: 2019
