= Kostas Tsimikas =

Greek footballer (born 1996)

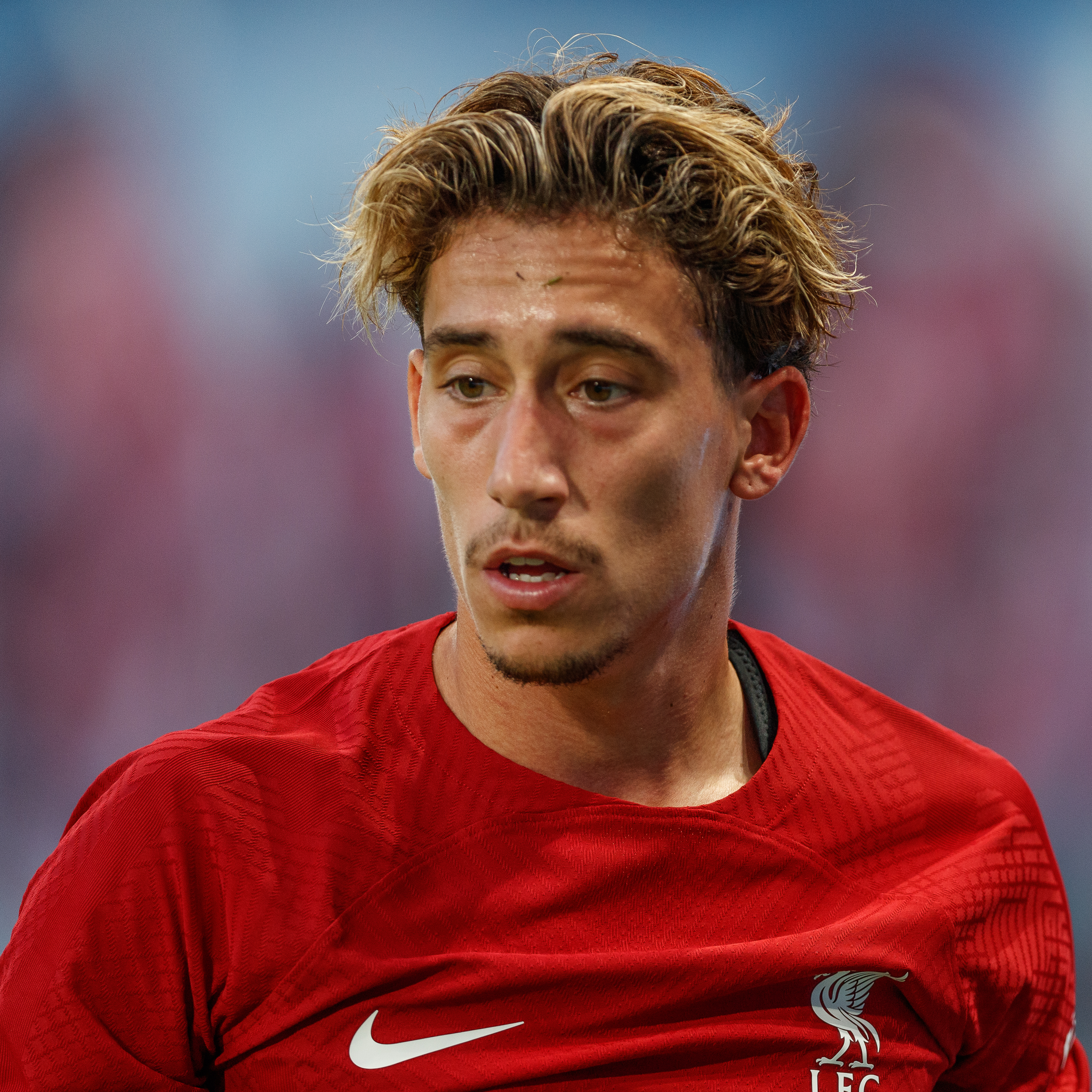
- Tsimikas playing for Liverpool in 2022

Personal information
- Full name: Konstantinos Tsimikas
- Date of birth: 12 May 1996 (age 30)
- Place of birth: Thessaloniki, Greece
- Height: 1.79 m (5 ft 10 in)
- Position: Left-back

Team information
- Current team: Liverpool
- Number: 21

Youth career
- 2010–2013: Neapoli Thessalonikis
- 2013–2014: Panserraikos
- 2014–2015: Olympiacos

Senior career*
Years	Team	Apps	(Gls)
2015–2020	Olympiacos	46	(0)
2017	→ Esbjerg (loan)	9	(2)
2017–2018	→ Willem II (loan)	33	(3)
2020–	Liverpool	70	(0)
2025–2026	→ Roma (loan)	18	(0)

International career^{‡}
2014–2015	Greece U19	13	(0)
2016–2018	Greece U21	17	(2)
2018–	Greece	57	(2)
- * Club domestic league appearances and goals as of 1 November 2026 ‡ National team caps and goals as of 16 November 2026

Konstantinos "Kostas" Tsimikas (Greek: Κωνσταντίνος Τσιμίκας; born 12 May 1996) is a Greek professional footballer who plays as a left-back for Premier League club Liverpool and the Greece national team.

Tsimikas began his professional career at Olympiacos, winning two Super League Greece titles while also having loan spells with Esbjerg and Willem II. He joined Liverpool in 2020, helping the team to successes in the Premier League, FA Cup and EFL Cup. Tsimikas made his senior international debut for Greece in 2018.

== Club career ==
=== Early life and career ===
Tsimikas was born in Thessaloniki, and hails from the village of Lefkonas, Serres. He started his career from his village's local team and he transferred to Neapoli Thessaloniki when he was 14 years old. In 2013, he moved to Panserraikos and he scored 5 goals during 2013–14 season in Gamma Ethniki.

=== Olympiacos ===
Tsimikas made his Olympiacos debut in the Super League in a match against AEL Kalloni on 19 December 2015.

==== Loan to Esbjerg ====
On 28 December 2016, Tsimikas signed for Danish club Esbjerg on a loan until the end of the 2016–17 season. On 17 February 2017, in his debut with the club, he scored a goal in a 3–0 home win game against Sønderjyske. He left the club after 13 games and returned to Olympiacos.

==== Loan to Willem II ====
On 30 June 2017, Tsimikas made another loan move, this time to Dutch club Willem II on a season-long contract. He was a regular in the 2017–18 Eredivisie, starting 32 of the 34 matches, and also scored five goals. In the quarter-finals of the KNVB Cup, his deflected free kick took the tie into extra time, and Willem II went on to beat Roda on penalties. Tsimikas' spectacular scorpion kick in a 3–2 win against Utrecht was voted Voetbal International's Goal of the Month and contributed to him being named Eredivisie Rookie of the Month for March 2018.

==== Return to Olympiacos ====
Coach Pedro Martins kept Tsimikas at Olympiacos for the 2018–19 season. In November 2018, he crossed for Kostas Fortounis' first goal in a 5–1 defeat of Dudelange in the Europa League group stage; both players were named in the UEFA Europa League Team of the Week. In late 2018, Tsimikas did not start many games, though was still offered a new deal, keeping him at the club until the summer of 2023.

=== Liverpool ===
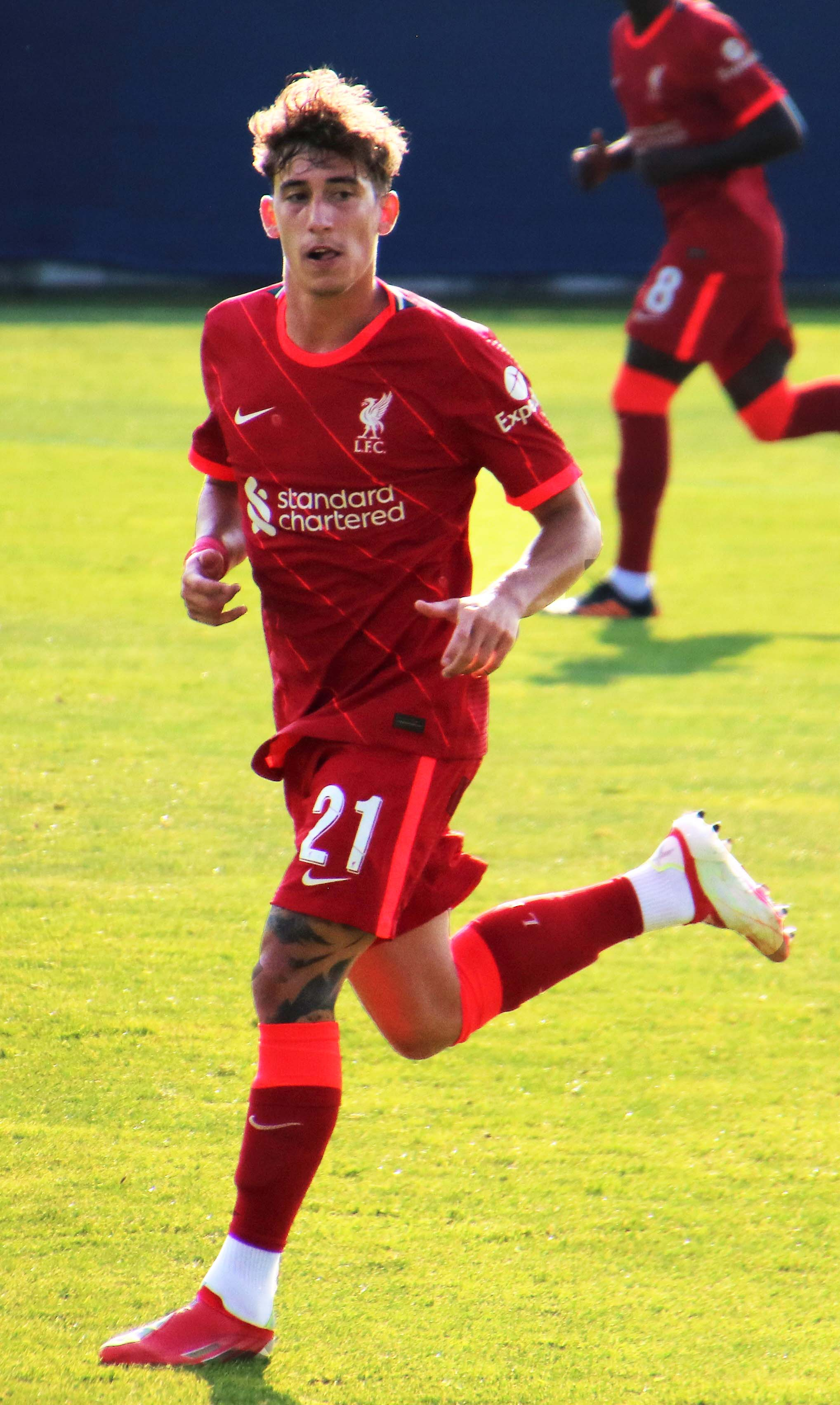
Tsimikas playing for Liverpool in 2021

On 11 August 2020, Tsimikas signed for Premier League side Liverpool on a deal for a reported fee of £11.75 million. He became only the second Greek player in Liverpool's history, after Sotirios Kyrgiakos who joined the club from AEK Athens in 2009. He made his debut for Liverpool in the EFL Cup on 24 September 2020, in a 7–2 win against Lincoln City. He made his Premier League debut as a substitute for Andrew Robertson against Manchester City in a 4–1 loss.

On 14 August 2021, he made his first league start in a 3–0 away win against Norwich City on the opening weekend of the season. He followed this up with a man-of-the-match performance on 21 August, providing the assist for Diogo Jota's goal in a 2–0 win over Burnley.

On 13 April 2022, at the quarter-finals of the 2021–22 UEFA Champions League against Benfica, Tsimikas provided two assists in a 3–3 draw, helping Liverpool to secure their place in the semi-finals. He was named player of the match.

On 14 May 2022, Liverpool faced Chelsea in the FA Cup final at Wembley. With the game having finished 0–0 after 90 minutes, Tsimikas came off the bench in the 111th minute to replace the injured Robertson. Liverpool then won the penalty shoot-out 6–5, with Tsimikas scoring the deciding penalty. He said afterwards, "The boss asked me which number (penalty) I want, and I said number seven. He asked 'why so far?'. I said 'I just want number seven' and it gave me the opportunity to win the game. I chose the right side and scored."

On 25 September 2023, Tsimikas signed a new long-term deal reportedly keeping him at the club until 2027. On 23 December 2023, he suffered a broken collarbone following a physical challenge with Bukayo Saka in a 1–1 league draw against Arsenal. Tsimikas played in the 2024 EFL Cup final against Chelsea, assisting Virgil van Dijk's winning goal from a corner kick as Liverpool triumphed 1–0.

On 27 April 2025, Tsimikas became the first Greek footballer to win the Premier League, following Liverpool's 5–1 victory over Tottenham Hotspur at Anfield.

==== Loan to Roma ====
On 31 August 2025, Tsimikas joined Serie A club Roma on a season-long loan until the end of the 2025–26 season. However, he wouldn't make his Roma debut until 25 September 2025 in an away game to Nice in the Europa League. He played the full 90 minutes as Roma won 1–2.

== International career ==
Tsimikas received his first call-up to the Greece senior team for the 2018–19 UEFA Nations League matches against Hungary and Finland in October 2018. He made his international debut in the starting eleven for the match at home to Hungary on 12 October, and crossed for Kostas Mitroglou to score the only goal of the game.

On 9 October 2025, Tsimikas scored his first goal for Greece in a 3–1 defeat against Scotland, in the 2026 FIFA World Cup Qualifiers.

== Career statistics ==
=== Club ===
As of match played 4 November 2026

Appearances and goals by club, season and competition
Club	Season	League			National cup (Note: Includes Greek Cup, Danish Cup, KNVB Cup, FA Cup)		League cup (Note: Includes EFL Cup)		Europe		Other		Total	
Club	Season	Division	Apps	Goals	Apps	Goals	Apps	Goals	Apps	Goals	Apps	Goals	Apps	Goals
Olympiacos	2015–16	Super League Greece	3	0	6	0	—		0	0	—		9	0
Olympiacos	2016–17	Super League Greece	1	0	2	0	—		0	0	—		3	0
Olympiacos	2018–19	Super League Greece	15	0	4	0	—		9 (Note: Appearances in UEFA Europa League)	0	—		28	0
Olympiacos	2019–20	Super League Greece	27	0	3	0	—		16 (Note: Twelve appearances in UEFA Champions League, four appearances in UEFA Europa League)	0	—		46	0
Olympiacos	Total		46	0	15	0	—		25	0	—		86	0
Esbjerg (loan)	2016–17	Danish Superliga	9	2	4	0	—		—		—		13	2
Willem II (loan)	2017–18	Eredivisie	33	3	4	3	—		—		—		37	6
Liverpool	2020–21	Premier League	2	0	0	0	1	0	4 (Note: Appearances in UEFA Champions League)	0	0	0	7	0
Liverpool	2021–22	Premier League	13	0	5	0	3	0	5	0	—		26	0
Liverpool	2022–23	Premier League	20	0	1	0	1	0	6	0	0	0	28	0
Liverpool	2023–24	Premier League	13	0	2	0	4	0	6	0	—		25	0
Liverpool	2024–25	Premier League	18	0	2	0	3	0	6	0	—		29	0
Liverpool	2026–27	Premier League	4	0	0	0	1	0	4	0	—		9	0
Liverpool	Total		70	0	10	0	13	0	31	0	0	0	124	0
Roma (loan)	2025–26	Serie A	18	0	0	0	—		7	0	—		25	0
Career total			176	5	33	3	13	0	63	0	0	0	285	8

=== International ===
As of match played 16 November 2026

Appearances and goals by national team and year
National team	Year	Apps	Goals
Greece	2018	2	0
Greece	2019	1	0
Greece	2020	3	0
Greece	2021	10	0
Greece	2022	8	0
Greece	2023	8	0
Greece	2024	7	0
Greece	2025	8	1
Greece	2026	10	1
Total		57	2

Scores and results list Greece's goal tally first, score column indicates score after each Tsimikas goal.

List of international goals scored by Kostas Tsimikas
No.	Date	Venue	Opponent	Score	Result	Competition
1	9 October 2025	Hampden Park, Glasgow, Scotland	Scotland	1–0	1–3	2026 FIFA World Cup qualification
2	4 June 2026	Nationalarenan, Solna, Sweden	Sweden	1–0	2–2	Friendly

== Honours ==
Olympiacos

- Super League Greece: 2015–16, 2016–17, 2019–20
- Greek Football Cup: 2019–20

Liverpool

- Premier League: 2024–25
- FA Cup: 2021–22
- EFL Cup: 2021–22, 2023–24; runner-up: 2024–25
- UEFA Champions League runner-up: 2021–22

Individual

- Eredivisie Talent of the Month: March 2018
- Super League Greece Greek Footballer of the Season: 2019–20
- Super League Greece Team of the Season: 2019–20
- Gazzetta Awards – Greek Footballer of the Year: 2021, 2022
