= 2022 EFL Cup final =

Final of the 2021–22 EFL Cup

- Match programme cover
- Event: 2021–22 EFL Cup
Chelsea	Liverpool
0	0
- After extra time Liverpool won 11–10 on penalties
- Date: 27 February 2022
- Venue: Wembley Stadium, London
- Man of the Match: Virgil van Dijk (Liverpool)
- Referee: Stuart Attwell (Warwickshire)
- Attendance: 85,512

The 2022 EFL Cup final was the final of the 2021–22 EFL Cup. It was played between Chelsea and Liverpool at Wembley Stadium in London, England, on 27 February 2022. The match saw no goals in the initial 90 minutes or the additional 30 minutes of extra time and went to a penalty shoot-out; each of the first 21 kicks in the shoot-out was scored before Chelsea goalkeeper Kepa Arrizabalaga missed his to give Liverpool an 11–10 victory and a record ninth EFL Cup title.

It was the first EFL Cup final since 2017 not to feature Manchester City, who had been knocked out in the fourth round by West Ham United.

== Route to the final ==
=== Chelsea ===
Round	Opposition	Score
3	Aston Villa (H)	1–1 (4–3 p.)
4	Southampton (H)	1–1 (4–3 p.)
QF	Brentford (A)	2–0
SF	Tottenham Hotspur (H)	2–0
SF	Tottenham Hotspur (A)	1–0
Key: (H) = Home; (A) = Away

Chelsea, as a Premier League team involved in the 2021–22 UEFA Champions League, started in the Third Round. Their first match was at home to fellow Premier League side Aston Villa. Timo Werner put Chelsea ahead in the second half, only for Cameron Archer to equalise for Villa. The match went to a penalty shoot-out, which Chelsea won 4–3. In the next round, they were again given a home draw against a Premier League side, this time Southampton. Chelsea again took the lead through Kai Havertz just before half-time, but Ché Adams equalised just after the interval to again take the tie to a penalty shoot-out, which Chelsea again won 4–3. In the quarter-finals, Chelsea received their first away draw, coming up against West London rivals and fellow Premier League side Brentford. The match went goalless until 10 minutes from the end, when Brentford's Pontus Jansson scored an own goal, before Jorginho sealed a 2–0 win for Chelsea with a penalty. In the two-legged semi-final, Chelsea drew yet another Premier League side in London rivals Tottenham Hotspur. In the first leg at Stamford Bridge, Chelsea won 2–0; both goals came in the first half, first from Havertz before Tottenham's Ben Davies scored an own goal. In the return leg at Tottenham Hotspur Stadium, a 1–0 win thanks to a goal from Antonio Rüdiger was enough to put Chelsea through to the final 3–0 on aggregate.

=== Liverpool ===
Round	Opposition	Score
3	Norwich City (A)	3–0
4	Preston North End (A)	2–0
QF	Leicester City (H)	3–3 (5–4 p.)
SF	Arsenal (H)	0–0
SF	Arsenal (A)	2–0
Key: (H) = Home; (A) = Away

As another Premier League team involved in the 2021–22 UEFA Champions League, Liverpool also started in the Third Round. Their first game of the competition was away to fellow Premier League club Norwich City, which they won 3–0; Takumi Minamino opened the scoring in the first five minutes, and Divock Origi also scored early in the second half before Minamino scored his second goal with 10 minutes left to play. Liverpool received another away draw in the Fourth Round, where they defeated EFL Championship side Preston North End 2–0, thanks again to goals from Minamino and Origi. Liverpool were 3–1 down at half-time in their Fifth Round match at home to Leicester City, with two goals from Jamie Vardy and one from James Maddison either side of one from Alex Oxlade-Chamberlain; Diogo Jota pulled a goal back midway through the second half, before Minamino scored his fourth goal of the competition in the fifth minute of injury time to take the game to penalties. After Caoimhín Kelleher saved Luke Thomas' kick, Minamino had the chance to win it for Liverpool, only to shoot over; however, Ryan Bertrand missed with Leicester's next attempt, allowing Jota to give Liverpool a 5–4 shoot-out win. They were drawn against Arsenal in the semi-finals, but an outbreak of COVID-19 in the Liverpool squad meant the first leg had to be postponed after the team's training facility was shut. In what was originally meant to be the second leg at Anfield, Liverpool failed to score despite having a man advantage for almost three quarters of the game after Granit Xhaka was sent off, and the game finished 0–0. In the delayed second leg, Diogo Jota scored both goals at the Emirates Stadium to send Liverpool to the final.

== Pre-match ==
This was Chelsea's ninth League Cup final and Liverpool's thirteenth – the latter is the most appearances of any club in this competition. It also meant that Chelsea's manager Thomas Tuchel had led them to the finals of the UEFA Champions League, FA Cup and EFL Cup within a year of being appointed.

This was the sides' second meeting in a League Cup final, having met in 2005, when then-Chelsea manager José Mourinho guided the club to its first trophy since the 2000 FA Charity Shield. They also met in three more title-deciding matches, the 2006 FA Community Shield, the 2012 FA Cup final, and the 2019 UEFA Super Cup; Chelsea won in 2012, and Liverpool won the other two meetings.

== Match ==
=== Team selection ===
Following Liverpool's semi-final second leg victory over Arsenal, manager Jürgen Klopp confirmed that goalkeeper Caoimhín Kelleher would play in the final; Kelleher had only missed one EFL Cup match during the season – the fourth-round win over Preston. In a much-publicised move, Chelsea started the game with Kai Havertz in the central attacking position rather than Romelu Lukaku. Liverpool were forced into a late change as an injury to Thiago Alcântara in the warm-up meant Naby Keïta came into their starting lineup and Harvey Elliott came into the substitutes.

=== Summary ===
Chelsea started the game stronger, creating the first clear chance of the game in the sixth minute, when Liverpool goalkeeper Caoimhín Kelleher parried a shot by Christian Pulisic. Gradually Liverpool grew into the game, with increasing intensity, culminating in a double save from Chelsea goalkeeper Édouard Mendy after efforts from Naby Keïta and Sadio Mané. Luis Díaz, lively on the left wing, was the standout player for Liverpool, with much of their play focused on that side of the pitch. Towards the end of the first half, Mason Mount had a clear chance but spurned it wide. The first half concluded with Liverpool enjoying most of the possession, but with Chelsea having the better chances. Chelsea created five chances in the first half with Havertz contributing four and César Azpilicueta one. The German would go on to end the game with five chances created, the most in an EFL Cup final since David Silva. However, Liverpool full-back Trent Alexander-Arnold exceeded that number with six chances created.

Four minutes into the second half, Mount was presented with yet another good opportunity, only for him to hit the post after Kelleher seemed beaten. In the 69th minute, Liverpool thought they had taken the lead via a Joël Matip header, but the goal was ruled out after the video assistant referee (VAR) intervened, judging that Virgil van Dijk, from an offside position, had fouled Reece James in the build-up. Both Liverpool and Chelsea continued to create chances, but neither side was able to score during regulation time.

In extra-time, Chelsea had goals from Romelu Lukaku and Kai Havertz ruled out for offside. Chelsea goalkeeper Kepa Arrizabalaga was brought on for Mendy for the penalty shoot-out. Both teams scored their initial five spot kicks, and the shoot-out went to sudden death. All ten outfield players from both sides converted their penalties to make it 10–10. Liverpool's goalkeeper Kelleher then scored his team's eleventh penalty. With Liverpool leading 11–10, Arrizabalaga stepped up to take Chelsea's eleventh, but he shot over the crossbar, meaning Liverpool had achieved a record ninth EFL Cup win, their first in a decade, and Jürgen Klopp's first domestic cup as Liverpool manager.

=== Details ===
27 February 2022
16:30 GMT

Chelsea	0–0 (a.e.t.)	Liverpool
	Report
Penalties
Alonso (penalty scored); Lukaku (penalty scored); Havertz (penalty scored); James (penalty scored); Jorginho (penalty scored); Rüdiger (penalty scored); Kanté (penalty scored); Werner (penalty scored); Silva (penalty scored); Chalobah (penalty scored); Arrizabalaga (penalty missed)	10–11	(penalty scored) Milner; (penalty scored) Fabinho; (penalty scored) Van Dijk; (penalty scored) Alexander-Arnold; (penalty scored) Salah; (penalty scored) Jota; (penalty scored) Origi; (penalty scored) Robertson; (penalty scored) Elliott; (penalty scored) Konaté; (penalty scored) Kelleher

Wembley Stadium, London
Attendance: 85,512
Referee: Stuart Attwell (Warwickshire)

Chelsea	Liverpool

GK	16	(Senegal) Édouard Mendy		(substituted off) 120'
CB	14	(England) Trevoh Chalobah
CB	6	(Brazil) Thiago Silva
CB	2	(Germany) Antonio Rüdiger
RM	28	(Spain) César Azpilicueta (c)		(substituted off) 57'
CM	7	(France) N'Golo Kanté	(yellow card) 99'
CM	8	(Croatia) Mateo Kovačić	(yellow card) 90'	(substituted off) 106'
LM	3	(Spain) Marcos Alonso
AM	19	(England) Mason Mount		(substituted off) 74'
AM	10	(United States) Christian Pulisic		(substituted off) 74'
CF	29	(Germany) Kai Havertz	(yellow card) 105+2'
Substitutes:
GK	1	(Spain) Kepa Arrizabalaga		(substituted on) 120'
DF	24	(England) Reece James		(substituted on) 57'
DF	31	(France) Malang Sarr
MF	5	(Italy) Jorginho		(substituted on) 106'
MF	12	(England) Ruben Loftus-Cheek
MF	17	(Spain) Saúl
MF	20	(England) Callum Hudson-Odoi
FW	9	(Belgium) Romelu Lukaku		(substituted on) 74'
FW	11	(Germany) Timo Werner		(substituted on) 74'
Manager:
(Germany) Thomas Tuchel

GK	62	(Republic of Ireland) Caoimhín Kelleher
RB	66	(England) Trent Alexander-Arnold	(yellow card) 105+2'
CB	32	(Cameroon) Joël Matip		(substituted off) 91'
CB	4	(Netherlands) Virgil van Dijk
LB	26	(Scotland) Andy Robertson
CM	14	(England) Jordan Henderson (c)		(substituted off) 79'
CM	3	(Brazil) Fabinho
CM	8	(Guinea) Naby Keïta		(substituted off) 80'
RF	11	(Egypt) Mohamed Salah
CF	10	(Senegal) Sadio Mané		(substituted off) 80'
LF	23	(Colombia) Luis Díaz		(substituted off) 97'
Substitutes:
GK	1	(Brazil) Alisson
DF	5	(France) Ibrahima Konaté		(substituted on) 91'
DF	21	(Greece) Kostas Tsimikas
MF	7	(England) James Milner		(substituted on) 80'
MF	15	(England) Alex Oxlade-Chamberlain
MF	67	(England) Harvey Elliott		(substituted on) 79'
FW	18	(Japan) Takumi Minamino
FW	20	(Portugal) Diogo Jota		(substituted on) 80'
FW	27	(Belgium) Divock Origi		(substituted on) 97'
Manager:
(Germany) Jürgen Klopp

Man of the Match:
Virgil van Dijk (Liverpool)

Assistant referees:
Dan Cook (Manchester)
Daniel Robathan (Norfolk)
Fourth official:
Andrew Madley (Huddersfield)
Reserve assistant referee:
Tim Wood (Gloucestershire)
Video assistant referee:
Darren England (Doncaster)
Assistant video assistant referee:
Simon Bennett (Staffordshire)

Match rules

- 90 minutes
- 30 minutes of extra time if necessary
- Penalty shoot-out if scores still level
- Nine named substitutes
- Maximum of five substitutions, with a sixth allowed in extra time (Note: Each team was given only three opportunities to make substitutions, with a fourth opportunity in extra time, excluding substitutions made at half-time, before the start of extra time and at half-time in extra time.)

== Broadcasting ==
The match was broadcast in the United Kingdom by pay TV network Sky Sports, with an average of 3.16 million viewers and a peak of more than 4 million.
