= Curtis Jones (footballer, born 2001) =

English footballer

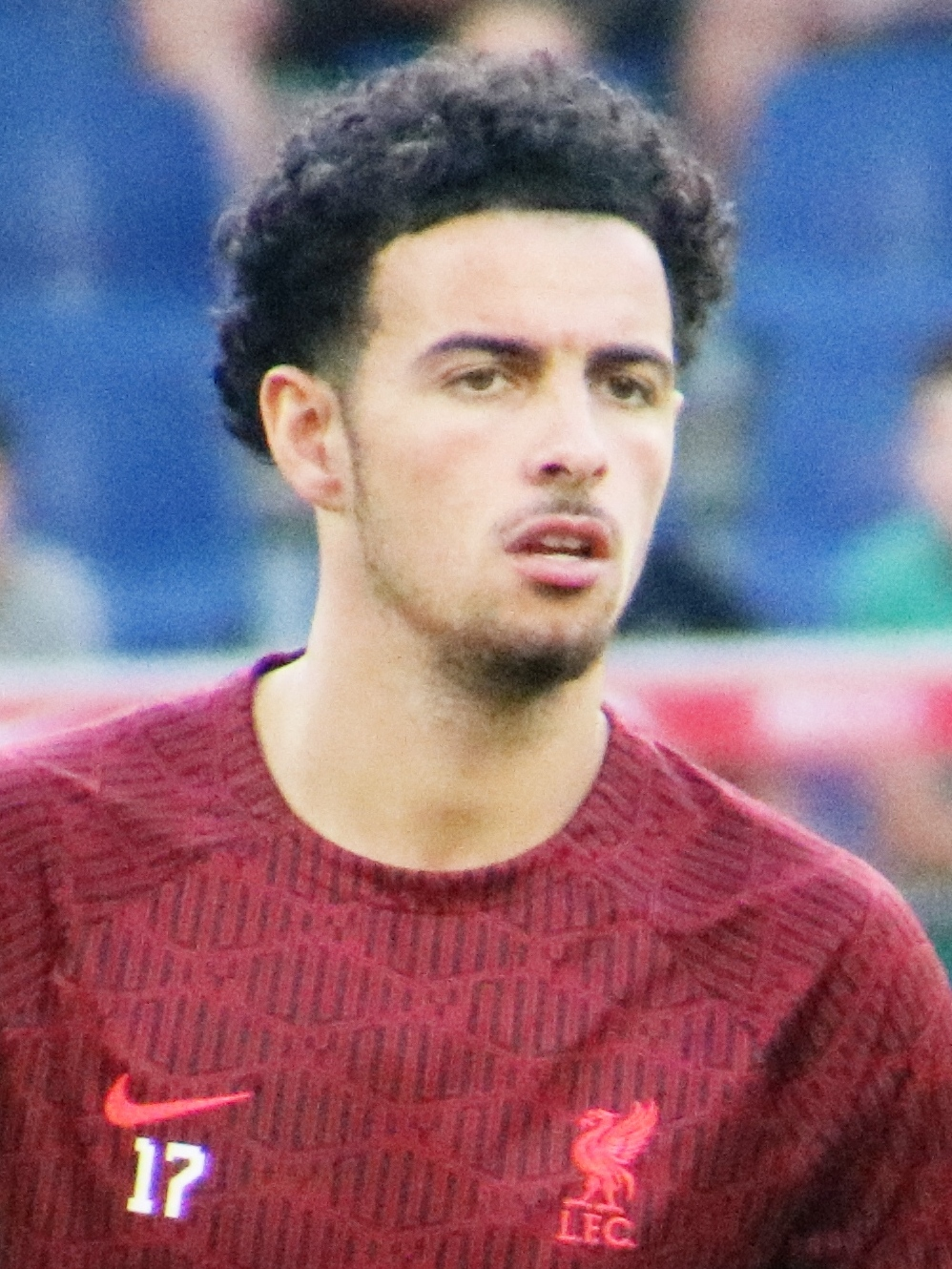
- Jones warming up for Liverpool in 2022

Personal information
- Full name: Curtis Julian Jones
- Date of birth: 30 January 2001 (age 25)
- Place of birth: Liverpool, Merseyside, England
- Height: 6 ft 1 in (1.85 m)
- Position: Midfielder

Team information
- Current team: Inter Milan
- Number: 21

Youth career
- 2010–2018: Liverpool

Senior career*
Years	Team	Apps	(Gls)
2018–2026	Liverpool	153	(11)
2026–	Inter Milan	5	(0)

International career^{‡}
2016–2017	England U16	4	(1)
2017	England U17	3	(0)
2018–2019	England U18	11	(1)
2019	England U19	4	(0)
2020–2023	England U21	20	(5)
2024–	England	6	(1)
Medal record
Men's football
Representing England
UEFA European Under-21 Championship
Winner	2023
- * Club domestic league appearances and goals as of 22 November 2026 (UTC) ‡ National team caps and goals as of 10 June 2025 (UTC)

Curtis Julian Jones (born 30 January 2001) is an English professional footballer who plays as a midfielder for Serie A club Inter Milan and the England national team.

Jones joined Liverpool's academy at the age of nine before signing his first professional contract with the club in February 2018. He made his first-team debut in 2019 and was a member of Liverpool's 2019–20 and 2024–25 Premier League winning squads prior to joining Inter Milan in 2026. He earned his first cap for the senior England team in November 2024, scoring on his debut.

== Early life ==
Curtis Julian Jones was born on 30 January 2001 in Liverpool, Merseyside, and grew up in the Toxteth area of the city. He is of Nigerian descent through his paternal grandmother.

== Club career ==
=== Liverpool ===
==== Early career ====
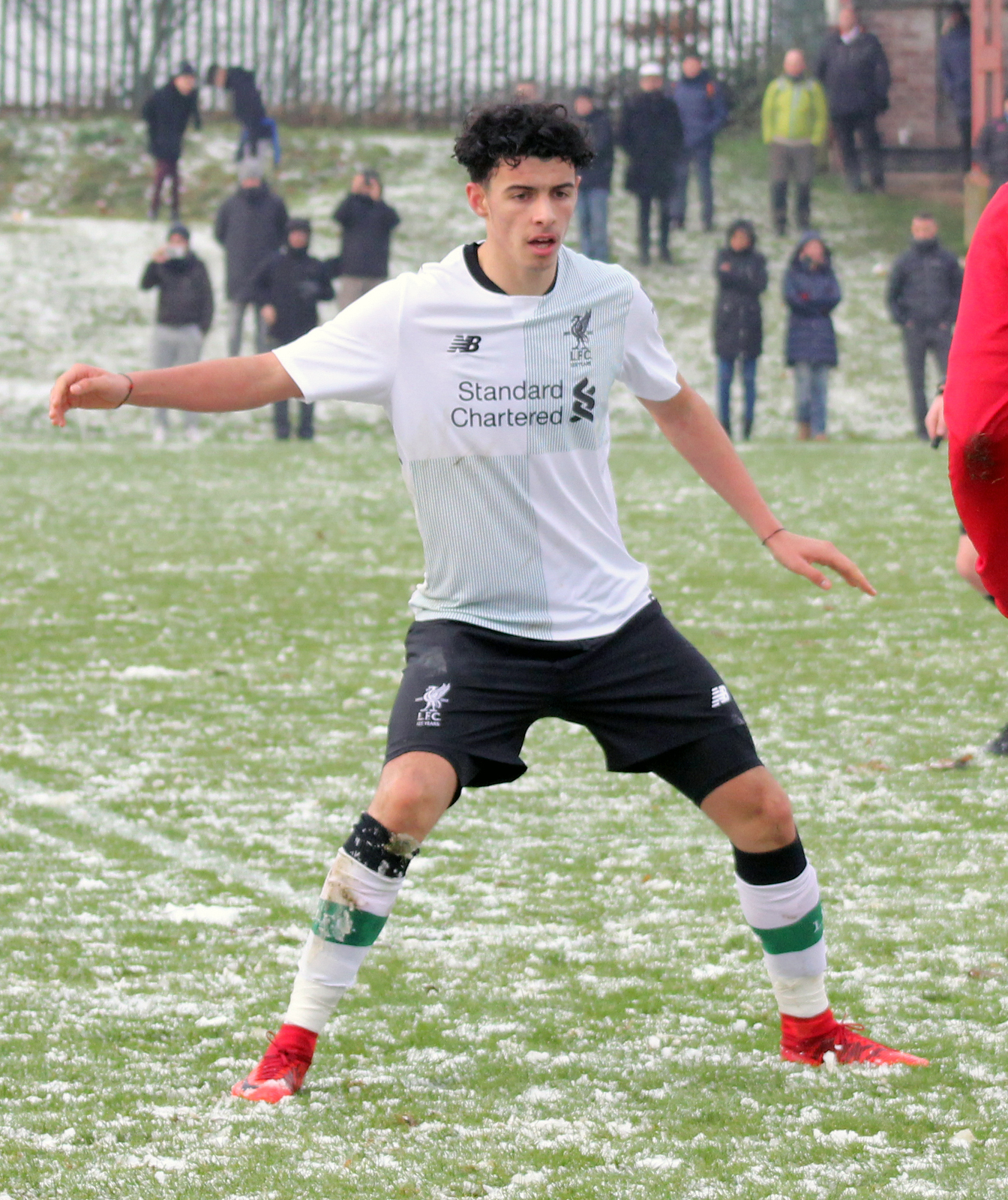
Jones playing for Liverpool U18 in 2017

Jones joined Liverpool at the age of nine. After making his U23s debut in January 2018, Jones signed his first professional contract on 1 February 2018. He was named in Liverpool's squad for the Premier League match against Everton on 7 April and was included on the substitute bench without making an appearance.

Jones featured prominently for Liverpool during pre-season ahead of the 2018–19 season. Manager Jürgen Klopp praised his mobility and dribbling skills. Jones made his first-team debut on 7 January 2019, in the 2018–19 FA Cup third round against Wolverhampton Wanderers.

==== 2019–20 season: First Premier League title ====
Jones made his season debut and played in his second competitive match for the club on 25 September 2019 in a 2019–20 EFL Cup match against Milton Keynes Dons. He was chosen as man of the match. He then scored the winning penalty in Liverpool's penalty shoot-out victory against Arsenal in the EFL Cup. He made his Premier League debut on 7 December, from the substitute's bench, against AFC Bournemouth.

On 5 January 2020, Jones was part of a Liverpool team largely made up of teenagers and reserves that beat rivals Everton 1–0 at home in the 2019–20 FA Cup. Jones scored the winning goal – his first for the club – with a curling shot from 20 yards. At 18 years and 340 days, Jones became the youngest goalscorer in a Merseyside derby since Robbie Fowler scored for Liverpool in 1994. In the next round three weeks later, he opened the scoring in a 2–2 draw away to Shrewsbury Town, becoming the first teenager to score in consecutive appearances for Liverpool since Raheem Sterling in April 2014. On 5 February 2020, Jones became Liverpool's youngest captain – at 19 years and 5 days – when he captained Liverpool's youngest ever first-team starting line-up with an average age of 19 years and 102 days to a 1–0 home victory over Shrewsbury in an FA Cup replay.

On 4 July 2020, Jones signed a new long-term contract with the club. He scored his first league goal for the club a day later after coming on as a substitute in a 2–0 win over Aston Villa, latching on to Mohamed Salah's header to score past former Liverpool goalkeeper Pepe Reina. On 22 July, Jones came off the bench against Chelsea for his fifth top-flight appearance in the 2019–20 season with Liverpool, thus qualifying for a Premier League winner's medal. On 30 July, Jones was named the Premier League 2 Player of the Season for 2019–20 ahead of five other nominees.

==== 2020–2023: FA Cup and EFL Cup double ====
On 24 September 2020, Jones scored two goals in four minutes against Lincoln City away in the 2020–21 EFL Cup, and was named man of the match by Sky Sports. He scored his first UEFA Champions League goal on 1 December in a 1–0 victory over Ajax, sealing Liverpool's progression into the knockout stages of the competition. On 28 February 2021, Jones scored his first league goal of the 2020–21 season in a 2–0 away win over Sheffield United.

Jones scored his first goal of the 2021–22 season on 25 September 2021 in a 3–3 away draw against Brentford. On 28 September, he provided two assists and a key pass in a 5–1 away win over Porto in the 2021–22 UEFA Champions League. Liverpool narrowly missed out on the chance to achieve a historic quadruple, coming second in the Premier League and the 2021–22 UEFA Champions League but winning both the EFL Cup and the FA Cup. On 17 November 2022, Jones signed a new long-term contract with Liverpool until June 2027.

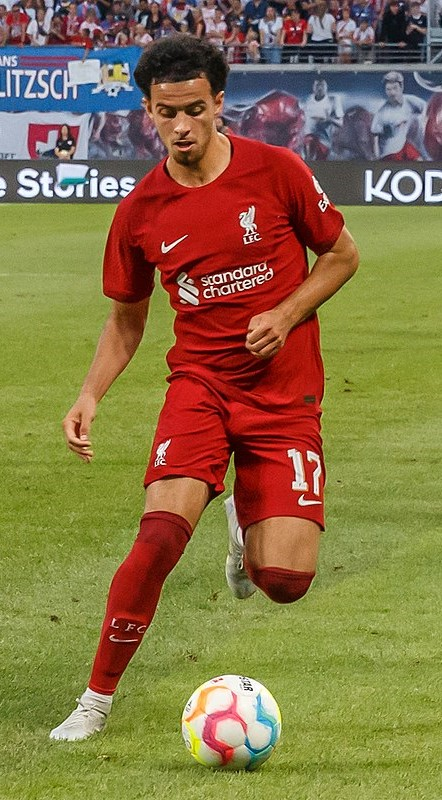
Jones playing for Liverpool in 2022

On 30 April 2023, Jones scored his first goal of the 2022–23 season in a 4–3 win against Tottenham Hotspur. On 15 May 2023, Jones continued his good form as a regular starter in the first team with a quick-fire brace against relegation threatened Leicester City in a man-of-the-match performance to guide Liverpool to a 3–0 away victory. At the end of the 2022–23 season, Liverpool narrowly missed out on UEFA Champions League qualification.

==== 2023–24 season: Second EFL Cup title ====
In the 2023–24 season, Jones was a regular starter, however, a suspension and an injury occurring in October and November allowed Ryan Gravenberch to take his place for a number of games. Commenting on his recent surge of confidence, Jones stated that he was "at the point now where" he was "in the team" and where he knew what he "[had] to do". Assistant manager Pepijn Lijnders attributed Jones' impressive recent return to form to his "Scouse mentality". On 30 September, Jones was controversially sent off in a Premier League away match against Tottenham Hotspur for a foul on Yves Bissouma. The foul was originally awarded a yellow card by referee Simon Hooper but was upgraded to a red card after he was shown a still image of the foul by the video assistant referee. The decision was criticised by many pundits including Gary Neville and Jamie Redknapp, the former of whom stated: "I think generally, he's gone in genuinely but his foot slips on top of the ball. I'm not sure, I never am nowadays, I'm less sure about football than I ever have been but I don't think he's gone in with any malice." Jones served a three-match suspension after a failed appeal.

Jones scored his first goals of the 2023–24 season in a 5–1 win over West Ham United at the quarter-final stage of the EFL Cup on 20 December 2023. Jones' second goal was Liverpool's 500th in the EFL Cup. He was awarded the man of the match award, and Jürgen Klopp stated that "It was a joy to watch him." On 17 February 2024, Jones suffered an ankle sprain injury in a 4–1 away win against Brentford and left the stadium on crutches. Klopp stated after the match: "Curtis Jones got a knock above his ankle. He wasn't 100 per cent sure what it was. The fact Curtis could not play on tells you something because he would have played on at all costs." The injury was later diagnosed as an ankle sprain. He was ruled out of the 2024 EFL Cup final against Chelsea in which Liverpool won 1–0 after extra time.

==== 2024–26: Second Premier League title and departure ====
Jones was unavailable for the match against Brentford on 25 August 2024 in which Liverpool won 2–0; Liverpool's new manager Arne Slot stated: “He picked up a little injury during the week and missed a couple of sessions, so will not be available to play." After his partner Saffron Khan gave birth in October 2024, Jones won a penalty and later scored the winning goal in Liverpool's 2–1 win over Chelsea on 20 October. Phil McNulty commended Jones for his "lively performance", and Rafael Benítez called his game "fantastic". Danny Murphy said: "I cannot think of a game where Jones has played better."

Jones scored his second goal of the season in a 3–3 draw against Newcastle United on 4 December, and his third and final goal of the 2024–25 season in a 3–1 win against Leicester City on 26 December. Jones suffered a second muscle injury of the season during a 2–1 victory over Lille in the Champions League on 21 January 2025, and was substituted at half-time for Harvey Elliott who scored the winning goal for Liverpool. Before his injury, he provided an assist via a "brilliant through ball" for Mohamed Salah for the first goal of the match. On 12 February 2025, after James Tarkowski scored a 98th minute equaliser for Everton in a 2–2 draw against Liverpool, Abdoulaye Doucouré taunted the Liverpool fans. Jones then confronted Doucouré, and both players were sent off. At the end of the season, Jones won the Premier League, his second league title for the club.

=== Inter Milan ===
On 21 August 2026, Jones signed for Serie A club Inter Milan for a fee of around €30 million, on a five-year contract.

== International career ==
Jones made his debut for the England national under-21 team on 7 October 2020 in a 3–3 draw against Andorra. He scored his first goal for the under-21s during a 3–1 home win over Andorra on 13 November. Jones was a member of the squad that were eliminated at the group stage of the 2021 UEFA European Under-21 Championship and scored in their last game against Croatia.

On 14 June 2023, Jones was included in the England squad for the 2023 UEFA European Under-21 Championship. On 8 July 2023, Jones was credited with the winning goal in the final against Spain after Cole Palmer's free kick deflected off him into the goal. He was named the man of the match for the final, which saw England win the tournament for the first time since 1984. His performances during the competition resulted in him being chosen by the UEFA Technical Observer panel for their team of the tournament.

On 21 May 2024, Jones received his first senior call-up as part of the 33-player preliminary squad for UEFA Euro 2024. However, he was later cut from the final 26-man squad.

He was called up by Lee Carsley for the UEFA Nations League ties in November 2024. On 14 November 2024, Jones earned his first England cap against Greece, and scored his first senior England goal with a backheel flick into the far corner in a UEFA Nations League match.

== Style of play ==
Jones is praised for his football IQ, ability to beat the press and create and finish goal scoring opportunities.

== Personal life ==
In October 2024, Jones and his partner Saffron Khan announced the birth of their first child, a daughter. Jones and Khan announced their engagement in June 2025.

== Career statistics ==
=== Club ===
As of match played 22 November 2026

Appearances and goals by club, season and competition
Club	Season	League			National cup (Note: Includes FA Cup, Coppa Italia)		League cup (Note: Includes EFL Cup)		Europe		Other		Total	
Club	Season	Division	Apps	Goals	Apps	Goals	Apps	Goals	Apps	Goals	Apps	Goals	Apps	Goals
Liverpool	2018–19	Premier League	0	0	1	0	0	0	0	0	—		1	0
Liverpool	2019–20	Premier League	6	1	4	2	2	0	0	0	0	0	12	3
Liverpool	2020–21	Premier League	24	1	2	0	2	2	5 (Note: Appearances in UEFA Champions League)	1	1 (Note: Appearance in FA Community Shield)	0	34	4
Liverpool	2021–22	Premier League	15	1	4	0	4	0	4	0	—		27	1
Liverpool	2022–23	Premier League	18	3	2	0	0	0	2	0	1	0	23	3
Liverpool	2023–24	Premier League	23	1	2	1	5	3	6 (Note: Appearances in UEFA Europa League)	0	—		36	5
Liverpool	2024–25	Premier League	33	3	0	0	5	0	8	0	—		46	3
Liverpool	2025–26	Premier League	34	1	4	2	1	0	9	0	1	0	49	3
Liverpool	Total		153	11	19	5	19	5	34	1	3	0	228	22
Inter Milan	2026–27	Serie A	5	0	0	0	—		1	0	0	0	6	0
Career total			158	11	19	5	19	5	35	1	3	0	234	22

=== International ===
As of match played 10 June 2025

Appearances and goals by national team and year
National team	Year	Apps	Goals
England	2024	2	1
England	2025	4	0
Total		6	1

As of match played 7 June 2025
England score listed first, score column indicates score after each Jones goal

List of international goals scored by Curtis Jones
No.	Date	Venue	Cap	Opponent	Score	Result	Competition	Ref.
1	14 November 2024	Olympic Stadium, Athens, Greece	1	Greece	3–0	3–0	2024–25 UEFA Nations League B	

== Honours ==
Liverpool

- Premier League: 2019–20, 2024–25
- FA Cup: 2021–22
- EFL Cup: 2021–22, 2023–24; runner-up: 2024–25
- FA Community Shield: 2022; runner-up: 2020, 2025
- UEFA Champions League runner-up: 2021–22
- FIFA Club World Cup: 2019

England U21

- UEFA European Under-21 Championship: 2023

Individual

- Premier League 2 Player of the Season: 2019–20
- UEFA European Under-21 Championship Team of the Tournament: 2023
