= 2022–23 Liverpool F.C. season =

English football club season

Liverpool F.C.
2022–23 season
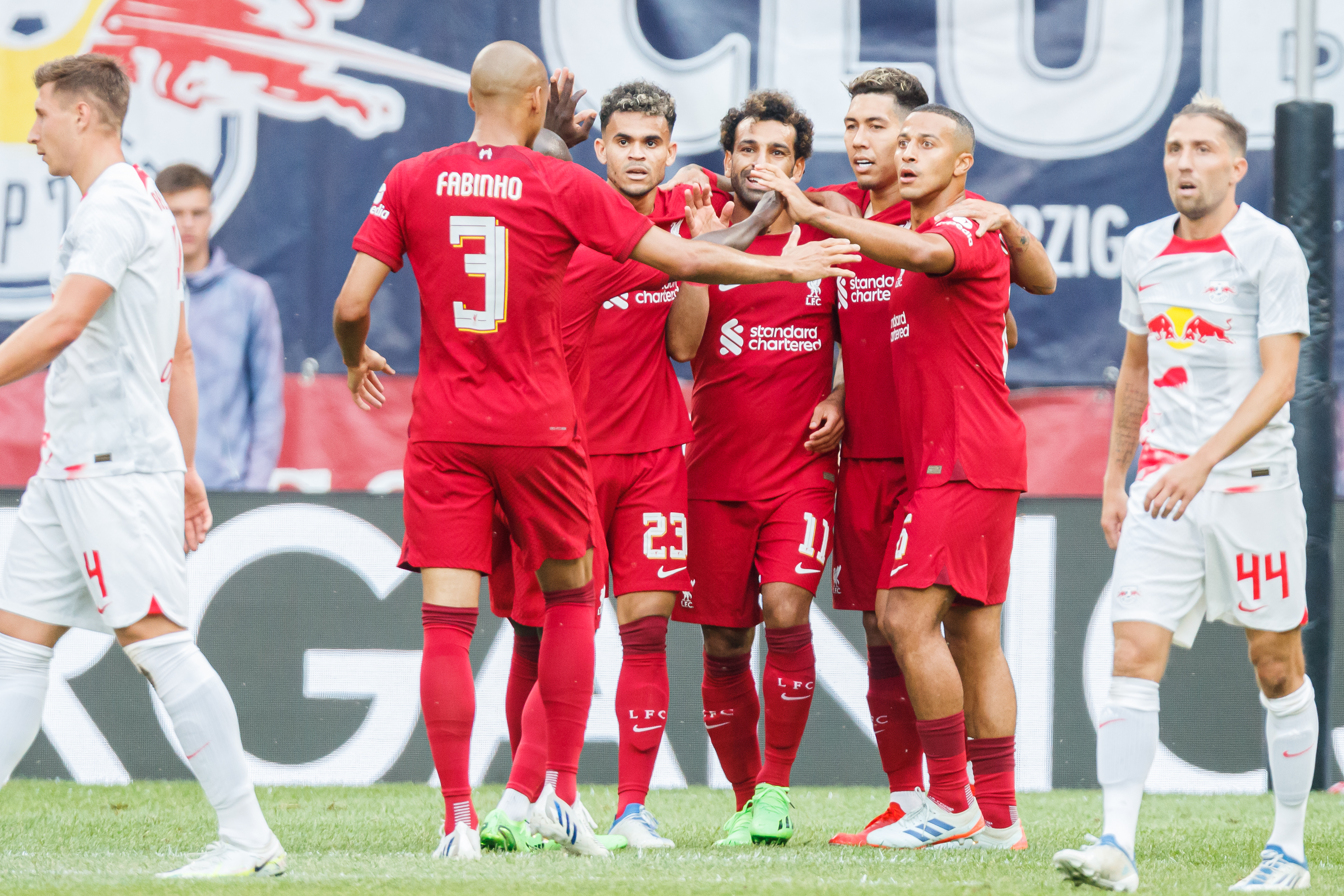
- Liverpool players in a pre-season friendly against RB Leipzig
- Owner: Fenway Sports Group
- Chairman: Tom Werner
- Manager: Jürgen Klopp
- Stadium: Anfield
- Premier League: 5th
- FA Cup: Fourth round
- EFL Cup: Fourth round
- FA Community Shield: Winners
- UEFA Champions League: Round of 16
- Top goalscorer: League: Mohamed Salah (19); All: Mohamed Salah (30)
Home colours	Away colours	Third colours

The 2022–23 season was Liverpool Football Club's 131st season in existence and their 61st consecutive season in the top flight of English football. Coming off their 2021–22 campaign, Liverpool competed in this season's editions of the Premier League, FA Cup, EFL Cup and the UEFA Champions League.

Liverpool kicked off the season with a 3–1 victory over reigning Premier League champions Manchester City in the FA Community Shield for their 16th Community Shield and 68th official trophy, the latter being an English record. Furthermore, that piece of silverware completed the set for Jürgen Klopp, to win all available first-tier trophies with Liverpool at least once.

After narrowly missing out on a possible quadruple the previous season, the 2022–23 campaign was a bitter disappointment for Liverpool. Inconsistent form in the Premier League ruled them out of the title race, whilst the Reds were knocked out of both cups in the fourth round. Liverpool's Champions League campaign also ended in disappointment as they lost 6–2 on aggregate to Real Madrid in the round of 16. Despite a 11-game unbeaten run in the league at the end of the season – including 7 straight victories – this was not enough to secure a top-four position and Liverpool ultimately finished 5th, failing to qualify for the next season's Champions League for the first time in seven years. Overall, the team's form was poor all season, which spurred major changes in the squad for the following campaign. As such, this season is widely considered as Liverpool's worst season under Klopp, with observers noting that some players' "legs had gone", particularly in midfield.

This season was the first since 2015–16 without Sadio Mané, who transferred to Bayern Munich and the first since 2014–15 without Divock Origi, who departed to AC Milan. At the end of the season, it was announced that Roberto Firmino, James Milner, Alex Oxlade-Chamberlain and Naby Keïta were confirmed to leave the club as their contracts would not be renewed.

== Season overview ==
On 30 July 2022, Liverpool opened the 2022–23 season by achieving victory in the 2022 FA Community Shield with a 3–1 win over Manchester City. On 27 August 2022, Liverpool achieved a 9–0 win over Bournemouth in the Premier League in which Roberto Firmino scored his 100th goal for Liverpool. The match was the joint-largest win in the history of the Premier League, and equalled Liverpool's biggest ever win in the top flight, achieving the same scoreline at Anfield in the 1989–90 season against Crystal Palace. The match was also Bournemouth's worst ever top-flight defeat. On 12 October 2022, Liverpool achieved a 7–1 away victory over Rangers in the UEFA Champions League. In the game, Mohamed Salah broke Bafétimbi Gomis's record for the fastest Champions League hat-trick of all time.

On 28 December 2022, Cody Gakpo agreed to sign for Liverpool for a transfer fee of between £35.4 to £44.3 million (€40 to €50 million) once the transfer window opened on 1 January 2023. On 5 March 2023, Liverpool recorded their biggest ever competitive win against Manchester United with an historic 7–0 victory at Anfield. Cody Gakpo, Darwin Núñez, and Mohamed Salah all scored braces with Roberto Firmino netting the final goal. This surpassed Liverpool’s previous record set in October 1895, a 7–1 victory in the Second Division. Furthermore, this was Manchester United's joint-biggest ever defeat and the heaviest since Wolverhampton Wanderers beat them by the same scoreline in 1931. On 10 March 2023, Liverpool announced Firmino would leave Liverpool at the end of the season after he decided not to extend his contract. Klopp stated that he was a "little bit surprised" by the decision but wished Firmino good luck, saying that he would “be grateful forever” for his contribution to Liverpool. On 20 May 2023, Roberto Firmino scored his last Liverpool goal at Anfield in a 1–1 draw against Aston Villa. Firmino also scored in his last ever game for Liverpool on 28 May 2023, being assisted by fellow Brazilian Fabinho.

=== Aftermath ===
Liverpool narrowly missed out on Champions League qualification, with winger Mohamed Salah describing himself as "totally devastated". It was suggested that reasons for their failure to qualify for the Champions League included the declining form of key members of the team Virgil van Dijk and Fabinho and the vast amount of injuries suffered by Liverpool players. On 21 May 2023, addressing the reality of being in the Europa League next season, Klopp stated that Liverpool would "make [the Europa League] our competition".

After the season ended, many prominent players departed the club. Captain Jordan Henderson left to join Al-Ettifaq for a reported transfer fee of £12 million and Fabinho left to join Al-Ittihad for £40 million. With the expiry of their contracts, Roberto Firmino, James Milner, Naby Keïta and Alex Oxlade-Chamberlain all departed the club. Following Jordan Henderson's departure, Virgil van Dijk was named as Liverpool's new captain on 31 July 2023. Trent Alexander-Arnold succeeded James Milner as vice-captain. With a midfield rebuild necessitated, Liverpool duly signed Alexis Mac Allister for £35 million and Dominik Szoboszlai for £60 million. Moreover, with attempts to sign first and second-choice defensive midfielders Moisés Caicedo and Roméo Lavia having failed, Liverpool signed Wataru Endo from Stuttgart for £16 million. Upon Endo’s transfer to Liverpool, Klopp stated on 18 August 2023 that he was “really happy” and also commented that the Japanese captain was also a “machine on the pitch”.

== Kits ==
Home	Away	Third	Third alt.	Home 2023–24
Goalkeeper 1	Goalkeeper 2	Goalkeeper 3

== First-team squad ==
No.	Player	Nationality	Date of birth (age)	Signed from	Apps	Goals	Assists
GK
1	Alisson Becker	(Brazil)	2 October 1992 (aged 30)	(Italy) Roma	231	1	3
13	Adrián	(Spain)	3 January 1987 (aged 36)	(England) West Ham United	26	0	0
62	Caoimhín Kelleher	(Republic of Ireland)	23 November 1998 (aged 24)	(England) LFC Academy	21	0	0
DF
2	Joe Gomez	(England)	23 May 1997 (aged 26)	(England) Charlton Athletic	173	0	6
4	Virgil van Dijk (3rd captain)	(Netherlands)	8 July 1991 (aged 31)	(England) Southampton	222	19	8
5	Ibrahima Konaté	(France)	25 May 1999 (aged 24)	(Germany) RB Leipzig	53	3	1
21	Kostas Tsimikas	(Greece)	12 May 1996 (aged 27)	(Greece) Olympiacos	61	0	12
22	Calvin Ramsay	(Scotland)	31 July 2003 (aged 19)	(Scotland) Aberdeen	2	0	0
26	Andy Robertson	(Scotland)	11 March 1994 (aged 29)	(England) Hull City	267	8	63
32	Joël Matip	(Cameroon)	8 August 1991 (aged 31)	(Germany) Schalke 04	187	11	6
46	Rhys Williams	(England)	3 February 2001 (aged 22)	(England) LFC Academy	19	0	0
47	Nat Phillips	(England)	21 March 1997 (aged 26)	(England) LFC Academy	29	1	1
66	Trent Alexander-Arnold (4th captain)	(England)	7 October 1998 (aged 24)	(England) LFC Academy	273	16	70
MF
3	Fabinho	(Brazil)	23 October 1993 (aged 29)	(France) Monaco	219	11	9
6	Thiago	(Spain)	11 April 1991 (aged 32)	(Germany) Bayern Munich	97	3	6
7	James Milner (vice-captain)	(England)	4 January 1986 (aged 37)	(England) Manchester City	332	26	45
8	Naby Keïta	(Guinea)	10 February 1995 (aged 28)	(Germany) RB Leipzig	129	11	6
14	Jordan Henderson (captain)	(England)	17 June 1990 (aged 33)	(England) Sunderland	492	33	58
15	Alex Oxlade-Chamberlain	(England)	15 August 1993 (aged 29)	(England) Arsenal	146	18	13
17	Curtis Jones	(England)	30 January 2001 (aged 22)	(England) LFC Academy	97	11	10
19	Harvey Elliott	(England)	4 April 2003 (aged 20)	(England) Fulham	66	6	3
29	Arthur	(Brazil)	12 August 1996 (aged 26)	(Italy) Juventus	1	0	0
43	Stefan Bajcetic	(Spain)	22 October 2004 (aged 18)	(England) LFC Academy	19	1	0
FW
9	Roberto Firmino	(Brazil)	2 October 1991 (aged 31)	(Germany) 1899 Hoffenheim	362	111	72
11	Mohamed Salah	(Egypt)	15 June 1992 (aged 31)	(Italy) Roma	305	186	74
18	Cody Gakpo	(Netherlands)	7 May 1999 (aged 24)	(Netherlands) PSV	26	7	2
20	Diogo Jota	(Portugal)	4 December 1996 (aged 26)	(England) Wolverhampton Wanderers	113	41	15
23	Luis Díaz	(Colombia)	13 January 1997 (aged 26)	(Portugal) Porto	47	11	6
27	Darwin Núñez	(Uruguay)	24 June 1999 (aged 24)	(Portugal) Benfica	42	15	4
28	Fábio Carvalho	(Portugal)	30 August 2002 (aged 20)	(England) Fulham	21	3	0

=== New contracts ===
Date	Pos.	No.	Player	Ref.
6 June 2022	MF	7	(England) James Milner	
1 July 2022	FW	11	(Egypt) Mohamed Salah	
7 July 2022	DF	2	(England) Joe Gomez	
2 August 2022	FW	20	(Portugal) Diogo Jota	
11 August 2022	MF	19	(England) Harvey Elliott	
30 August 2022	DF	72	(Netherlands) Sepp van den Berg	
17 November 2022	MF	17	(England) Curtis Jones	
11 January 2023	MF	80	(England) Tyler Morton	
26 January 2023	MF	43	(Spain) Stefan Bajcetic	

== Transfers ==
=== In ===
Date	Pos.	No.	Player	From	Fee	Ref.
1 July 2022	FW	27	(Uruguay) Darwin Núñez	(Portugal) Benfica	£64,000,000 (Note: Fee may eventually rise to £86,000,000)	
1 July 2022	DF	22	(Scotland) Calvin Ramsay	(Scotland) Aberdeen	£4,200,000 (Note: Fee may eventually rise to £6,500,000)	
1 July 2022	FW	50	(Scotland) Ben Gannon-Doak	(Scotland) Celtic	£600,000	
1 July 2022	FW	28	(Portugal) Fábio Carvalho	(England) Fulham	£5,000,000 (Note: Fee may eventually rise to £7,700,000)	
1 January 2023	FW	18	(Netherlands) Cody Gakpo	(Netherlands) PSV	£37,000,000 (Note: Fee may eventually rise to £40,000,000)	

=== Out ===
Date	Pos.	No.	Player	To	Fee	Ref.
30 June 2022	GK	22	(Germany) Loris Karius	(England) Newcastle United	Free agent	
30 June 2022	FW	27	(Belgium) Divock Origi	(Italy) A.C. Milan	Free agent	
30 June 2022	MF	45	(England) Elijah Dixon-Bonner	(England) Queens Park Rangers	Free agent	
30 June 2022	FW	54	(England) Sheyi Ojo	(Wales) Cardiff City	Free agent	
30 June 2022	MF	58	(Wales) Ben Woodburn	(England) Preston North End	Free agent	
1 July 2022	FW	10	(Senegal) Sadio Mané	(Germany) Bayern Munich	£27,500,000 (Note: Fee may eventually rise to £35,100,000)	
1 July 2022	FW	18	(Japan) Takumi Minamino	(France) AS Monaco	£13,000,000 (Note: Fee may eventually rise to £15,500,000)	
11 July 2022	DF	76	(Wales) Neco Williams	(England) Nottingham Forest	£16,000,000 (Note: Fee may eventually rise to £17,500,000)	
19 July 2022	DF	24	(England) Ben Davies	(Scotland) Rangers	£3,000,000 (Note: Fee may eventually rise to £4,000,000)	
16 January 2023	MF	64	(England) Jake Cain	(England) Swindon Town	Undisclosed	

=== Loans in ===
Start date	End date	Pos.	No.	Player	From club	Fee	Ref.
1 September 2022	End of season	MF	29	(Brazil) Arthur	(Italy) Juventus	£3,900,000 (Note: With an option to buy for £32,325,000.)	

=== Loans out ===
Start date	End date	Pos.	No.	Player	To club	Fee	Ref.
1 July 2022	17 January 2023 (Note: On 17 January, Ojrzyński was recalled from his loan with Radomiak Radom. Liverpool had not announced the original length of the loan.)	GK	75	(Poland) Jakub Ojrzyński	(Poland) Radomiak Radom	None	
1 July 2022	End of season	DF	84	(Northern Ireland) Conor Bradley	(England) Bolton Wanderers	None	
1 July 2022	20 January 2023 (Note: On 20 January, Balagizi was recalled from his season-long loan at Crawley, having sustained an injury.)	MF	85	(England) James Balagizi	(England) Crawley Town	None	
1 July 2022	10 January 2023 (Note: On 10 January, Koumetio was recalled from his loan with Austria Wien. Liverpool had not announced the original length of the loan.)	DF	89	(France) Billy Koumetio	Austria Wien	None	
1 July 2022	End of season	GK	97	(Brazil) Marcelo Pitaluga	(England) Macclesfield	None	
1 July 2022	End of season	DF	—	(England) Adam Lewis	(England) Newport County	None	
4 July 2022	End of season	GK	56	(Czech Republic) Vítězslav Jaroš	(England) Stockport County	None	
9 July 2022	End of season	DF	—	(Colombia) Anderson Arroyo	(Spain) Alavés	None	
11 July 2022	30 August 2022 (Note: On 30 August, Beck was recalled from his season-long loan at Famalicão and was subsequently loaned to Bolton.)	DF	63	(Wales) Owen Beck	(Portugal) Famalicão	None	
19 July 2022	23 January 2023 (Note: On 23 January, Williams was recalled from his season-long loan at Blackpool.)	DF	46	(England) Rhys Williams	(England) Blackpool	None	
1 August 2022	End of season	MF	80	(England) Tyler Morton	(England) Blackburn Rovers	None	
5 August 2022	End of season	MF	65	(England) Leighton Clarkson	(Scotland) Aberdeen	None	
30 August 2022	End of season	DF	72	(Netherlands) Sepp van den Berg	(Germany) Schalke 04	None	
31 August 2022	26 January 2023 (Note: On 26 January, Beck was recalled from his season-long loan at Bolton.)	DF	63	(Wales) Owen Beck	(England) Bolton Wanderers	None	
1 September 2022	End of season	FW	68	(England) Jack Bearne	(England) Kidderminster Harriers	None	
1 September 2022	End of season	FW	—	(Germany) Paul Glatzel	(England) Tranmere Rovers	None	
1 September 2022	20 January 2023 (Note: On 20 January, O'Rourke was recalled from his season-long loan with Caernarfon.)	FW	69	(England) Fidel O'Rourke	(Wales) Caernarfon Town	None	
1 September 2022	16 January 2023 (Note: On 16 January, Woltman was recalled from his season-long loan at Doncaster.)	FW	82	(England) Max Woltman	(England) Doncaster Rovers	None	
20 January 2023	End of season	DF	78	(England) Jarell Quansah	(England) Bristol Rovers	None	
30 January 2023	End of season	DF	88	(England) Luke Chambers	(Scotland) Kilmarnock	None	
31 January 2023	End of season	FW	69	(England) Fidel O'Rourke	(England) FC Halifax Town	None	

=== Transfer summary ===
Spending

Summer: ▼£ 73,200,000

Winter: ▼£ 37,000,000

Total: ▼£ 110,200,000

Income

Summer: ▲£ 59,500,000

Winter: £ 0

Total: ▲£ 59,500,000

Net Expenditure

Summer: ▼£ 13,700,000

Winter: ▼£ 37,000,000

Total: ▼£ 50,700,000

== Pre-season and friendlies ==
Liverpool announced they would be touring South East Asia, starting with a match against rivals Manchester United in Bangkok on 12 July, followed by a trip to Singapore to face Crystal Palace on 15 July. On 16 June, the Reds announced a further two pre-season matches, against RB Leipzig and Strasbourg, and later announced another friendly against Red Bull Salzburg in Austria on 27 July.

During the mid-season break as a result of the 2022 FIFA World Cup, Liverpool announced they would be travelling to Dubai to take part in the Dubai Super Cup friendly tournament, facing Lyon and Milan on 11 and 16 December, respectively.

Win Draw Loss Fixtures

12 July 2022 Bangkok Century Cup	Manchester United	4–0	Liverpool	Bangkok, Thailand
20:00 ICT	Sancho 12'; Fred 30'; Martial 33'; Pellistri 76'	Report		Stadium: Rajamangala Stadium; Attendance: 50,248; Referee: Andre Marriner

15 July 2022 Friendly	Liverpool	2–0	Crystal Palace	Kallang, Singapore
20:35 SGT	Henderson 12'; Salah 46'	Report		Stadium: National Stadium; Attendance: 50,217; Referee: Muhammad Taqi

21 July 2022 Friendly	RB Leipzig	0–5	Liverpool	Leipzig, Germany
19:15 CEST		Report	Salah 8'; Núñez 48' (pen.), 51', 68', 89'	Stadium: Red Bull Arena; Attendance: 47,069; Referee: Felix Zwayer (Germany)

27 July 2022 Friendly	Red Bull Salzburg	1–0	Liverpool	Salzburg, Austria
20:00 CEST	Van Der Brempt (yellow card) 3'; Šeško 31'; Šimić (yellow card) 65'	Report	Fabinho (yellow card) 89'	Stadium: Red Bull Arena; Attendance: 29,520; Referee: Stefan Ebner (Austria)

31 July 2022 Friendly	Liverpool	0–3	Strasbourg	Liverpool
19:30 BST		Report	Thomasson 4', 21'; Diallo 14'	Stadium: Anfield; Attendance: 44,000; Referee: Darren England (England)

11 December 2022 Dubai Super Cup	Liverpool	1–3 (3–5 p)	Lyon	Dubai, United Arab Emirates
18:00 GST	Carvalho 1'; Salah (penalty missed) 14'; Bajcetic (yellow card) 23'	Report	Lacazette 41', 82'; Barcola 65'	Stadium: Al Maktoum Stadium; Attendance: 14,851; Referee: Ahmed Essa Mohamed (United Arab Emirates)
	Penalties
	Tsimikas (penalty scored); Ramsay (penalty missed); Oxlade-Chamberlain (penalty scored); Keïta (penalty scored)		(penalty scored) Caqueret; (penalty scored) Barcola; (penalty scored) Cherki; (penalty scored) Tetê; (penalty scored) Da Silva
Note: Lyon gained 4 points from this fixture: 3 for the victory in 90 minutes, and 1 for the penalty shoot-out victory.

16 December 2022 Dubai Super Cup	Liverpool	4–1 (3–4 p)	Milan	Dubai, United Arab Emirates
19:30 GST	Salah 5'; Thiago 41'; Núñez 82', 88'	Report	Saelemaekers 29'	Stadium: Al Maktoum Stadium; Attendance: 15,000; Referee: Omar Mohamed Al Ali (United Arab Emirates)
	Penalties
	Tsimikas (penalty missed); Keïta (penalty missed); Carvalho (penalty scored); Clark (penalty scored); Núñez (penalty scored)		(penalty scored) Bennacer; (penalty scored) Bakayoko; (penalty missed) Adli; (penalty scored) El Hilali; (penalty scored) Kalulu
Note: Liverpool gained 3 points from this fixture for the victory in 90 minutes, and Milan gained 1 point for the penalty shoot-out victory.

== Competitions ==
=== Overall record ===
Competition	First match	Last match	Starting round	Final position	Record							
Competition	First match	Last match	Starting round	Final position	Pld	W	D	L	GF	GA	GD	Win %
Premier League	6 August 2022	28 May 2023	Matchday 1	5th	38	19	10	9	75	47	+28	50.00
FA Cup	7 January 2023	29 January 2023	Third round	Fourth round	3	1	1	1	4	4	+0	33.33
EFL Cup	9 November 2022	22 December 2022	Third round	Fourth round	2	0	1	1	2	3	−1	0.00
UEFA Champions League	7 September 2022	15 March 2023	Group stage	Round of 16	8	5	0	3	19	12	+7	62.50
FA Community Shield	30 July 2022		Final	Winners	1	1	0	0	3	1	+2	100.00
Total					52	26	12	14	103	67	+36	50.00

Source: Soccerway

=== Premier League ===
==== League table ====
Pos	Team	Pld	W	D	L	GF	GA	GD	Pts	Qualification or relegation
3	Manchester United	38	23	6	9	58	43	+15	75	Qualification to Champions League group stage
4	Newcastle United	38	19	14	5	68	33	+35	71	Qualification to Champions League group stage
5	Liverpool	38	19	10	9	75	47	+28	67	Qualification to Europa League group stage (Note: Since the winners of the 2022–23 FA Cup, Manchester City, qualified for the Champions League, the spot given to the FA Cup winners (Europa League group stage) was passed to the sixth-placed team.)
6	Brighton & Hove Albion	38	18	8	12	72	53	+19	62	Qualification to Europa League group stage
7	Aston Villa	38	18	7	13	51	46	+5	61	Qualification to Europa Conference League play-off round (Note: Since the winners of the 2022–23 EFL Cup, Manchester United, qualified for the Champions League, the spot given to the League Cup winners (Europa Conference League play-off round) was passed to the seventh-placed team.)

Source: Premier League
Rules for classification: 1) Points; 2) Goal difference; 3) Goals scored; 4) If the champions, relegated teams or qualified teams for UEFA competitions cannot be determined by rules 1 to 3, rules 4.1 to 4.3 are applied – 4.1) Points gained in head-to-head record between such teams; 4.2) Away goals scored in head-to-head record between such teams; 4.3) Play-offs

==== Results summary ====
Overall								Home						Away					
Pld	W	D	L	GF	GA	GD	Pts	W	D	L	GF	GA	GD	W	D	L	GF	GA	GD
38	19	10	9	75	47	+28	67	13	5	1	46	17	+29	6	5	8	29	30	−1

Source: Premier League

==== Results by round ====
Round	1	2	3	4	5	6	9	10	11	12	13	14	15	16	17	18	19	20	21	22	23	24	25	7^{1}	26	27	29	8^{1}	30	31	32	33	34	28^{2}	35	36	37	38
Ground	A	H	A	H	H	A	H	A	H	H	A	H	A	H	A	H	A	A	H	A	H	A	A	H	H	A	A	A	H	A	H	A	H	H	H	A	H	A
Result	D	D	L	W	W	D	D	L	W	W	L	L	W	W	W	W	L	L	D	L	W	W	D	W	W	L	L	D	D	W	W	W	W	W	W	W	D	D
Position	12	12	16	9	6	7	8	9	7	7	8	9	8	6	6	6	6	9	9	10	9	8	7	6	5	6	8	8	8	8	7	7	5	5	5	5	5	5
Points	1	2	2	5	8	9	10	10	13	16	16	16	19	22	25	28	28	28	29	29	32	35	36	39	42	42	42	43	44	47	50	53	56	59	62	65	66	67

Source: Premier League
A = Away; H = Home; W = Win; D = Draw; L = Loss
Notes:
^{1} Matchday 7 (vs. Wolverhampton Wanderers) and matchday 8 (vs. Chelsea) were both postponed due to the death of Queen Elizabeth II.
^{2} Matchday 28 (vs. Fulham) was postponed due to Fulham's fixtures in the FA Cup.

==== Matches ====
Win Draw Loss Fixtures

The league fixtures were announced on 16 June 2022, with the season starting on 6 August.

6 August 2022 1	Fulham	2–2	Liverpool	Fulham
12:30 BST	Tete (yellow card) 17'; Mitrović 32', 72' (pen.); Decordova-Reid (yellow card) 90+1'	Report	Núñez 64'; Salah 81'	Stadium: Craven Cottage; Attendance: 22,207; Referee: Andy Madley

15 August 2022 2	Liverpool	1–1	Crystal Palace	Liverpool
20:00 BST	Díaz (yellow card) 40', (goal) 61'; Núñez (red card) 57'; Tsimikas (yellow card) 90+2'	Report	Zaha 32'; Andersen (yellow card) 44'; Ward (yellow card) 68'; Édouard (yellow card) 88'; Guaita (yellow card) 90+1'	Stadium: Anfield; Attendance: 52,970; Referee: Paul Tierney

22 August 2022 3	Manchester United	2–1	Liverpool	Trafford
20:00 BST	Sancho 16'; Varane (yellow card) 27'; Dalot (yellow card) 45'; Rashford 53'; Fernandes (yellow card) 74'	Report	Alexander-Arnold (yellow card) 24'; Salah 81'	Stadium: Old Trafford; Attendance: 74,147; Referee: Michael Oliver

27 August 2022 4	Liverpool	9–0	Bournemouth	Liverpool
15:00 BST	Díaz 3', 85'; Elliott 6'; Alexander-Arnold 28'; Firmino 31', 62'; Van Dijk 45'; Mepham 46' (o.g.); Carvalho 80'	Report	Smith (yellow card) 35'	Stadium: Anfield; Attendance: 53,328; Referee: Stuart Attwell

31 August 2022 5	Liverpool	2–1	Newcastle United	Liverpool
20:00 BST	Firmino 61'; Carvalho 90+8'	Report	Isak 38'; Lascelles (yellow card) 87'; Trippier (yellow card) 90'	Stadium: Anfield; Attendance: 53,316; Referee: Andre Marriner

3 September 2022 6	Everton	0–0	Liverpool	Walton
12:30 BST	Onana (yellow card) 38'; Pickford (yellow card) 90+6'	Report	Van Dijk (yellow card) 76'; Fabinho (yellow card) 90+2'	Stadium: Goodison Park; Attendance: 39,240; Referee: Anthony Taylor

1 October 2022 9	Liverpool	3–3	Brighton & Hove Albion	Liverpool
15:00 BST	Firmino 33', 54'; Webster 63' (o.g.); Alexander-Arnold (yellow card) 86'	Report	Trossard 4', 17', 83'; Estupiñán (yellow card) 29'	Stadium: Anfield; Attendance: 53,336; Referee: Andy Madley

9 October 2022 10	Arsenal	3–2	Liverpool	Holloway
16:30 BST	Martinelli 1'; Ødegaard (yellow card) 45+4'; Saka 45+5', 76' (pen.)	Report	Díaz (yellow card) 6'; Núñez 34'; Firmino 53'; Gomez (yellow card) 71'	Stadium: Emirates Stadium; Attendance: 60,059; Referee: Michael Oliver

16 October 2022 11	Liverpool	1–0	Manchester City	Liverpool
16:30 BST	Fabinho (yellow card) 63'; Salah 76'; Thiago (yellow card) 84'; Klopp (red card) 86'; Jota (yellow card) 90'	Report	Akanji (yellow card) 78'	Stadium: Anfield; Attendance: 53,286; Referee: Anthony Taylor

19 October 2022 12	Liverpool	1–0	West Ham United	Liverpool
19:30 BST	Núñez 22'	Report	Bowen (penalty missed) 45'	Stadium: Anfield; Attendance: 53,346; Referee: Stuart Attwell

22 October 2022 13	Nottingham Forest	1–0	Liverpool	West Bridgford
12:30 BST	Awoniyi 55'; Worrall (yellow card) 88'; Freuler (yellow card) 89'	Report	Gomez (yellow card) 54'	Stadium: City Ground; Attendance: 29,245; Referee: Paul Tierney

29 October 2022 14	Liverpool	1–2	Leeds United	Liverpool
19:45 BST	Salah 14'	Report	Rodrigo 4'; Summerville 89', (yellow card) 90'	Stadium: Anfield; Attendance: 53,274; Referee: Michael Oliver

6 November 2022 15	Tottenham Hotspur	1–2	Liverpool	Tottenham
16:30 GMT	Kane 70'	Report	Salah 11', 40'	Stadium: Tottenham Hotspur Stadium; Attendance: 62,008; Referee: Andy Madley

12 November 2022 16	Liverpool	3–1	Southampton	Liverpool
15:00 GMT	Firmino 6'; Núñez 21', 42'	Report	Ćaleta-Car (yellow card) 5'; Adams 9'; Salisu (yellow card) 66'	Stadium: Anfield; Attendance: 53,331; Referee: Simon Hooper

26 December 2022 17	Aston Villa	1–3	Liverpool	Birmingham
17:30 GMT	Watkins 59'	Report	Salah 5'; Van Dijk 37'; Bajcetic 81'	Stadium: Villa Park; Attendance: 42,085; Referee: Paul Tierney

30 December 2022 18	Liverpool	2–1	Leicester City	Liverpool
20:00 GMT	Faes 38', 45' (o.g.)	Report	Dewsbury-Hall 4'; Soumaré (yellow card) 67'	Stadium: Anfield; Attendance: 53,343; Referee: Craig Pawson

2 January 2023 19	Brentford	3–1	Liverpool	Brentford
17:30 GMT	Jørgensen (yellow card) 2'; Konaté 19' (o.g.); Wissa 42'; Mbeumo 84'	Report	Elliott (yellow card) 19'; Oxlade-Chamberlain 50'; Thiago (yellow card) 57'; Núñez (yellow card) 72'	Stadium: Brentford Community Stadium; Attendance: 17,163; Referee: Stuart Attwell

14 January 2023 20	Brighton & Hove Albion	3–0	Liverpool	Brighton and Hove
15:00 GMT	Dunk (yellow card) 17'; March 46', 53'; Welbeck 81'	Report	Matip (yellow card) 18'; Henderson (yellow card) 30'; Alexander-Arnold (yellow card) 65'	Stadium: Falmer Stadium; Attendance: 31,645; Referee: Darren England

21 January 2023 21	Liverpool	0–0	Chelsea	Liverpool
12:30 GMT	Bajcetic (yellow card) 34'; Milner (yellow card) 66'; Jones (yellow card) 90'	Report	Chalobah (yellow card) 80'	Stadium: Anfield; Attendance: 53,126; Referee: Michael Oliver

4 February 2023 22	Wolverhampton Wanderers	3–0	Liverpool	Wolverhampton
15:00 GMT	Matip 5' (o.g.); Dawson 12', (yellow card) 45+4'; Neves 71'	Report	Gomez (yellow card) 75'	Stadium: Molineux Stadium; Attendance: 31,664; Referee: Paul Tierney

13 February 2023 23	Liverpool	2–0	Everton	Liverpool
20:00 GMT	Salah 37'; Gakpo 49'; Robertson (yellow card) 87'	Report	Coady (yellow card) 67'; Doucouré (yellow card) 84'; Pickford (yellow card) 87'	Stadium: Anfield; Attendance: 53,027; Referee: Simon Hooper

18 February 2023 24	Newcastle United	0–2	Liverpool	Newcastle upon Tyne
17:30 GMT	Pope (red card) 22'; Almirón (yellow card) 37'	Report	Núñez 10'; Gakpo 17'; Fabinho (yellow card) 20'	Stadium: St James' Park; Attendance: 52.758; Referee: Anthony Taylor

25 February 2023 25	Crystal Palace	0–0	Liverpool	Croydon
19:45 GMT	Clyne (yellow card) 26'; Andersen (yellow card) 90+4'	Report	Keïta (yellow card) 23'; Henderson (yellow card) 67'; Fabinho (yellow card) 77'; Matip (yellow card) 82'; Robertson (yellow card) 90+3'	Stadium: Selhurst Park; Attendance: 25,842; Referee: Darren England

1 March 2023 7	Liverpool	2–0	Wolverhampton Wanderers	Liverpool
20:00 GMT	Bajcetic (yellow card) 15'; Fabinho (yellow card) 53'; Van Dijk 73'; Salah 77'	Report	Semedo (yellow card) 36'; Sarabia (yellow card) 45+4'; Neves (yellow card) 68'	Stadium: Anfield; Attendance: 53,259; Referee: Paul Tierney
Note: The match was originally scheduled to be played on 10 September 2022, but was included in the league-wide postponement due to the death of Queen Elizabeth II.

5 March 2023 26	Liverpool	7–0	Manchester United	Liverpool
16:30 GMT	Fabinho (yellow card) 41'; Gakpo 43', 50'; Núñez 47', 75'; Salah 66', 83', (yellow card) 84'; Firmino 88'	Report	Antony (yellow card) 53'; Martínez (yellow card) 61'; McTominay (yellow card) 64'	Stadium: Anfield; Attendance: 53,001; Referee: Andy Madley

11 March 2023 27	Bournemouth	1–0	Liverpool	Bournemouth
12:30 GMT	Billing 28', (yellow card) 46'; Anthony (yellow card) 51'	Report	Salah (penalty missed) 69'; Konaté (yellow card) 75'	Stadium: Vitality Stadium; Attendance: 10,536; Referee: John Brooks

1 April 2023 29	Manchester City	4–1	Liverpool	Manchester
12:30 BST	Álvarez 27'; Rodri (yellow card) 33'; De Bruyne 46'; Gündoğan 53'; Grealish 74'	Report	Salah 17', (yellow card) 20'	Stadium: Etihad Stadium; Attendance: 52,877; Referee: Simon Hooper

4 April 2023 8	Chelsea	0–0	Liverpool	Fulham
20:00 BST	Kovačić (yellow card) 68'	Report	Matip (yellow card) 46'; Tsimikas (yellow card) 56'; Jones (yellow card) 61'; Fabinho (yellow card) 74'	Stadium: Stamford Bridge; Attendance: 40,093; Referee: Anthony Taylor
Note: The match was originally scheduled to be played on 18 September 2022, but was postponed due to police concerns, related to the Funeral of Elizabeth II which required significant police resources and was to be held the Monday immediately following the proposed scheduling of the match.

9 April 2023 30	Liverpool	2–2	Arsenal	Liverpool
16:30 BST	Van Dijk (yellow card) 31'; Alexander-Arnold (yellow card) 41'; Salah 42', (penalty missed) 54'; Robertson (yellow card) 45+6'; Fabinho (yellow card) 55'; Firmino 87'	Report	Martinelli 8'; White (yellow card) 23'; Gabriel Jesus 28'; Xhaka (yellow card) 41'; Ramsdale (yellow card) 53'; Saka (yellow card) 84'	Stadium: Anfield; Attendance: 53,267; Referee: Paul Tierney

17 April 2023 31	Leeds United	1–6	Liverpool	Leeds
20:00 BST	Sinisterra 47'	Report	Gakpo 35'; Salah 39', 64'; Fabinho (yellow card) 42'; Jota 52', 73'; Núñez 90'	Stadium: Elland Road; Attendance: 36,657; Referee: Craig Pawson

22 April 2023 32	Liverpool	3–2	Nottingham Forest	Liverpool
15:00 BST	Jota 47', 55'; Salah 70'	Report	Williams 51', (yellow card) 83'; Gibbs-White 67'	Stadium: Anfield; Attendance: 53,325; Referee: Michael Oliver

26 April 2023 33	West Ham United	1–2	Liverpool	Stratford
19:45 BST	Paquetá 12'	Report	Gakpo 18'; Matip 67'	Stadium: London Stadium; Attendance: 62,473; Referee: Chris Kavanagh

30 April 2023 34	Liverpool	4–3	Tottenham Hotspur	Liverpool
16:30 BST	Jones 3'; Díaz 6'; Salah 15' (pen.); Konaté (yellow card) 70'; Jota (yellow card) 81', (goal) 90+4'; Milner (yellow card) 90+1'	Report	Kane 39'; Son (yellow card) 52', (goal) 77'; Richarlison 90+3', (yellow card) 90+4'	Stadium: Anfield; Attendance: 53,275; Referee: Paul Tierney

3 May 2023 28	Liverpool	1–0	Fulham	Liverpool
20:00 BST	Salah 39' (pen.)	Report		Stadium: Anfield; Attendance: 52,602; Referee: Stuart Attwell
Note: The match was originally scheduled to be played on 18 March 2023, but was postponed due to Fulham’s participation in the FA Cup quarter-finals.

6 May 2023 35	Liverpool	1–0	Brentford	Liverpool
17:30 BST	Van Dijk (yellow card) 5'; Salah 13'; Fabinho (yellow card) 42'; Konaté (yellow card) 54'; Alisson (yellow card) 77'	Report	Mbeumo (yellow card) 27'; Henry (yellow card) 70'	Stadium: Anfield; Attendance: 52,838; Referee: Anthony Taylor

15 May 2023 36	Leicester City	0–3	Liverpool	Leicester
20:00 BST	Pereira (yellow card) 53'; Thomas (yellow card) 90+1'	Report	Jones 33', 36'; Alexander-Arnold 71'; Konaté (yellow card) 86'	Stadium: King Power Stadium; Attendance: 32,225; Referee: Craig Pawson

20 May 2023 37	Liverpool	1–1	Aston Villa	Liverpool
15:00 BST	Konaté (yellow card) 20'; Alexander-Arnold (yellow card) 66'; Fabinho (yellow card) 80'; Firmino 89'	Report	Watkins (penalty missed) 22'; Ramsey 27'; Mings (yellow card) 45'; Digne (yellow card) 53'; Martínez (yellow card) 77'; Young (yellow card) 90+1'; Konsa (yellow card) 90+6'	Stadium: Anfield; Attendance: 53,306; Referee: John Brooks

28 May 2023 38	Southampton	4–4	Liverpool	Southampton
16:30 BST	Ward-Prowse 19'; Kamaldeen 28', 47'; A. Armstrong 64'	Report	Jota 10', 73'; Firmino 14'; Tsimikas (yellow card) 25'; Elliott (yellow card) 60'; Gakpo 72'	Stadium: St Mary's Stadium; Attendance: 31,129; Referee: Darren England

=== FA Cup ===
The club entered the competition in the third round and were drawn at home to Wolverhampton Wanderers. They were drawn away to Brighton & Hove Albion in the fourth round.

Win Draw Loss Fixtures

7 January 2023 Third round	Liverpool	2–2	Wolverhampton Wanderers	Liverpool
20:00 GMT	Núñez 45'; Salah 52'	Report	Guedes 26'; Jonny (yellow card) 62'; Hwang 66'	Stadium: Anfield; Attendance: 52,636; Referee: Andy Madley

17 January 2023 Third round replay	Wolverhampton Wanderers	0–1	Liverpool	Wolverhampton
19:45 GMT	A. Traoré (yellow card) 43'	Report	Elliott 13'; Thiago (yellow card) 57'; Phillips (yellow card) 71'; Gomez (yellow card) 90+2'	Stadium: Molineux Stadium; Attendance: 30,948; Referee: Andre Marriner

29 January 2023 Fourth round	Brighton & Hove Albion	2–1	Liverpool	Brighton and Hove
13:30 GMT	Dunk 39', (yellow card) 63'; Mitoma 90+2'	Report	Bajcetic (yellow card) 17'; Elliott 30'; Konaté (yellow card) 62'; Fabinho (yellow card) 86'; Robertson (yellow card) 90+1'	Stadium: Falmer Stadium; Attendance: 31,675; Referee: David Coote

=== EFL Cup ===
Liverpool were drawn at home to Derby County in the third round, and then away to Manchester City in the fourth round.

Win Draw Loss Fixtures

9 November 2022 Third round	Liverpool	0–0 (3–2 p)	Derby County	Liverpool
20:00 GMT		Report		Stadium: Anfield; Attendance: 52,608; Referee: Tony Harrington
	Penalties
	Bajcetic (penalty missed); Oxlade-Chamberlain (penalty scored); Firmino (penalty missed); Núñez (penalty scored); Elliott (penalty scored)		(penalty scored) McGoldrick; (penalty missed) Hourihane; (penalty missed) Forsyth; (penalty scored) Sibley; (penalty missed) Dobbin

22 December 2022 Fourth round	Manchester City	3–2	Liverpool	Manchester
20:00 GMT	Haaland 10'; Mahrez 47'; Aké 58'; Rodri (yellow card) 79'	Report	Carvalho 20'; Bajcetic (yellow card) 35'; Salah 48'; Fabinho (yellow card) 79'; Keïta (yellow card) 83'	Stadium: Etihad Stadium; Attendance: 52,423; Referee: David Coote

=== FA Community Shield ===
The traditional season curtain raiser was played between the previous season's league champions and FA Cup winners. As winners of the 2021–22 FA Cup, Liverpool faced 2021–22 Premier League champions Manchester City. Normally played at Wembley Stadium, this season it was played at Leicester City's King Power Stadium to avoid clashes with the UEFA Women's Euro 2022 competition.

30 July 2022 Final	Liverpool	3–1	Manchester City	Leicester
17:00 BST (UTC+1)	Alexander-Arnold 21'; Salah 83' (pen.); Núñez 90+4', (yellow card) 90+5'	Report	Álvarez 70'; Dias (yellow card) 83'	Stadium: King Power Stadium; Attendance: 28,545; Referee: Craig Pawson

=== UEFA Champions League ===
Liverpool entered the competition in the group stage.

==== Group stage ====
The draw for the group stage was held on 25 August 2022, with the fixtures announced two days later.

Pos	Team	Pld	W	D	L	GF	GA	GD	Pts	Qualification	NAP	LIV	AJX	RAN
1	(Italy) Napoli	6	5	0	1	20	6	+14	15 (Note: Tied on head-to-head points. Head-to-head goal difference: Napoli +1, Liverpool −1.)	Advance to knockout phase	—	4–1	4–2	3–0
2	(England) Liverpool	6	5	0	1	17	6	+11	15	Advance to knockout phase	2–0	—	2–1	2–0
3	(Netherlands) Ajax	6	2	0	4	11	16	−5	6	Transfer to Europa League	1–6	0–3	—	4–0
4	(Scotland) Rangers	6	0	0	6	2	22	−20	0		0–3	1–7	1–3	—

Source: UEFA
Rules for classification: Group stage tiebreakers
Notes:

7 September 2022 1	Napoli (Italy)	4–1	Liverpool	Naples, Italy
21:00 CEST	Zieliński 5' (pen.), 47'; Osimhen (penalty missed) 19'; Zambo Anguissa 31'; Simeone 44'; Rrahmani (yellow card) 66'	Report	Milner (yellow card) 10'; Van Dijk (yellow card) 18'; Díaz 49'	Stadium: Stadio Diego Armando Maradona; Attendance: 51,793; Referee: Carlos del Cerro Grande (Spain)

13 September 2022 2	Liverpool	2–1	(Netherlands) Ajax	Liverpool
20:00 BST	Salah 17'; Matip (yellow card) 62', (goal) 89'	Report	Kudus 27'; Álvarez (yellow card) 59'; Berghuis (yellow card) 90+1'	Stadium: Anfield; Attendance: 52,387; Referee: Artur Soares Dias (Portugal)

4 October 2022 3	Liverpool	2–0	(Scotland) Rangers	Liverpool
20:00 BST	Alexander-Arnold 7', (yellow card) 90+2'; Salah 53' (pen.)	Report	Lundstram (yellow card) 38'	Stadium: Anfield; Attendance: 52,485; Referee: Clément Turpin (France)

12 October 2022 4	Rangers (Scotland)	1–7	Liverpool	Glasgow, Scotland
20:00 BST	Arfield 17'	Report	Firmino 24', 55'; Núñez 66'; Salah 76', 80', 81'; Elliott 87'; Gomez (yellow card) 90'	Stadium: Ibrox Stadium; Attendance: 48,820; Referee: Slavko Vinčić (Slovenia)

26 October 2022 5	Ajax (Netherlands)	0–3	Liverpool	Amsterdam, Netherlands
21:00 CEST		Report	Salah 42'; Núñez 49'; Elliott 52'	Stadium: Johan Cruyff Arena; Attendance: 53,327; Referee: José María Sánchez Martínez (Spain)

1 November 2022 6	Liverpool	2–0	(Italy) Napoli	Liverpool
20:00 BST	Konaté (yellow card) 36'; Alexander-Arnold (yellow card) 73'; Salah 85'; Núñez (yellow card) 90+4', (goal) 90+8'	Report		Stadium: Anfield; Attendance: 52,077; Referee: Tobias Stieler (Germany)

==== Knockout phase ====
Liverpool advanced to the knockout phase as group runners-up.

===== Round of 16 =====
The round of 16 draw took place on 7 November, and Liverpool were drawn to Real Madrid, who they last met in the 2022 final.

21 February 2023 First leg	Liverpool	2–5	(Spain) Real Madrid	Liverpool
20:00 GMT	Núñez 4'; Salah 14'; Elliott (yellow card) 90+3'	Report	Vinícius 21', 36', (yellow card) 60'; Militão 47'; Benzema 55', 67'	Stadium: Anfield; Attendance: 52,337; Referee: István Kovács (Romania)

15 March 2023 Second leg	Real Madrid (Spain)	1–0 (6–2 agg.)	Liverpool	Madrid, Spain
21:00 CET	Benzema 78'	Report	Tsimikas (yellow card) 90+4'	Stadium: Santiago Bernabéu; Attendance: 63,127; Referee: Felix Zwayer (Germany)

== Squad statistics ==
=== Appearances ===
Players with no appearances are not included on the list.

No.	Pos.	Nat.	Player	Premier League		FA Cup		EFL Cup		Champions League		Community Shield		Total	
No.	Pos.	Nat.	Player	Apps	Starts	Apps	Starts	Apps	Starts	Apps	Starts	Apps	Starts	Apps	Starts
1	GK	(Brazil)	Alisson	37	37	2	2	0	0	8	8	0	0	47	47
2	DF	(England)	Joe Gomez	21	15	3	2	2	2	5	4	0	0	31	23
3	MF	(Brazil)	Fabinho	36	31	3	1	1	0	8	7	1	1	49	40
4	DF	(Netherlands)	Virgil van Dijk	32	32	0	0	0	0	8	8	1	1	41	41
5	DF	(France)	Ibrahima Konaté	18	17	3	3	0	0	3	3	0	0	24	23
6	MF	(Spain)	Thiago	18	14	3	3	1	1	5	3	1	1	28	22
7	MF	(England)	James Milner	31	7	2	1	1	1	8	3	1	0	43	12
8	MF	(Guinea)	Naby Keïta	8	3	3	2	1	0	0	0	1	0	13	5
9	FW	(Brazil)	Roberto Firmino	25	13	0	0	1	0	8	4	1	1	35	18
11	FW	(Egypt)	Mohamed Salah	38	37	3	2	1	1	8	7	1	1	51	48
13	GK	(Spain)	Adrián	0	0	0	0	0	0	0	0	1	1	1	1
14	MF	(England)	Jordan Henderson	35	23	2	1	1	0	4	4	1	1	43	29
15	MF	(England)	Alex Oxlade-Chamberlain	9	4	1	0	2	1	1	0	0	0	13	5
17	MF	(England)	Curtis Jones	18	12	2	0	0	0	2	1	1	0	23	13
18	FW	(Netherlands)	Cody Gakpo	21	17	3	3	0	0	2	2	0	0	26	22
19	MF	(England)	Harvey Elliott	32	18	3	2	2	1	8	4	1	0	46	25
20	FW	(Portugal)	Diogo Jota	22	12	0	0	0	0	6	3	0	0	28	15
21	DF	(Greece)	Kostas Tsimikas	20	9	1	1	1	1	6	4	0	0	28	15
22	DF	(Scotland)	Calvin Ramsay	0	0	0	0	1	1	1	0	0	0	2	1
23	FW	(Colombia)	Luis Díaz	17	11	0	0	0	0	3	3	1	1	21	15
26	DF	(Scotland)	Andy Robertson	34	29	2	2	1	1	5	4	1	1	43	37
27	FW	(Uruguay)	Darwin Núñez	29	19	2	1	2	1	8	5	1	0	42	26
28	FW	(Portugal)	Fabio Carvalho	13	4	1	1	2	2	4	1	1	0	21	8
29	MF	(Brazil)	Arthur	0	0	0	0	0	0	1	0	0	0	1	0
32	DF	(Cameroon)	Joël Matip	14	12	1	1	1	1	4	2	1	1	21	17
42	MF	(England)	Bobby Clark	1	0	0	0	1	1	0	0	0	0	2	1
43	MF	(Spain)	Stefan Bajcetic	11	6	2	2	2	2	4	1	0	0	19	11
47	DF	(England)	Nat Phillips	2	1	1	0	2	1	0	0	0	0	5	2
50	FW	(Scotland)	Ben Gannon-Doak	2	0	2	0	1	0	0	0	0	0	5	0
62	GK	(Republic of Ireland)	Caoimhín Kelleher	1	1	1	1	2	2	0	0	0	0	4	4
66	DF	(England)	Trent Alexander-Arnold	37	34	2	2	0	0	7	7	1	1	47	44
81	FW	(England)	Layton Stewart	0	0	0	0	1	1	0	0	0	0	1	1
94	MF	(Germany)	Melkamu Frauendorf	0	0	0	0	1	1	0	0	0	0	1	1
Total				38		3		2		8		1		52	

=== Goals ===
Rank	Pos.	No.	Player	Premier League	FA Cup	EFL Cup	Champions League	Community Shield	Total
1	FW	11	(Egypt) Mohamed Salah	19	1	1	8	1	30
2	FW	27	(Uruguay) Darwin Núñez	9	1	0	4	1	15
3	FW	9	(Brazil) Roberto Firmino	11	0	0	2	0	13
4	FW	18	(Netherlands) Cody Gakpo	7	0	0	0	0	7
4	FW	20	(Portugal) Diogo Jota	7	0	0	0	0	7
6	MF	19	(England) Harvey Elliott	1	2	0	2	0	5
6	FW	23	(Colombia) Luis Díaz	4	0	0	1	0	5
8	DF	66	(England) Trent Alexander-Arnold	2	0	0	1	1	4
9	DF	4	(Netherlands) Virgil van Dijk	3	0	0	0	0	3
9	MF	17	(England) Curtis Jones	3	0	0	0	0	3
9	FW	28	(Portugal) Fábio Carvalho	2	0	1	0	0	3
12	DF	32	(Cameroon) Joël Matip	1	0	0	1	0	2
13	MF	15	(England) Alex Oxlade-Chamberlain	1	0	0	0	0	1
13	MF	43	(Spain) Stefan Bajcetic	1	0	0	0	0	1
Own goals				4	0	0	0	0	4
Total				75	4	2	19	3	103

=== Clean sheets ===
No.	Player	Premier League	FA Cup	EFL Cup	Champions League	Community Shield	Total
1	(Brazil) Alisson Becker	14	0	0	3	0	17
62	(Republic of Ireland) Caoimhín Kelleher	0	1	1	0	0	2
Total		14	1	1	3	0	19

=== Disciplinary record ===
No.	Pos.	Player	Premier League			FA Cup			EFL Cup			Champions League			Community Shield			Total		
No.	Pos.	Player	Yellow card	(yellow card) (yellow-red card)	Red card	Yellow card	(yellow card) (yellow-red card)	Red card	Yellow card	(yellow card) (yellow-red card)	Red card	Yellow card	(yellow card) (yellow-red card)	Red card	Yellow card	(yellow card) (yellow-red card)	Red card	Yellow card	(yellow card) (yellow-red card)	Red card
1	GK	(Brazil) Alisson Becker	1	0	0	0	0	0	0	0	0	0	0	0	0	0	0	1	0	0
2	DF	(England) Joe Gomez	3	0	0	1	0	0	0	0	0	0	0	0	0	0	0	4	0	0
3	MF	(Brazil) Fabinho	11	0	0	1	0	0	0	0	0	0	0	0	0	0	0	12	0	0
4	DF	(Netherlands) Virgil van Dijk	3	0	0	0	0	0	0	0	0	1	0	0	0	0	0	4	0	0
5	DF	(France) Ibrahima Konaté	5	0	0	1	0	0	0	0	0	1	0	0	0	0	0	7	0	0
6	MF	(Spain) Thiago Alcântara	2	0	0	1	0	0	0	0	0	0	0	0	0	0	0	3	0	0
7	MF	(England) James Milner	2	0	0	0	0	0	0	0	0	1	0	0	0	0	0	3	0	0
8	MF	(Guinea) Naby Keïta	1	0	0	0	0	0	0	0	0	0	0	0	0	0	0	1	0	0
11	FW	(Egypt) Mohamed Salah	2	0	0	0	0	0	0	0	0	0	0	0	0	0	0	2	0	0
14	MF	(England) Jordan Henderson	2	0	0	0	0	0	0	0	0	0	0	0	0	0	0	2	0	0
17	MF	(England) Curtis Jones	2	0	0	0	0	0	0	0	0	0	0	0	0	0	0	2	0	0
19	MF	(England) Harvey Elliott	2	0	0	0	0	0	0	0	0	1	0	0	0	0	0	3	0	0
20	FW	(Portugal) Diogo Jota	2	0	0	0	0	0	0	0	0	0	0	0	0	0	0	2	0	0
21	DF	(Greece) Kostas Tsimikas	3	0	0	0	0	0	0	0	0	1	0	0	0	0	0	4	0	0
23	FW	(Colombia) Luis Díaz	2	0	0	0	0	0	0	0	0	0	0	0	0	0	0	2	0	0
26	DF	(Scotland) Andy Robertson	3	0	0	1	0	0	0	0	0	0	0	0	0	0	0	4	0	0
27	FW	(Uruguay) Darwin Núñez	1	0	1	0	0	0	0	0	0	1	0	0	1	0	0	3	0	1
32	DF	(Cameroon) Joël Matip	3	0	0	0	0	0	0	0	0	1	0	0	0	0	0	4	0	0
43	MF	(Spain) Stefan Bajcetic	2	0	0	1	0	0	0	0	0	0	0	0	0	0	0	3	0	0
47	DF	(England) Nat Phillips	0	0	0	1	0	0	0	0	0	0	0	0	0	0	0	1	0	0
66	DF	(England) Trent Alexander-Arnold	5	0	0	0	0	0	0	0	0	2	0	0	0	0	0	7	0	0
Total			55	0	1	7	0	0	0	0	0	10	0	0	1	0	0	74	0	1

== Club awards ==
=== Player of the Month award ===
Awarded monthly to the player that was chosen by fans voting on liverpoolfc.com

Month	Player	Ref.
August/September	(England) Harvey Elliott	
October	(Brazil) Alisson Becker	
November	(Uruguay) Darwin Núñez	
December	(Egypt) Mohamed Salah	
January	(Spain) Stefan Bajcetic	
February	(Uruguay) Darwin Núñez	
March	(Egypt) Mohamed Salah	
April	(England) Trent Alexander-Arnold	

=== Player of the Season award ===
Alisson Becker won the Player of the Season award.
