= 2023–24 Liverpool F.C. season =

English football club season

Liverpool
2023–24 season
- Owner: Fenway Sports Group
- Chairman: Tom Werner
- Manager: Jürgen Klopp
- Stadium: Anfield
- Premier League: 3rd
- FA Cup: Quarter-finals
- EFL Cup: Winners
- UEFA Europa League: Quarter-finals
- Top goalscorer: League: Mohamed Salah (18); All: Mohamed Salah (25)
- Highest home attendance: 60,090 (v. Crystal Palace, 14 April 2024)
- Lowest home attendance: 49,338 (v. Toulouse, 26 October 2023)
- Average home league attendance: 55,809
- Biggest win: 6–1 v. Sparta Prague (H) UEFA Europa League, 14 March 2024
- Biggest defeat: 0–3 v. Atalanta (H) UEFA Europa League, 11 April 2024
Home colours	Away colours	Third colours

The 2023–24 season was Liverpool Football Club's 132nd season in existence and their 62nd consecutive season in the top flight of English football. In addition to the Premier League, they participated in the FA Cup, EFL Cup and the UEFA Europa League, having failed to qualify for the UEFA Champions League in the previous season.

Virgil van Dijk was appointed the new club captain after the departure of Jordan Henderson. The Dutchman also became Liverpool's second non-British or Irish captain after Sami Hyypiä, who was appointed in the 2001–02 season. Trent Alexander-Arnold also replaced James Milner as vice-captain. The season saw a rebuild in midfield as the club signed Alexis Mac Allister, Dominik Szoboszlai, Wataru Endo and, on transfer deadline day, Ryan Gravenberch.

This season was the first since 2010–11 without Jordan Henderson, the first since 2014–15 without James Milner and Roberto Firmino, the first since 2016–17 without Alex Oxlade-Chamberlain, and the first since 2017–18 without Naby Keïta and Fabinho.

This was also Liverpool's final season under Jürgen Klopp, who announced his departure at the season's end on 26 January 2024. On 25 February 2024, Liverpool beat Chelsea 1–0 in the EFL Cup final, with Virgil van Dijk scoring the winner in the 118th minute to win the club's tenth League Cup and second under Klopp. It proved to be Liverpool's final trophy under Klopp; despite being in contention to win four trophies, a bad run of form in the league saw them ruled out of the title race, and they were knocked out of both the FA Cup and UEFA Europa League in the quarter-finals by the eventual winners of their respective competitions, Manchester United and Atalanta.

== First-team squad ==
No.	Player	Nationality	Date of birth (age)	Signed from	Apps	Goals	Assists
Goalkeepers
1	Alisson Becker	(Brazil)	2 October 1992 (aged 31)	(Italy) Roma	263	1	3
13	Adrián	(Spain)	3 January 1987 (aged 37)	(England) West Ham United	26	0	0
62	Caoimhín Kelleher	(Republic of Ireland)	23 November 1998 (aged 25)	(England) LFC Academy	47	0	0
Defenders
2	Joe Gomez	(England)	23 May 1997 (aged 27)	(England) Charlton Athletic	225	0	9
4	Virgil van Dijk (captain)	(Netherlands)	8 July 1991 (aged 32)	(England) Southampton	270	23	10
5	Ibrahima Konaté	(France)	25 May 1999 (aged 25)	(Germany) RB Leipzig	90	3	2
21	Kostas Tsimikas	(Greece)	12 May 1996 (aged 28)	(Greece) Olympiacos	86	0	16
26	Andy Robertson	(Scotland)	11 March 1994 (aged 30)	(England) Hull City	297	11	65
32	Joël Matip	(Cameroon)	8 August 1991 (aged 32)	(Germany) Schalke 04	201	11	6
46	Rhys Williams	(England)	3 February 2001 (aged 23)	(England) LFC Academy	19	0	0
66	Trent Alexander-Arnold (vice-captain)	(England)	7 October 1998 (aged 25)	(England) LFC Academy	310	19	79
78	Jarell Quansah	(England)	29 January 2003 (aged 21)	(England) LFC Academy	33	3	3
84	Conor Bradley	(Northern Ireland)	9 July 2003 (aged 20)	(England) LFC Academy	28	1	7
Midfielders
3	Wataru Endo	(Japan)	9 February 1993 (aged 31)	(Germany) VfB Stuttgart	43	2	1
6	Thiago	(Spain)	11 April 1991 (aged 33)	(Germany) Bayern Munich	98	3	6
8	Dominik Szoboszlai	(Hungary)	25 October 2000 (aged 23)	(Germany) RB Leipzig	45	7	4
10	Alexis Mac Allister	(Argentina)	24 December 1998 (aged 25)	(England) Brighton & Hove Albion	46	7	7
17	Curtis Jones	(England)	30 January 2001 (aged 23)	(England) LFC Academy	133	16	13
19	Harvey Elliott	(England)	4 April 2003 (aged 21)	(England) Fulham	119	10	14
38	Ryan Gravenberch	(Netherlands)	16 May 2002 (aged 22)	(Germany) Bayern Munich	38	4	2
43	Stefan Bajcetic	(Spain)	22 October 2004 (aged 19)	(England) LFC Academy	22	1	0
Forwards
7	Luis Díaz	(Colombia)	13 January 1997 (aged 27)	(Portugal) Porto	98	24	10
9	Darwin Núñez	(Uruguay)	24 June 1999 (aged 25)	(Portugal) Benfica	96	33	17
11	Mohamed Salah	(Egypt)	15 June 1992 (aged 32)	(Italy) Roma	349	211	88
18	Cody Gakpo	(Netherlands)	7 May 1999 (aged 25)	(Netherlands) PSV	79	23	8
20	Diogo Jota	(Portugal)	4 December 1996 (aged 27)	(England) Wolverhampton Wanderers	145	56	19
50	Ben Gannon-Doak	(Scotland)	11 November 2005 (aged 18)	(Scotland) Celtic	10	0	0

=== New contracts ===
Date	Pos.	No.	Player	Ref.
30 June 2023	GK	13	(Spain) Adrián	
19 September 2023	FW	50	(Scotland) Ben Gannon-Doak	
25 September 2023	DF	21	(Greece) Kostas Tsimikas	
31 October 2023	FW	51	(Republic of Ireland) Trent Koné-Doherty	
1 December 2023	DF	84	(Northern Ireland) Conor Bradley	
21 December 2023	MF	42	(England) Bobby Clark	
5 January 2024	GK	45	(Brazil) Marcelo Pitaluga	
9 January 2024	GK	56	(Czech Republic) Vítězslav Jaroš	
19 January 2024	MF	53	(England) James McConnell	
15 March 2024	FW	76	(England) Jayden Danns	
9 April 2024	DF	48	(England) Calum Scanlon	
1 May 2024	DF	57	(England) Carter Pinnington	

== Transfers ==
The summer transfer window was open between 14 June and 1 September 2023. The winter transfer window opened on 1 January 2024 and closed on 1 February 2024.

=== In ===
Date	Pos.	No.	Player	Transferred from	Fee	Ref.
1 July 2023	MF	10	(Argentina) Alexis Mac Allister	(England) Brighton & Hove Albion	£35,000,000	
2 July 2023	MF	8	(Hungary) Dominik Szoboszlai	(Germany) RB Leipzig	£60,000,000	
18 August 2023	MF	3	(Japan) Wataru Endo	(Germany) VfB Stuttgart	£16,200,000	
1 September 2023	MF	38	(Netherlands) Ryan Gravenberch	(Germany) Bayern Munich	£34,200,000	
▼ Spending: £145,400,000

=== Out ===
Date	Pos.	No.	Player	To club	Fee	Ref.
1 July 2023	MF	7	(England) James Milner	(England) Brighton & Hove Albion	Free transfer	
1 July 2023	MF	8	(Guinea) Naby Keïta	(Germany) Werder Bremen	Free transfer	
1 July 2023	FW	9	(Brazil) Roberto Firmino	(Saudi Arabia) Al Ahli	Free transfer	
1 July 2023	MF	15	(England) Alex Oxlade-Chamberlain	(Turkey) Beşiktaş	Free transfer	
1 July 2023	GK	54	(Northern Ireland) Liam Hughes	(Finland) FC Haka	Free transfer	
1 July 2023	MF	65	(England) Leighton Clarkson	(Scotland) Aberdeen	Undisclosed	
1 July 2023	MF	68	(England) Jack Bearne	(Scotland) Greenock Morton	Free transfer	
22 July 2023	FW	81	(England) Layton Stewart	(England) Preston North End	Undisclosed	
27 July 2023	MF	14	(England) Jordan Henderson	(Saudi Arabia) Al-Ettifaq	£12,000,000	
31 July 2023	MF	3	(Brazil) Fabinho	(Saudi Arabia) Al-Ittihad	£40,000,000	
3 August 2023	FW	82	(England) Max Woltman	(England) Oxford United	Undisclosed	
12 January 2024	FW	55	(Germany) Paul Glatzel	(England) Swindon Town	Undisclosed	
▲ Profit: £52,000,000

=== Loans out ===
Start date	End date	Pos.	No.	Player	To club	Fee	Ref.
1 July 2023	15 January 2024 (Note: On 15 January, Ramsay was recalled from his season-long loan at Preston. He was subsequently loaned to Bolton Wanderers.)	DF	22	(Scotland) Calvin Ramsay	(England) Preston North End	None	
1 July 2023	1 January 2024 (Note: On 1 January, Carvalho was recalled from his season-long loan at RB Leipzig. He was subsequently loaned to Hull.)	MF	28	(Portugal) Fábio Carvalho	(Germany) RB Leipzig	None	
1 July 2023	3 January 2024 (Note: On 3 January, Williams was recalled from his season-long loan at Aberdeen. He was subsequently loaned to Port Vale.)	DF	46	(England) Rhys Williams	(Scotland) Aberdeen	None	
1 July 2023	End of season	GK	95	(England) Harvey Davies	(England) Crewe Alexandra	None	
3 July 2023	1 January 2024 (Note: On 1 January, Beck was recalled from his season-long loan at Dundee. He was subsequently loaned to Dundee again.)	DF	63	(Wales) Owen Beck	(Scotland) Dundee	None	
13 July 2023	End of season	DF	72	(Netherlands) Sepp van den Berg	(Germany) Mainz 05	None	
18 July 2023	January 2024 (Note: On 26 January, Arroyo was recalled from his season-long loan at FC Andorra. He was subsequently loaned to Burgos.)	DF	—	(Colombia) Anderson Arroyo	(Spain) FC Andorra	None	
19 July 2023	4 January 2024 (Note: On 4 January, Balagizi was recalled from his season-long loan at Wigan. He was subsequently loaned to Kilmarnock.)	MF	85	(England) James Balagizi	(England) Wigan Athletic	None	
20 July 2023	End of season	MF	79	(England) Dominic Corness	(Switzerland) Yverdon Sport	None	
28 July 2023	End of season	DF	—	(England) Adam Lewis	(England) Newport County	None	
8 August 2023	End of season	GK	75	(Poland) Jakub Ojrzyński	(Netherlands) Den Bosch	None	
18 August 2023	End of season (Note: On 15 January, Hewitson's loan at Stalybridge was extended until the end of season.)	GK	73	(England) Luke Hewitson	(England) Stalybridge Celtic	None	
29 August 2023	16 January 2024 (Note: On 16 January, Koumetio was recalled from his season-long loan at Dunkerque. He was subsequently loaned to Blackburn Rovers.)	DF	89	(France) Billy Koumetio	(France) USL Dunkerque	None	
31 August 2023	January 2024	DF	47	(England) Nat Phillips	(Scotland) Celtic	None	
1 September 2023	End of season	DF	77	(England) James Norris	(England) Tranmere Rovers	None	
1 September 2023	End of season	MF	91	(England) Luca Stephenson	(England) Barrow	None	
1 September 2023	End of season	MF	80	(England) Tyler Morton	(England) Hull City	None	
5 January 2024	30 November 2024	GK	45	(Brazil) Marcelo Pitaluga	(Republic of Ireland) St Patrick's Athletic	None	
10 January 2024	End of season	MF	28	(Portugal) Fábio Carvalho	(England) Hull City	None	
10 January 2024	End of season	GK	56	(Czech Republic) Vítězslav Jaroš	(Austria) Sturm Graz	None	
11 January 2024	End of season	DF	44	(England) Luke Chambers	(England) Wigan Athletic	None	
16 January 2024	1 February 2024 (Note: On 1 February, Williams returned from his loan spell at Port Vale due to injury.)	DF	46	(England) Rhys Williams	(England) Port Vale	None	
24 January 2024	End of season	MF	85	(England) James Balagizi	(Scotland) Kilmarnock	None	
26 January 2024	End of season	DF	—	(Colombia) Anderson Arroyo	(Spain) Burgos	None	
29 January 2024	End of season	DF	22	(Scotland) Calvin Ramsay	(England) Bolton Wanderers	None	
30 January 2024	End of season	DF	63	(Wales) Owen Beck	(Scotland) Dundee	None	
30 January 2024	End of season	DF	47	(England) Nat Phillips	(Wales) Cardiff City	None	
1 February 2024	End of season	DF	89	(France) Billy Koumetio	(England) Blackburn Rovers	None	

=== Transfer summary ===
Spending

Summer: ▼£ 145,400,000

Winter: £ 0

Total: ▼£ 145,400,000

Income

Summer: ▲£ 52,000,000

Winter: £ 0

Total: ▲£ 52,000,000

Net Expenditure

Summer: ▼£ 93,400,000

Winter: £ 0

Total: ▼£ 93,400,000

== Pre-season and friendlies ==
Win Draw Loss

19 July 2023 Friendly	Karlsruher SC	2–4	Liverpool	Karlsruhe, Germany
18:30 CEST	Stindl 38'; Jung 50'; Gondorf (yellow card) 62'	Report	Núñez 3'; Gakpo 69'; Jota 90+2', 90+3'	Stadium: Wildparkstadion; Attendance: 34,000; Referee: Lars Erbst (Germany)

24 July 2023 Friendly	Greuther Fürth	4–4	Liverpool	Villingen-Schwenningen, Germany
13:15 CEST	Green 47'; Petkov 67'; Sieb 74', 77'	Report	Díaz 22'; Tsimikas (yellow card) 48'; Núñez 50', 59'; Scanlon (yellow card) 80'; Salah 89'	Stadium: MS-Technologie-Arena; Attendance: 0 Referee: Martin Wilke (Germany)

30 July 2023 Singapore Trophy	Liverpool	4–0	Leicester City	Kallang, Singapore
17:00 SGT	Núñez 30'; Clark 35'; Jota 38'; Gannon-Doak 64'	Report	Castagne (yellow card) 66'	Stadium: Singapore National Stadium; Attendance: 28,597; Referee: Farhad Bin Mohamed (Singapore)

2 August 2023 Singapore Trophy	Liverpool	3–4	Bayern Munich	Kallang, Singapore
19:30 SGT	Gakpo 2', (yellow card) 56'; Van Dijk 28'; Alexander-Arnold (yellow card) 58'; Díaz 66'	Report	Gnabry 33'; Sané 42'; Stanišić 80'; Krätzig 90+1'	Stadium: Singapore National Stadium; Attendance: 49,983; Referee: Ahmad A'Qashah (Singapore)

7 August 2023 Friendly	Liverpool	3–1	Darmstadt 98	Preston, England
19:00 BST	Salah 5'; Jota 8'; Szoboszlai (yellow card) 41'; Díaz 59'	Report	Honsak 10'	Stadium: Deepdale; Attendance: 19,000; Referee: Thomas Bramall (England)

== Competitions ==
=== Overall record ===
Competition	First match	Last match	Starting round	Final position	Record							
Competition	First match	Last match	Starting round	Final position	Pld	W	D	L	GF	GA	GD	Win %
Premier League	13 August 2023	19 May 2024	Matchday 1	3rd	38	24	10	4	86	41	+45	63.16
FA Cup	7 January 2024	17 March 2024	Third round	Quarter-finals	4	3	0	1	13	6	+7	75.00
EFL Cup	27 September 2023	25 February 2024	Third round	Winners	6	5	1	0	14	5	+9	83.33
UEFA Europa League	21 September 2023	18 April 2024	Group stage	Quarter-finals	10	7	0	3	29	12	+17	70.00
Total					58	39	11	8	142	64	+78	67.24

Source: Soccerway

=== Premier League ===
==== League table ====
Pos	Team	Pld	W	D	L	GF	GA	GD	Pts	Qualification or relegation
1	Manchester City (C)	38	28	7	3	96	34	+62	91	Qualification for the Champions League league phase
2	Arsenal	38	28	5	5	91	29	+62	89	Qualification for the Champions League league phase
3	Liverpool	38	24	10	4	86	41	+45	82	Qualification for the Champions League league phase
4	Aston Villa	38	20	8	10	76	61	+15	68	Qualification for the Champions League league phase
5	Tottenham Hotspur	38	20	6	12	74	61	+13	66	Qualification for the Europa League league phase

Source: Premier League
Rules for classification: 1) Points; 2) Goal difference; 3) Goals scored; 4) If the champions, relegated teams or qualified teams for UEFA competitions cannot be determined by rules 1 to 3, rules 4.1 to 4.3 are applied – 4.1) Points gained in head-to-head record between such teams; 4.2) Away goals scored in head-to-head record between such teams; 4.3) Play-offs
(C) Champions

==== Results summary ====
Overall								Home						Away					
Pld	W	D	L	GF	GA	GD	Pts	W	D	L	GF	GA	GD	W	D	L	GF	GA	GD
38	24	10	4	86	41	+45	82	15	3	1	49	17	+32	9	7	3	37	24	+13

Source: Soccerway

==== Results by round ====
Round	1	2	3	4	5	6	7	8	9	10	11	12	13	14	15	16	17	18	19	20	21	22	23	24	25	26	27	28	30	31	32	33	34	29^{1}	35	36	37	38
Ground	A	H	A	H	A	H	A	A	H	H	A	H	A	H	A	A	H	H	A	H	A	H	A	H	A	H	A	H	H	H	A	H	A	A	A	H	A	H
Result	D	W	W	W	W	W	L	D	W	W	D	W	D	W	W	W	D	D	W	W	W	W	L	W	W	W	W	D	W	W	D	L	W	L	D	W	D	W
Position	12	5	4	3	3	2	4	4	4	4	3	2	3	2	2	1	2	2	1	1	1	1	1	1	1	1	1	2	1	1	2	3	2	3	3	3	3	3
Points	1	4	7	10	13	16	16	17	20	23	24	27	28	31	34	37	38	39	42	45	48	51	51	54	57	60	63	64	67	70	70	71	74	74	75	78	79	82

Source: Premier League
A = Away; H = Home; W = Win; D = Draw; L = Loss; P = Postponed
Notes:
^{1} Matchday 29 (vs. Everton) was moved due to Liverpool's fixtures in the FA Cup quarter-finals.

==== Matches ====
The Premier League fixtures were released on 15 June 2023.

Win Draw Loss Fixtures

13 August 2023 1	Chelsea	1–1	Liverpool	Fulham
16:30 BST	Chukwuemeka (yellow card) 4'; Fernández (yellow card) 32'; Disasi 37'; Jackson (yellow card) 85'	Report	Díaz 18'; Jota (yellow card) 32'; Alexander-Arnold (yellow card) 68'; Mac Allister (yellow card) 89'	Stadium: Stamford Bridge; Attendance: 40,096; Referee: Anthony Taylor

19 August 2023 2	Liverpool	3–1	Bournemouth	Liverpool
15:00 BST	Alisson (yellow card) 9'; Díaz 28'; Salah (penalty missed) 36', 36'; Mac Allister (red card) 58'; Jota 62'	Report	Semenyo 3', (yellow card) 16'; Anthony (yellow card) 26'; Neto (yellow card) 35'	Stadium: Anfield; Attendance: 49,699; Referee: Thomas Bramall
Note: Alexis Mac Allister's red card was rescinded after the match.

27 August 2023 3	Newcastle United	1–2	Liverpool	Newcastle upon Tyne
16:30 BST	Gordon 25'; Trippier (yellow card) 51'	Report	Alexander-Arnold (yellow card) 6'; Van Dijk (red card) 28'; Núñez 81', 90+3', (yellow card) 85'	Stadium: St James' Park; Attendance: 52,214; Referee: John Brooks

3 September 2023 4	Liverpool	3–0	Aston Villa	Liverpool
14:00 BST	Szoboszlai 3'; Cash 22' (o.g.); Salah 55'	Report	Kamara (yellow card) 26'	Stadium: Anfield; Attendance: 50,109; Referee: Simon Hooper

16 September 2023 5	Wolverhampton Wanderers	1–3	Liverpool	Wolverhampton
12:30 BST	Hwang Hee-chan 7'; Semedo (yellow card) 71'	Report	Mac Allister (yellow card) 4'; Gakpo 55'; Robertson 85'; H. Bueno 90+1' (o.g.); Elliott (yellow card) 90+2'; Jones (yellow card) 90+2'	Stadium: Molineux Stadium; Attendance: 31,257; Referee: Michael Oliver

24 September 2023 6	Liverpool	3–1	West Ham United	Liverpool
14:00 BST	Salah 16' (pen.); Núñez 60'; Jota 85'	Report	Álvarez (yellow card) 36'; Bowen 42'; Zouma (yellow card) 82'	Stadium: Anfield; Attendance: 50,136; Referee: Chris Kavanagh

30 September 2023 7	Tottenham Hotspur	2–1	Liverpool	Tottenham
17:30 BST	Son Heung-min 36'; Udogie (yellow card) 45+3'; Bissouma (yellow card) 88'; Romero (yellow card) 89'; Matip 90+6' (o.g.); Porro (yellow card) 90+7'; Véliz (yellow card) 90+8'	Report	Jones (red card) 26'; Mac Allister (yellow card) 40'; Gakpo 45+4'; Salah (yellow card) 65'; Jota (yellow card) 68' (yellow-red card) 69'; Robertson (yellow card) 87'; Van Dijk (yellow card) 90+5'	Stadium: Tottenham Hotspur Stadium; Attendance: 62,001; Referee: Simon Hooper

8 October 2023 8	Brighton & Hove Albion	2–2	Liverpool	Brighton and Hove
14:00 BST	Adingra 20'; Dunk 78'; Baleba (yellow card) 90+4'	Report	Salah 40', 45+1' (pen.); Szoboszlai (yellow card) 67'; Gomez (yellow card) 86'	Stadium: Falmer Stadium; Attendance: 31,752; Referee: Anthony Taylor

21 October 2023 9	Liverpool	2–0	Everton	Liverpool
12:30 BST	Konaté (yellow card) 50'; Salah 75' (pen.), 90+7'	Report	Young (yellow card) 18' (yellow-red card) 37'; Tarkowski (yellow card) 32'	Stadium: Anfield; Attendance: 50,201; Referee: Craig Pawson

29 October 2023 10	Liverpool	3–0	Nottingham Forest	Liverpool
14:00 GMT	Alexander-Arnold (yellow card) 19'; Jota 31'; Núñez 35'; Mac Allister (yellow card) 58'; Salah 77'	Report	Mangala (yellow card) 33'; Domínguez (yellow card) 52'; Sangaré (yellow card) 90'	Stadium: Anfield; Attendance: 50,143; Referee: Chris Kavanagh

5 November 2023 11	Luton Town	1–1	Liverpool	Luton
16:30 GMT	Nakamba (yellow card) 44'; Chong 80'	Report	Mac Allister (yellow card) 54'; Díaz 90+5'	Stadium: Kenilworth Road; Attendance: 11,049; Referee: Andy Madley

12 November 2023 12	Liverpool	3–0	Brentford	Liverpool
14:00 GMT	Matip (yellow card) 37'; Salah 39', 62'; Jota 74'	Report	Nørgaard (yellow card) 30'; Ajer (yellow card) 30'	Stadium: Anfield; Attendance: 50,151; Referee: Paul Tierney

25 November 2023 13	Manchester City	1–1	Liverpool	Manchester
12:30 GMT	Haaland 27'; Silva (yellow card) 89'	Report	Núñez (yellow card) 75'; Alexander-Arnold 80'; Matip (yellow card) 86'; Endo (yellow card) 90+3'	Stadium: Etihad Stadium; Attendance: 53,289; Referee: Chris Kavanagh

3 December 2023 14	Liverpool	4–3	Fulham	Liverpool
14:00 GMT	Leno 20' (o.g.); Mac Allister 38'; Endo 87'; Alexander-Arnold 88'	Report	Wilson 24'; Tete 45+3'; De Cordova-Reid 80'	Stadium: Anfield; Attendance: 50,143; Referee: Stuart Attwell

6 December 2023 15	Sheffield United	0–2	Liverpool	Sheffield
19:30 GMT	Norwood (yellow card) 90'; Bogle (yellow card) 90+6'	Report	Endo (yellow card) 34'; Van Dijk 37'; Konaté (yellow card) 62'; Núñez (yellow card) 84'; Szoboszlai 90+4'	Stadium: Bramall Lane; Attendance: 31,406; Referee: Simon Hooper

9 December 2023 16	Crystal Palace	1–2	Liverpool	Selhurst
12:30 GMT	Ward (yellow card) 37'; Mateta 57' (pen.); Ayew (yellow card) 60' (yellow-red card) 75'; Lerma (yellow card) 64'; Richards (yellow card) 71'; Andersen (yellow card) 90+8'; Ahamada (yellow card) 90+12'	Report	Salah 76'; Elliott 90+1'; Gomez (yellow card) 90+9'; Díaz (yellow card) 90+10'	Stadium: Selhurst Park; Attendance: 25,103; Referee: Andy Madley

17 December 2023 17	Liverpool	0–0	Manchester United	Liverpool
16:30 GMT	Núñez (yellow card) 21'; Endo (yellow card) 45+2'	Report	Mainoo (yellow card) 27'; Amrabat (yellow card) 35'; Shaw (yellow card) 88'; Rashford (yellow card) 90+1'; Dalot (yellow card) 90+4' (yellow-red card) 90+4'	Stadium: Anfield; Attendance: 57,158; Referee: Michael Oliver

23 December 2023 18	Liverpool	1–1	Arsenal	Liverpool
17:30 GMT	Salah 29', (yellow card) 84'; Endo (yellow card) 45+3'	Report	Gabriel 4'; Saka (yellow card) 38'; Havertz (yellow card) 45+4'; Rice (yellow card) 49'; Nketiah (yellow card) 86'; White (yellow card) 90+1'	Stadium: Anfield; Attendance: 57,548; Referee: Chris Kavanagh

26 December 2023 19	Burnley	0–2	Liverpool	Burnley
17:30 GMT	Berge (yellow card) 22'; O'Shea (yellow card) 90+1'	Report	Núñez 6'; Alexander-Arnold (yellow card) 77'; Jota 90'	Stadium: Turf Moor; Attendance: 21,624; Referee: Paul Tierney

1 January 2024 20	Liverpool	4–2	Newcastle United	Liverpool
20:00 GMT	Salah (penalty missed) 22', 49', 86' (pen.); Díaz (yellow card) 45'; Alexander-Arnold (yellow card) 45+5'; Endo (yellow card) 66'; Jones 74'; Gakpo 78'	Report	Guimarães (yellow card) 28'; Miley (yellow card) 45+2'; Isak 54'; Joelinton (yellow card) 66'; Botman 81'; Dúbravka (yellow card) 84'; Longstaff (yellow card) 89'	Stadium: Anfield; Attendance: 57,471; Referee: Anthony Taylor

21 January 2024 21	Bournemouth	0–4	Liverpool	Bournemouth
16:30 GMT	Cook (yellow card) 59'	Report	Núñez 49', 90+3', (yellow card) 90+7'; Bradley (yellow card) 66'; Jota 70', 79'	Stadium: Dean Court; Attendance: 11,228; Referee: Andy Madley

31 January 2024 22	Liverpool	4–1	Chelsea	Liverpool
20:15 GMT	Jota 23'; Bradley 39'; Núñez (penalty missed) 45+2', (yellow card) 47'; Szoboszlai 65'; Konaté (yellow card) 76'; Díaz 79'	Report	Caicedo (yellow card) 11'; Fernández (yellow card) 33'; Chilwell (yellow card) 35'; Disasi (yellow card) 41'; Nkunku 71'	Stadium: Anfield; Attendance: 57,524; Referee: Paul Tierney

4 February 2024 23	Arsenal	3–1	Liverpool	Holloway
16:30 GMT	Saka 14'; White (yellow card) 31'; Gabriel (yellow card) 57'; Martinelli 67'; Kiwior (yellow card) 69'; Saliba (yellow card) 90+1'; Trossard 90+2'; Rice (yellow card) 90+4'; Havertz (yellow card) 90+5'	Report	Gomez (yellow card) 25'; Gabriel 45+3' (o.g.); Konaté (yellow card) 55' (yellow-red card) 88'; Núñez (yellow card) 90'	Stadium: Emirates Stadium; Attendance: 60,374; Referee: Anthony Taylor

10 February 2024 24	Liverpool	3–1	Burnley	Liverpool
15:00 GMT	Quansah (yellow card) 19'; Jota 31'; Endo (yellow card) 33'; Díaz 52'; Núñez (yellow card) 69', (goal) 79'	Report	O'Shea (yellow card) 14', (goal) 45'; Brownhill (yellow card) 26'	Stadium: Anfield; Attendance: 59,896; Referee: Tim Robinson

17 February 2024 25	Brentford	1–4	Liverpool	Brentford
12:30 GMT	Reguilón (yellow card) 45'; Onyeka (yellow card) 72'; Toney 75'	Report	Núñez 35'; Mac Allister 55'; Endo (yellow card) 67'; Salah 68'; Gakpo 86'	Stadium: Brentford Community Stadium; Attendance: 17,193; Referee: Michael Oliver

21 February 2024 26	Liverpool	4–1	Luton Town	Liverpool
19:30 GMT	Van Dijk 56'; Gakpo 58'; Díaz 71'; Gomez (yellow card) 82'; Elliott 90'	Report	Ogbene 12'; Doughty (yellow card) 18'; Woodrow (yellow card) 42'; Barkley (yellow card) 77'; Kaboré (yellow card) 89'	Stadium: Anfield; Attendance: 59,896; Referee: Andy Madley
Note: Fixture was initially scheduled for 24 February, but was moved due to Liverpool’s participation in the EFL Cup final.

2 March 2024 27	Nottingham Forest	0–1	Liverpool	West Bridgford
15:00 GMT	Gibbs-White (yellow card) 90+3'; Danilo (yellow card) 90+3'; Felipe (yellow card) 90+11'	Report	Robertson (yellow card) 59'; Danns (yellow card) 85'; Núñez 90+9'	Stadium: City Ground; Attendance: 29,603; Referee: Paul Tierney

10 March 2024 28	Liverpool	1–1	Manchester City	Liverpool
15:45 GMT	Mac Allister 50' (pen.)	Report	Stones 23'; Rodri (yellow card) 45+3'; Ederson (yellow card) 47'; Silva (yellow card) 59'	Stadium: Anfield; Attendance: 59,947; Referee: Michael Oliver

31 March 2024 30	Liverpool	2–1	Brighton & Hove Albion	Liverpool
14:00 BST	Mac Allister (yellow card) 14'; Díaz 27'; Van Dijk (yellow card) 50'; Gomez (yellow card) 58'; Salah 65'; Endo (yellow card) 88'; Gakpo (yellow card) 90+5'	Report	Welbeck 2', (yellow card) 48'; Groß (yellow card) 20'; Van Hecke (yellow card) 71'	Stadium: Anfield; Attendance: 60,061; Referee: David Coote

4 April 2024 31	Liverpool	3–1	Sheffield United	Liverpool
19:30 BST	Núñez 17'; Mac Allister 76'; Gakpo 90'	Report	Bradley 58' (o.g.); McBurnie (yellow card) 87'	Stadium: Anfield; Attendance: 60,055; Referee: Stuart Attwell

7 April 2024 32	Manchester United	2–2	Liverpool	Trafford
15:30 BST	Fernandes 50'; Mainoo 67'; Kambwala (yellow card) 74'; Onana (yellow card) 80'; Mount (yellow card) 90+3'; Antony (yellow card) 90+4'; Casemiro (yellow card) 90+7'	Report	Bradley (yellow card) 7'; Díaz 23'; Salah 84' (pen.); Jones (yellow card) 89'	Stadium: Old Trafford; Attendance: 73,522; Referee: Anthony Taylor

14 April 2024 33	Liverpool	0–1	Crystal Palace	Liverpool
14:00 BST	Jones (yellow card) 71'	Report	Eze 14'; Lerma (yellow card) 90+7'	Stadium: Anfield; Attendance: 60,090; Referee: Chris Kavanagh

21 April 2024 34	Fulham	1–3	Liverpool	Fulham
16:30 BST	Palhinha (yellow card) 30'; Adarabioyo (yellow card) 39'; Castagne 45+2', (yellow card) 79'	Report	Alexander-Arnold 32'; Gravenberch 53'; Jota 72'	Stadium: Craven Cottage; Attendance: 24,401; Referee: Craig Pawson

24 April 2024 29	Everton	2–0	Liverpool	Liverpool
20:00 BST	Branthwaite 27'; Calvert-Lewin 58'	Report	Van Dijk (yellow card) 37'; Díaz (yellow card) 90+3'; Núñez (yellow card) 90+3'	Stadium: Goodison Park; Attendance: 38,222; Referee: Andy Madley
Note: Fixture was initially scheduled for 17 March, but was moved due to Liverpool’s participation in the FA Cup quarter-finals.

27 April 2024 35	West Ham United	2–2	Liverpool	Stratford
12:30 BST	Bowen 43'; Antonio 77'	Report	Endo (yellow card) 30'; Robertson 48'; Areola 65' (o.g.); Mac Allister (yellow card) 90+5'	Stadium: London Stadium; Attendance: 62,474; Referee: Anthony Taylor

5 May 2024 36	Liverpool	4–2	Tottenham Hotspur	Liverpool
16:30 BST	Salah 16'; Robertson 45'; Gakpo 50'; Elliott 59'; Alexander-Arnold (yellow card) 90+2'	Report	Sarr (yellow card) 44'; Van de Ven (yellow card) 47'; Emerson (yellow card) 57'; Bissouma (yellow card) 63'; Richarlison 72'; Son Heung-min 77'	Stadium: Anfield; Attendance: 60,075; Referee: Paul Tierney

13 May 2024 37	Aston Villa	3–3	Liverpool	Birmingham
20:00 BST	Tielemans 12'; McGinn (yellow card) 69'; Durán 85', 88'	Report	Martínez 2' (o.g.); Gakpo 23'; Elliott (yellow card) 38'; Quansah 48'	Stadium: Villa Park; Attendance: 42,241; Referee: Simon Hooper

19 May 2024 38	Liverpool	2–0	Wolverhampton Wanderers	Liverpool
16:00 BST	Mac Allister 34'; Quansah 40'; Endo (yellow card) 60'	Report	Semedo (red card) 28'; T. Gomes (yellow card) 45+1'	Stadium: Anfield; Attendance: 60,059; Referee: Chris Kavanagh

=== FA Cup ===
As a Premier League side, Liverpool entered the competition in the third round and were drawn away to fellow Premier League side Arsenal. They were then drawn at home against Norwich City in the fourth round, against Southampton in the fifth round and away to Manchester United in the quarter-finals.

Win Draw Loss Fixtures

7 January 2024 Third round	Arsenal	0–2	Liverpool	Holloway
16:30 GMT	Saliba (yellow card) 65'	Report	Elliott (yellow card) 70'; Kiwior 80' (o.g.); Gravenberch (yellow card) 90'; Clark (yellow card) 90+1'; Alexander-Arnold (yellow card) 90+4'; Díaz 90+5'	Stadium: Emirates Stadium; Attendance: 58,538; Referee: John Brooks

28 January 2024 Fourth round	Liverpool	5–2	Norwich City	Liverpool
14:30 GMT	Jones 16'; Núñez 28'; Jota 53'; Van Dijk 63'; Gravenberch 90+5'	Report	Gibson 22'; Sainz 69'	Stadium: Anfield; Attendance: 57,334; Referee: Sam Barrott

28 February 2024 Fifth round	Liverpool	3–0	Southampton	Liverpool
20:00 GMT	Koumas 44'; Danns 73', 88'	Report	Manning (yellow card) 79'	Stadium: Anfield; Attendance: 59,782; Referee: Craig Pawson

17 March 2024 Quarter-finals	Manchester United	4–3 (a.e.t.)	Liverpool	Trafford
15:30 GMT	McTominay 10'; Fernandes (yellow card) 45+3'; Antony 87'; Rashford 112'; Amad (yellow card) 116' (yellow-red card) 120+2', (goal) 120+1'	Report	Mac Allister (yellow card) 31', (goal) 44'; Salah 45+2'; Gomez (yellow card) 60'; Elliott 105'; Kelleher (yellow card) 109'	Stadium: Old Trafford; Attendance: 72,291; Referee: John Brooks

=== EFL Cup ===
As one of the Premier League sides participating in European competitions, Liverpool entered the EFL Cup in the third round, and were drawn at home to Championship side Leicester City. They were then drawn away to fellow Premier League club Bournemouth in the fourth round, and at home against Premier League side West Ham United in the quarter-finals. In the two-legged semi-finals, they were drawn against Fulham, first leg at home then second leg away.

Win Draw Loss Fixtures

27 September 2023 Third round	Liverpool	3–1	Leicester City	Liverpool
19:45 BST	Gakpo 48'; Szoboszlai 70'; Endo (yellow card) 86'; Jota 89'	Report	McAteer 3'; Pereira (yellow card) 23'; Choudhury (yellow card) 45+2'	Stadium: Anfield; Attendance: 49,732; Referee: Tim Robinson

1 November 2023 Fourth round	Bournemouth	1–2	Liverpool	Bournemouth
19:45 GMT	Kerkez (yellow card) 53'; Scott (yellow card) 55'; Kluivert 64'	Report	Gakpo 31', (yellow card) 55'; Núñez 70'	Stadium: Dean Court; Attendance: 11,116; Referee: John Brooks

20 December 2023 Quarter-finals	Liverpool	5–1	West Ham United	Liverpool
20:00 GMT	Szoboszlai 28'; Jones 56', 84'; Gakpo 71'; Salah 82'; Núñez (yellow card) 90'	Report	Álvarez (yellow card) 52'; Bowen 77'	Stadium: Anfield; Attendance: 57,332; Referee: Tim Robinson

10 January 2024 Semi-finals First leg	Liverpool	2–1	Fulham	Liverpool
20:00 GMT	Van Dijk (yellow card) 24'; Jones 68'; Gakpo 71'	Report	Willian 19'; Lukić (yellow card) 88'; Wilson (yellow card) 90+1'	Stadium: Anfield; Attendance: 56,724; Referee: David Coote

24 January 2024 Semi-finals Second leg	Fulham	1–1 (2–3 agg.)	Liverpool	Fulham
20:00 GMT	Cairney (yellow card) 42'; Diop 76', (yellow card) 78'; Wilson (yellow card) 90+5'	Report	Díaz 11'; Kelleher (yellow card) 90+3'	Stadium: Craven Cottage; Attendance: 24,320; Referee: Simon Hooper

25 February 2024 Final	Chelsea	0–1 (a.e.t.)	Liverpool	Wembley
15:00 GMT	Chilwell (yellow card) 45+3'; Palmer (yellow card) 120+2'	Report	Bradley (yellow card) 45+3'; Mac Allister (yellow card) 81'; Konaté (yellow card) 82'; McConnell (yellow card) 107'; Van Dijk 118'; Gomez (yellow card) 120+3'	Stadium: Wembley Stadium; Attendance: 88,868; Referee: Chris Kavanagh

=== UEFA Europa League ===
==== Group stage ====
The draw for the group stage was held on 1 September 2023 with the fixtures announced the following day. Liverpool advanced to the knockout phase as group winners.

Pos	Team	Pld	W	D	L	GF	GA	GD	Pts	Qualification	LIV	TOU	USG	LAS
1	(England) Liverpool	6	4	0	2	17	7	+10	12	Advance to round of 16	—	5–1	2–0	4–0
2	(France) Toulouse	6	3	2	1	8	9	−1	11	Advance to knockout round play-offs	3–2	—	0–0	1–0
3	(Belgium) Union Saint-Gilloise	6	2	2	2	5	8	−3	8	Transfer to Europa Conference League	2–1	1–1	—	2–1
4	(Austria) LASK	6	1	0	5	6	12	−6	3		1–3	1–2	3–0	—

Source: UEFA
Rules for classification: Group stage tiebreakers

Round	1	2	3	4	5	6
Ground	A	H	H	A	H	A
Result	W	W	W	L	W	L
Position	1	1	1	1	1	1
Points	3	6	9	9	12	12

Source: UEFA
A = Away; H = Home; W = Win; D = Draw; L = Loss

Win Draw Loss Fixtures

21 September 2023 1	LASK (Austria)	1–3	(England) Liverpool	Linz, Austria
18:45 CEST	Flecker 14'; Havel (yellow card) 41'; Žulj (yellow card) 45'; Ziereis (yellow card) 56'	Report	Konaté (yellow card) 40'; Bajcetic (yellow card) 43'; Núñez 56' (pen.); Díaz 63'; Salah 88'	Stadium: Raiffeisen Arena; Attendance: 18,091; Referee: Marco Di Bello (Italy)

5 October 2023 2	Liverpool (England)	2–0	(Belgium) Union Saint-Gilloise	Liverpool, England
20:00 BST	Gravenberch 44'; Jota 90+2'	Report		Stadium: Anfield; Attendance: 49,513; Referee: Morten Krogh (Denmark)

26 October 2023 3	Liverpool (England)	5–1	(France) Toulouse	Liverpool, England
20:00 BST	Jota 9'; Endo 30'; Núñez 34'; Gravenberch 65'; Elliott (yellow card) 75'; Salah 90+3'	Report	Dallinga 16'	Stadium: Anfield; Attendance: 49,338; Referee: Rade Obrenović (Slovenia)

9 November 2023 4	Toulouse (France)	3–2	(England) Liverpool	Toulouse, France
18:45 CET	Schmidt (yellow card) 11'; Dønnum 36'; Dallinga 58'; Magri 76'; Kamanzi (yellow card) 90+4'; Restes (yellow card) 90+6'; Nicolaisen (yellow card) 90+7'; Diarra (yellow card) 90+7'	Report	Endo (yellow card) 34'; Cásseres 74' (o.g.); Jota 89'; Núñez (yellow card) 90+4'	Stadium: Stadium de Toulouse; Attendance: 32,026; Referee: Georgi Kabakov (Bulgaria)

30 November 2023 5	Liverpool (England)	4–0	(Austria) LASK	Liverpool, England
20:00 GMT	Díaz 12'; Gakpo 15', 90+2'; Salah 51' (pen.)	Report	Talovyerov (yellow card) 58'	Stadium: Anfield; Attendance: 49,666; Referee: Urs Schnyder (Switzerland)

14 December 2023 6	Union Saint-Gilloise (Belgium)	2–1	(England) Liverpool	Brussels, Belgium
18:45 CET	Amoura 32'; Puertas 43'; Sadiki (yellow card) 53'	Report	Bradley (yellow card) 24'; Quansah 40'; Scanlon (yellow card) 90+2'	Stadium: Constant Vanden Stock Stadium; Attendance: 16,959; Referee: Orel Grinfeld (Israel)
Note: Union Saint-Gilloise hosted the match at the Constant Vanden Stock Stadium, instead of their regular stadium, the Joseph Marien Stadium in Brussels, which did not meet UEFA requirements.

==== Knockout phase ====
===== Round of 16 =====
The round of 16 draw was held on 23 February 2024. Liverpool were drawn against Czech First League champions Sparta Prague.

7 March 2024 First leg	Sparta Prague (Czech Republic)	1–5	(England) Liverpool	Prague, Czech Republic
18:45 CET	Bradley 46' (o.g.); Krejčí (yellow card) 62'; Zelený (yellow card) 73'	Report	Mac Allister 6' (pen.); Núñez 25', 45+3'; Díaz 53'; Szoboszlai 90+4'	Stadium: Stadion Letná; Attendance: 18,349; Referee: José María Sánchez Martínez (Spain)

14 March 2024 Second leg	Liverpool (England)	6–1 (11–2 agg.)	(Czech Republic) Sparta Prague	Liverpool, England
20:00 GMT	Núñez 7'; Clark 8'; Salah 10'; Gakpo 14', 55'; Szoboszlai 48'; Quansah (yellow card) 64'	Report	Birmančević 42'	Stadium: Anfield; Attendance: 59,581; Referee: Artur Soares Dias (Portugal)

===== Quarter-finals =====
The quarter-final draw was held on 15 March 2024. Liverpool were drawn against Serie A side Atalanta.

11 April 2024 First leg	Liverpool (England)	0–3	(Italy) Atalanta	Liverpool, England
20:00 BST		Report	Hien (yellow card) 25'; Scamacca 38', 60'; Ruggeri (yellow card) 77'; Pašalić 83'	Stadium: Anfield; Attendance: 59,004; Referee: Halil Umut Meler (Turkey)

18 April 2024 Second leg	Atalanta (Italy)	0–1 (3–1 agg.)	(England) Liverpool	Bergamo, Italy
21:00 CEST	Hien (yellow card) 43'; Koopmeiners (yellow card) 77'; Zappacosta (yellow card) 90+1'	Report	Salah 7' (pen.)	Stadium: Stadio Atleti Azzurri d'Italia; Attendance: 14,994; Referee: François Letexier (France)

== Squad statistics ==
=== Appearances ===
Players with no appearances are not included on the list.

No.	Pos	Nat	Player	Total		Premier League		FA Cup		EFL Cup		Europa League	
No.	Pos	Nat	Player	Apps	Goals	Apps	Goals	Apps	Goals	Apps	Goals	Apps	Goals
1	GK	(Brazil) BRA	Alisson Becker	32	0	28+0	0	2+0	0	0+0	0	2+0	0
2	DF	(England) ENG	Joe Gomez	51	0	17+15	0	4+0	0	4+1	0	6+4	0
3	MF	(Japan) JPN	Wataru Endo	43	2	20+9	1	1+0	0	4+0	0	9+0	1
4	DF	(Netherlands) NED	Virgil van Dijk	48	4	36+0	2	2+1	1	4+0	1	3+2	0
5	DF	(France) FRA	Ibrahima Konaté	37	0	17+5	0	2+1	0	3+2	0	7+0	0
6	MF	(Spain) ESP	Thiago	1	0	0+1	0	0+0	0	0+0	0	0+0	0
7	FW	(Colombia) COL	Luis Díaz	51	13	32+5	8	2+1	1	3+1	1	5+2	3
8	MF	(Hungary) HUN	Dominik Szoboszlai	45	7	25+8	3	1+1	0	2+1	2	2+5	2
9	FW	(Uruguay) URU	Darwin Núñez	54	18	22+14	11	3+0	1	2+3	1	6+4	5
10	MF	(Argentina) ARG	Alexis Mac Allister	46	7	31+2	5	2+1	1	3+1	0	4+2	1
11	FW	(Egypt) EGY	Mohamed Salah	44	25	28+4	18	1+0	1	1+1	1	4+5	5
17	MF	(England) ENG	Curtis Jones	36	5	14+9	1	2+0	1	4+1	3	4+2	0
18	FW	(Netherlands) NED	Cody Gakpo	53	16	17+18	8	3+1	0	5+1	4	7+1	4
19	MF	(England) ENG	Harvey Elliott	53	4	11+23	3	2+1	1	6+0	0	8+2	0
20	FW	(Portugal) POR	Diogo Jota	32	15	14+7	10	1+1	1	2+2	1	2+3	3
21	DF	(Greece) GRE	Kostas Tsimikas	25	0	8+5	0	1+1	0	3+1	0	5+1	0
26	DF	(Scotland) SCO	Andy Robertson	30	3	18+5	3	1+1	0	1+0	0	3+1	0
32	DF	(Cameroon) CMR	Joël Matip	14	0	9+1	0	0+0	0	1+0	0	2+1	0
38	MF	(Netherlands) NED	Ryan Gravenberch	38	4	12+14	1	1+1	1	4+1	0	4+1	2
42	MF	(England) ENG	Bobby Clark	12	1	1+4	0	1+2	0	0+2	0	1+1	1
43	MF	(Spain) ESP	Stefan Bajcetic	3	0	0+1	0	0+0	0	0+1	0	1+0	0
44	DF	(England) ENG	Luke Chambers	4	0	0+0	0	0+0	0	0+1	0	2+1	0
48	DF	(England) ENG	Calum Scanlon	2	0	0+0	0	0+0	0	0+0	0	0+2	0
49	MF	(England) ENG	Kaide Gordon	3	0	0+1	0	0+1	0	0+0	0	1+0	0
50	FW	(Scotland) SCO	Ben Gannon-Doak	5	0	0+1	0	0+0	0	1+0	0	3+0	0
53	MF	(England) ENG	James McConnell	9	0	0+3	0	2+0	0	0+1	0	0+3	0
62	GK	(Republic of Ireland) IRL	Caoimhín Kelleher	26	0	10+0	0	2+0	0	6+0	0	8+0	0
63	DF	(Wales) WAL	Owen Beck	1	0	0+1	0	0+0	0	0+0	0	0+0	0
66	DF	(England) ENG	Trent Alexander-Arnold	37	3	25+3	3	1+1	0	0+2	0	3+2	0
67	FW	(Wales) WAL	Lewis Koumas	1	1	0+0	0	1+0	1	0+0	0	0+0	0
76	FW	(England) ENG	Jayden Danns	5	2	0+2	0	0+1	2	0+1	0	0+1	0
78	DF	(England) ENG	Jarell Quansah	33	3	13+4	2	4+0	0	4+1	0	6+1	1
84	DF	(Northern Ireland) NIR	Conor Bradley	23	1	10+1	1	2+2	0	3+1	0	2+2	0
92	FW	(Poland) POL	Mateusz Musiałowski	1	0	0+0	0	0+0	0	0+0	0	0+1	0
98	MF	(England) ENG	Trey Nyoni	1	0	0+0	0	0+1	0	0+0	0	0+0	0

=== Goals ===
Rank	Pos.	No.	Player	Premier League	FA Cup	EFL Cup	Europa League	Total
1	FW	11	(Egypt) Mohamed Salah	18	1	1	5	25
2	FW	9	(Uruguay) Darwin Núñez	11	1	1	5	18
3	FW	18	(Netherlands) Cody Gakpo	8	0	4	4	16
4	FW	20	(Portugal) Diogo Jota	10	1	1	3	15
5	FW	7	(Colombia) Luis Díaz	8	1	1	3	13
6	MF	8	(Hungary) Dominik Szoboszlai	3	0	2	2	7
6	MF	10	(Argentina) Alexis Mac Allister	5	1	0	1	7
8	MF	17	(England) Curtis Jones	1	1	3	0	5
9	DF	4	(Netherlands) Virgil van Dijk	2	1	1	0	4
9	MF	19	(England) Harvey Elliott	3	1	0	0	4
9	MF	38	(Netherlands) Ryan Gravenberch	1	1	0	2	4
12	DF	26	(Scotland) Andy Robertson	3	0	0	0	3
12	DF	66	(England) Trent Alexander-Arnold	3	0	0	0	3
12	DF	78	(England) Jarell Quansah	2	0	0	1	3
15	MF	3	(Japan) Wataru Endo	1	0	0	1	2
15	FW	76	(England) Jayden Danns	0	2	0	0	2
17	MF	42	(England) Bobby Clark	0	0	0	1	1
17	FW	67	(Wales) Lewis Koumas	0	1	0	0	1
17	DF	84	(Northern Ireland) Conor Bradley	1	0	0	0	1
Own goals				6	1	0	1	8
Total				86	13	14	29	142

=== Clean sheets ===
No.	Player	Premier League	FA Cup	EFL Cup	Europa League	Total
1	(Brazil) Alisson Becker	8	1	0	2	11
62	(Republic of Ireland) Caoimhín Kelleher	2	1	1	1	5
Total		10	2	1	3	16

=== Disciplinary record ===
No.	Pos.	Player	Premier League			FA Cup			EFL Cup			Europa League			Total		
No.	Pos.	Player	Yellow card	(yellow card) (yellow-red card)	Red card	Yellow card	(yellow card) (yellow-red card)	Red card	Yellow card	(yellow card) (yellow-red card)	Red card	Yellow card	(yellow card) (yellow-red card)	Red card	Yellow card	(yellow card) (yellow-red card)	Red card
1	GK	(Brazil) Alisson Becker	1	0	0	0	0	0	0	0	0	0	0	0	1	0	0
2	DF	(England) Joe Gomez	5	0	0	1	0	0	1	0	0	0	0	0	7	0	0
3	MF	(Japan) Wataru Endo	10	0	0	0	0	0	1	0	0	1	0	0	12	0	0
4	DF	(Netherlands) Virgil van Dijk	3	0	1	0	0	0	1	0	0	0	0	0	4	0	1
5	DF	(France) Ibrahima Konaté	3	1	0	0	0	0	1	0	0	1	0	0	5	1	0
7	FW	(Colombia) Luis Díaz	4	0	0	0	0	0	0	0	0	1	0	0	5	0	0
8	MF	(Hungary) Dominik Szoboszlai	1	0	0	0	0	0	0	0	0	0	0	0	1	0	0
9	FW	(Uruguay) Darwin Núñez	9	0	0	0	0	0	1	0	0	1	0	0	11	0	0
10	MF	(Argentina) Alexis Mac Allister	7	0	1 (Note: Mac Allister was shown a red card during Liverpool's match against Bournemouth on 19 August 2023, but it was later overturned following an appeal.)	1	0	0	1	0	0	0	0	0	9	0	1
11	FW	(Egypt) Mohamed Salah	2	0	0	0	0	0	0	0	0	0	0	0	2	0	0
17	MF	(England) Curtis Jones	1	0	1	0	0	0	0	0	0	0	0	0	1	0	1
18	FW	(Netherlands) Cody Gakpo	1	0	0	0	0	0	1	0	0	0	0	0	2	0	0
19	MF	(England) Harvey Elliott	2	0	0	1	0	0	0	0	0	1	0	0	4	0	0
20	FW	(Portugal) Diogo Jota	1	1	0	0	0	0	0	0	0	0	0	0	1	1	0
26	DF	(Scotland) Andy Robertson	2	0	0	0	0	0	0	0	0	0	0	0	2	0	0
32	DF	(Cameroon) Joël Matip	2	0	0	0	0	0	0	0	0	0	0	0	2	0	0
38	MF	(Netherlands) Ryan Gravenberch	0	0	0	1	0	0	0	0	0	0	0	0	1	0	0
42	MF	(England) Bobby Clark	0	0	0	1	0	0	0	0	0	0	0	0	1	0	0
43	MF	(Spain) Stefan Bajcetic	0	0	0	0	0	0	0	0	0	1	0	0	1	0	0
48	DF	(England) Calum Scanlon	0	0	0	0	0	0	0	0	0	1	0	0	1	0	0
53	MF	(England) James McConnell	0	0	0	0	0	0	1	0	0	0	0	0	1	0	0
62	GK	(Republic of Ireland) Caoimhín Kelleher	0	0	0	1	0	0	1	0	0	0	0	0	2	0	0
66	DF	(England) Trent Alexander-Arnold	6	0	0	1	0	0	0	0	0	0	0	0	7	0	0
76	FW	(England) Jayden Danns	1	0	0	0	0	0	0	0	0	0	0	0	1	0	0
78	DF	(England) Jarell Quansah	1	0	0	0	0	0	0	0	0	1	0	0	2	0	0
84	DF	(Northern Ireland) Conor Bradley	2	0	0	0	0	0	1	0	0	1	0	0	4	0	0
Total			64	2	3	7	0	0	10	0	0	9	0	0	89	2	3

== Club awards ==
=== Player of the Month award ===
Awarded monthly to the player that was chosen by fans voting on liverpoolfc.com

Month	Player	Ref.
August	(Hungary) Dominik Szoboszlai	
September	(Egypt) Mohamed Salah	
October	(Egypt) Mohamed Salah	
November	(Egypt) Mohamed Salah	
December	(Japan) Wataru Endo	
January	(Northern Ireland) Conor Bradley	
February	(Netherlands) Virgil van Dijk	
March	(Argentina) Alexis Mac Allister	
April	(Colombia) Luis Díaz	

=== Player of the Season award ===
Mohamed Salah won the Player of the Season award for the fourth time.
