= Luke Chambers (footballer, born 2004) =

English footballer

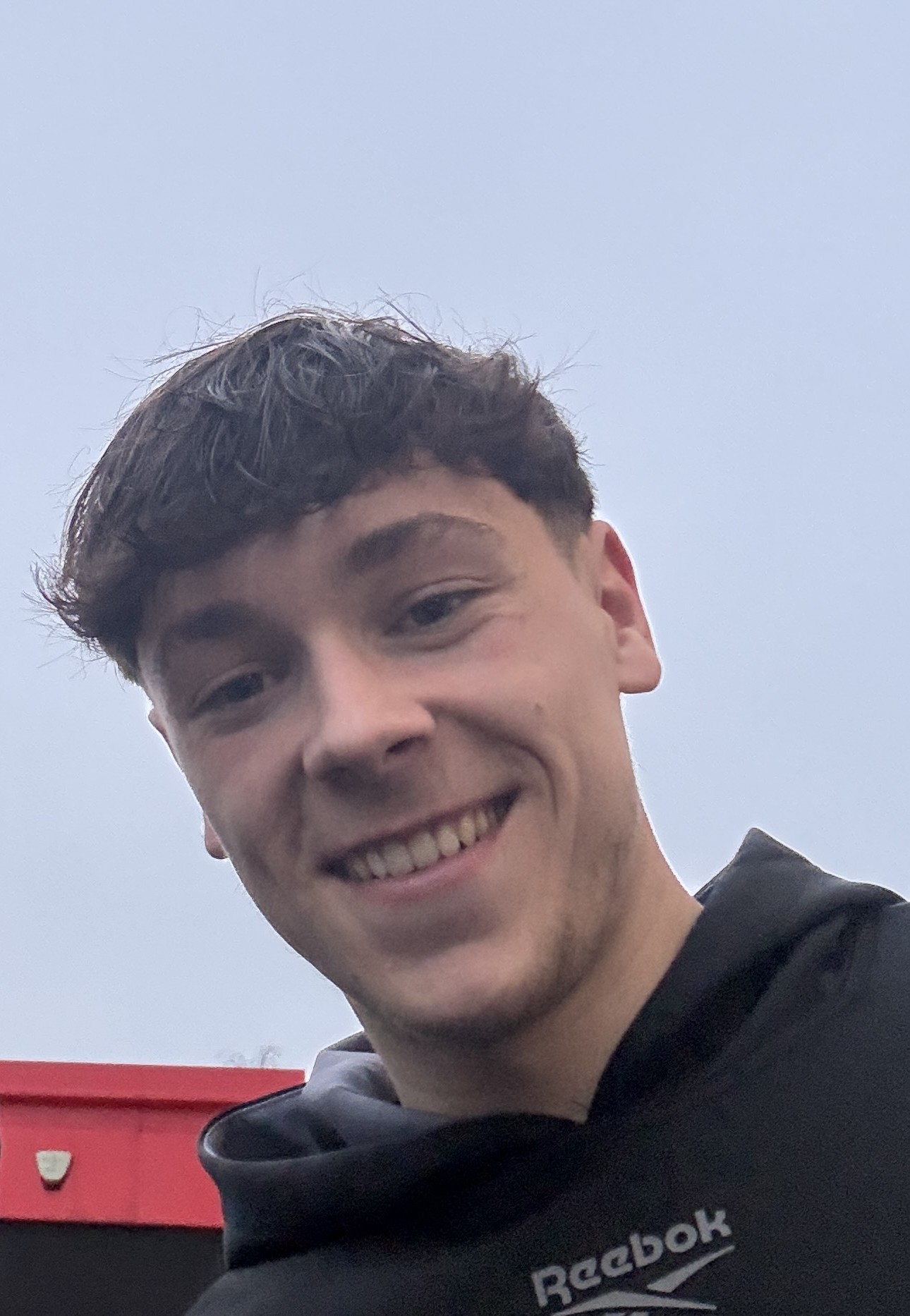
- Chambers in 2026.

Personal information
- Full name: Luke Chambers
- Date of birth: 24 June 2004 (age 22)
- Place of birth: Preston, Lancashire, England
- Height: 5 ft 11 in (1.81 m)
- Position: Left-back

Team information
- Current team: Liverpool
- Number: 44

Youth career
- 2010–2022: Liverpool

Senior career*
Years	Team	Apps	(Gls)
2022–	Liverpool	0	(0)
2023	→ Kilmarnock (loan)	14	(0)
2024	→ Wigan Athletic (loan)	18	(1)
2024–2025	→ Wigan Athletic (loan)	12	(1)
2026	→ Charlton Athletic (loan)	18	(0)

International career^{‡}
2019	England U15	2	(0)
2019	England U16	2	(0)
2021	England U18	1	(0)
2021–2023	England U19	14	(1)
2023–2024	England U20	6	(0)
Medal record
Men's football
Representing England
UEFA European Under-19 Championship
Winner	2022 Slovakia
- * Club domestic league appearances and goals as of 17:10, 2 May 2026 (UTC) ‡ National team caps and goals as of 22:17, 25 September 2024 (UTC)

Luke Chambers (born 24 June 2004) is an English professional footballer who plays as a left-back for Premier League club Liverpool. He was part of the England national under-19 football team that won the 2022 UEFA European Under-19 Championship.

== Club career ==
=== Liverpool ===
From Chorley, Lancashire, Chambers joined the Liverpool Academy when he was six years old. After moving through the age group teams, when he was aged 18 years old Chambers travelled with the first team Liverpool squad on their pre-season tour of Asia where he played in matches against Manchester United and Crystal Palace. In July 2022, he signed a professional contract with Liverpool. During the 2022–23 season, Chambers began to be involved in the first team squad for Premier League matches and being named among the match day substitutes.

In September 2022, Chambers was name-checked by Liverpool's first team assistant manager Pepijn Lijnders, along with Bobby Clark and Stefan Bajcetic, as "stand out" players from the Liverpool Youth Team. He also impressed Liverpool first team left-back Kostas Tsimikas who said "This kid [Chambers] impresses me a lot. He's a very, very good player and always very focused in the training. For me, my personal advice for him is to never stop dreaming and never stop working hard, because in football that's the most important [thing]. I'm really sure the future is bright for him."

==== Loan to Kilmarnock ====
On 30 January 2023, Chambers joined Scottish Premiership club Kilmarnock on loan until the end of the season. On 1 February, he made his senior debut against Dundee United and provided the assist for the only goal of the game. Afterwards, he received praise from manager Derek McInnes who said it was a "great debut" and added that Chambers "was making his senior debut at 18, there was a lot of nerves, but the level of performance was very mature". Chambers turned down the chance to represent England U-20s at the 2023 FIFA U-20 World Cup in order to finish the season with Kilmarnock as the tournament began on 20 May 2023, before Kilmarnock were safe from relegation.

==== Return to Liverpool ====
On 27 September 2023, Chambers made his senior Liverpool debut, coming on as a substitute in a 3–1 EFL Cup victory over Leicester City at Anfield. He made his first start for the Reds in a 5–1 UEFA Europa League victory over Toulouse on 26 October 2023.

==== Loans to Wigan Athletic ====
On 12 January 2024, Chambers signed for EFL League One club Wigan Athletic on loan until the end of the season. He was credited with his first senior league goal against Portsmouth on 20 April 2024. Having participated in Liverpool's pre-season, he returned to Wigan on a season-long loan on 6 August 2024.

==== Charlton Athletic (loan) ====
On 21 January 2026, Chambers joined Championship club Charlton Athletic on loan for the remainder of the season.

==== Return to Liverpool ====
Chambers made his UEFA Champions League debut for Liverpool on 14 October 2026, coming on as a late substitute in a 6-3 away win against LASK.

== International career ==
Chambers was part of the England under-19 squad that won the 2022 UEFA European Under-19 Championship held in Slovakia in June and July 2022. He was a second-half substitute in the final as England defeated Israel in extra time to win the tournament. He scored his first goal for England U19s in September 2022 against Montenegro U19. In October 2023, he was called up to the England U-20 side for matches against Portugal U-20 and Romania U-20.

Chambers made his U20 debut during a 3–0 defeat to Italy at the Eco-Power Stadium on 16 November 2023.

== Career statistics ==
=== Club ===
As of match played 14 October 2026

Appearances and goals by club, season and competition
Club	Season	League			National cup (Note: Includes Scottish Cup)		League cup (Note: Includes EFL Cup)		Europe		Other		Total	
Club	Season	Division	Apps	Goals	Apps	Goals	Apps	Goals	Apps	Goals	Apps	Goals	Apps	Goals
Liverpool U21	2021–22	—			—		—		—		1 (Note: Appearance(s) in EFL Trophy)	0	1	0
Liverpool U21	2022–23	—			—		—		—		2	0	2	0
Liverpool U21	2023–24	—			—		—		—		2	0	2	0
Liverpool U21	Total		—		—		—		—		5	0	5	0
Liverpool	2022–23	Premier League	0	0	0	0	0	0	0	0	0	0	0	0
Liverpool	2023–24	Premier League	0	0	0	0	1	0	3 (Note: Appearances in UEFA Europa League)	0	—		4	0
Liverpool	2025–26	Premier League	0	0	0	0	0	0	0	0	0	0	0	0
Liverpool	2026–27	Premier League	0	0	0	0	0	0	1 (Note: Appearance in UEFA Champions League)	0	—		1	0
Liverpool	Total		0	0	0	0	1	0	4	0	0	0	5	0
Kilmarnock (loan)	2022–23	Scottish Premiership	14	0	2	0	—		—		—		16	0
Wigan Athletic (loan)	2023–24	League One	18	1	—		—		—		0	0	18	1
Wigan Athletic (loan)	2024–25	League One	12	1	0	0	1	0	—		0	0	13	1
Wigan Athletic (loan)	Total		30	2	0	0	1	0	—		0	0	31	2
Charlton Athletic (loan)	2025–26	Championship	18	0	—		—		—		—		18	0
Career total			62	2	2	0	2	0	4	0	5	0	75	2

== Honours ==
England under-19

- UEFA European Under-19 Championship: 2022
