= Owen Beck (footballer) =

Welsh footballer (born 2002)

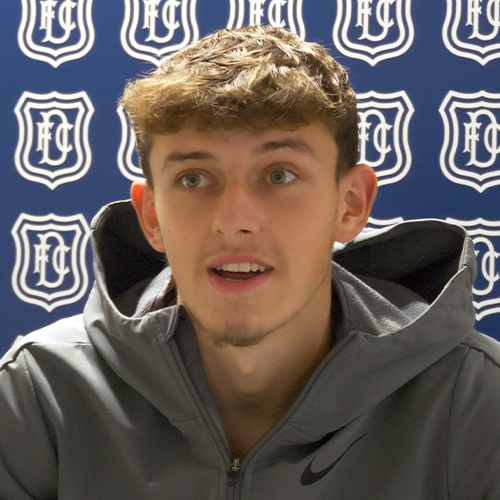
- Owen Beck during a Dundee interview in 2023

Personal information
- Full name: Owen Michael Beck
- Date of birth: 9 August 2002 (age 24)
- Place of birth: Wrexham, Wales
- Height: 1.77 m (5 ft 10 in)
- Position: Left-back

Team information
- Current team: Liverpool
- Number: 63

Youth career
- Flint Town United
- Tranmere Rovers
- Stoke City
- 2015–2021: Liverpool

Senior career*
Years	Team	Apps	(Gls)
2021–	Liverpool	1	(0)
2022	→ Famalicão (loan)	0	(0)
2022–2023	→ Bolton Wanderers (loan)	5	(0)
2023–2024	→ Dundee (loan)	25	(2)
2024–2025	→ Blackburn Rovers (loan)	24	(1)
2025–2026	→ Derby County (loan)	0	(0)

International career^{‡}
2018	Wales U17	1	(0)
2021–2023	Wales U21	14	(1)
- * Club domestic league appearances and goals as of 14:39, 25 May 2025 (UTC) ‡ National team caps and goals as of 22:00, 20 November 2023 (UTC)

Owen Michael Beck (born 9 August 2002) is a Welsh professional footballer who plays as a left-back for Premier League club Liverpool.

== Club career ==
=== Early career ===
Beck first played for the junior teams of his hometown club, Flint Town United as a striker. At the age of 10 he was awarded with a Flintshire Footballer of the Year award by Ian Rush. He then joined the youth set-up at Tranmere Rovers before moving to Stoke City, switching to playing in the full-back position.

He then joined the academy of Liverpool from Stoke as an under-13 player. He broke into the under-18 team in the 2019–20 season and was also a part of their Under-19 UEFA Youth League squad. He moved up to the under-23 squad for the 2020–21 season becoming a playing regular.

=== Liverpool ===
In June 2020 he signed his first professional contract with Liverpool, improved his terms in November 2020 and in July 2021 he signed a new long-term contract with the club.

He made two appearances for the first team in the 2021–22 pre-season, playing friendlies against Athletic Bilbao and Osasuna. On 27 October 2021, he made his competitive debut for the first team in an EFL Cup game against Preston North End.

==== 2022–23: Loans to Famalicão and Bolton Wanderers ====
On 11 July 2022 Beck joined Primeira Liga club Famalicão on loan for the duration of the 2022–23 season. Having made no appearances, he was recalled on 31 August and sent on loan to Bolton Wanderers instead. His best friend, Conor Bradley, was also on loan at Bolton. Beck made his league debut for Bolton in November 2022, coming on as a substitute in a 0–0 draw against Cambridge United. The loan was terminated by mutual agreement on 26 January 2023.

==== 2023–24: Loans to Dundee ====
On 3 July 2023, Beck joined Scottish Premiership club Dundee on a season-long loan. He made his competitive debut in a 1–0 Scottish League Cup group stage win away to Bonnyrigg Rose. He impressed during the early part of the season, and picked up the club's man of the match award during a home draw against Kilmarnock. Beck scored his first Dundee goal (as well as his first professional goal) in the league against Hibernian.

After excelling and becoming a fan favourite at Dens Park, Liverpool activated their recall clause on 1 January 2024 to terminate Beck's loan deal with Dundee due to an injury crisis at the left-back position. On 21 January, Beck made his Premier League debut with Liverpool as a substitute in a victory away to Bournemouth, ruling out a potential move to a third club this season due to having played for the maximum number of two clubs in one season.

On 30 January, Beck rejoined Dundee on loan until the end of the season. He made his return that same day, starting and assisting the only Dundee goal in an away draw against Aberdeen. In mid-March, Beck would return to Liverpool to get treatment for persistent groin injuries which would keep him out of action for the remainder of the season. In April 2024, Beck was named in the PFA Scotland Team of the Year.

==== 2024–25: Loan to Blackburn Rovers ====
On 27 August 2024, Beck joined EFL Championship club Blackburn Rovers on a season-long loan. He made his league debut in a 1–1 away draw in the East Lancashire derby against Burnley.

On 22 September 2024, Beck received a red card for dissent during a derby match against Preston North End. Beck appeared to insist opposition player Milutin Osmajić had bitten his neck by highlighting skin marks, while post-match imagery appeared to corroborate this claim. On 14 December, Beck scored his first goal for Rovers in a 2–0 victory at home to Luton Town, his first in English league football.

==== 2025–26: Loan to Derby County ====
On 25 July 2025, Beck signed a new long-term contract with Liverpool and immediately joined EFL Championship club Derby County on a season-long loan deal. Later on in July, Beck suffered a muscle injury which ruled him out of action for the start of Derby's season. On 4 January 2026, the club announced that Beck would return to Liverpool after failing to make a single appearance due to persistent injury issues.

== International career ==
Beck played for Wales as a schoolboy.

In October 2018 he featured in the Wales under-17 team in a match against Kazakhstan, playing 72 minutes of a UEFA European Under-17 Championship qualification match.

In March 2021 he was called up for the Wales under-21 team for a friendly match against the Republic of Ireland but was an unused substitute on matchday.

In August he was again called up and made his debut on 7 September as a 79th minute substitute in a 4–0 victory over Bulgaria in a Euro 2023 qualifying game. He scored his first goal for the Welsh under-21 team on 12 November 2021 with the opening goal in a 7–0 victory over Gibraltar.

In October 2023, Beck was called up to the Wales senior national team for the first time. He would also get called up to the Wales U21 side the following day, with the clarification that Beck would be joining the senior squad for their match against Gibraltar, before joining the U21 side for the rest of the international window.

== Personal life ==
Beck was born to parents Shaun Beck and Sara James. He has two brothers and a sister. Beck is the great-nephew of former Liverpool striker Ian Rush, whose sister Carol is Beck's grandmother.

== Career statistics ==
As of matches played 29 March 2025

Appearances and goals by club, season and competition
Club	Season	League			National cup		League cup		Other		Total	
Club	Season	Division	Apps	Goals	Apps	Goals	Apps	Goals	Apps	Goals	Apps	Goals
Liverpool U21	2019–20	—			—		—		1 (Note: Appearances in EFL Trophy)	0	1	0
Liverpool U21	2020–21	—			—		—		3	0	3	0
Liverpool U21	Total		0	0	0	0	0	0	4	0	4	0
Liverpool	2021–22	Premier League	0	0	0	0	2	0	0	0	2	0
Liverpool	2022–23	Premier League	0	0	0	0	0	0	0	0	0	0
Liverpool	2023–24	Premier League	1	0	0	0	0	0	0	0	1	0
Liverpool	2024–25	Premier League	0	0	0	0	0	0	0	0	0	0
Liverpool	2025–26	Premier League	0	0	0	0	0	0	0	0	0	0
Liverpool	Total		1	0	0	0	2	0	0	0	3	0
Famalicão (loan)	2022–23	Primeira Liga	0	0	0	0	0	0	—		0	0
Bolton Wanderers (loan)	2022–23	League One	5	0	1	0	0	0	3	0	9	0
Dundee (loan)	2023–24	Scottish Premiership	25	2	0	0	3	0	0	0	28	2
Blackburn Rovers (loan)	2024–25	Championship	24	1	1	0	3	0	0	0	25	1
Derby County (loan)	2025–26	Championship	0	0	0	0	0	0	0	0	0	0
Career total			55	3	2	0	8	0	7	0	72	3

== Honours ==
Liverpool Academy

- Lancashire Senior Cup: 2021–22

Individual

- PFA Scottish Premiership Team of the Year: 2023–24
