= Stefan Bajcetic =

Spanish footballer (born 2004)

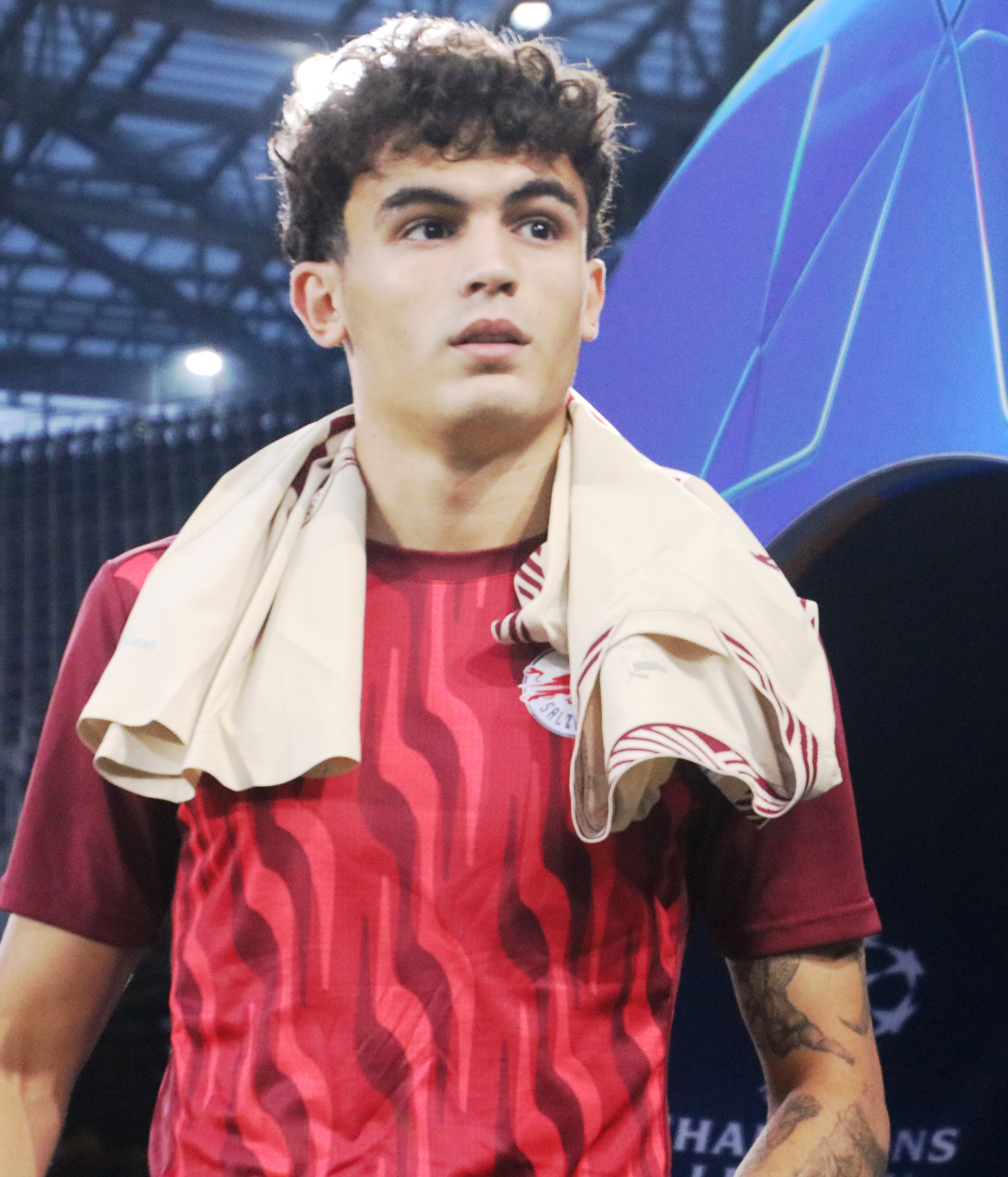
- Bajcetic warming up for Red Bull Salzburg in 2024

Personal information
- Full name: Stefan Bajcetic Maquieira
- Date of birth: 22 October 2004 (age 22)
- Place of birth: Vigo, Spain
- Height: 1.85 m (6 ft 1 in)
- Positions: Defensive midfielder; centre-back

Team information
- Current team: Celta B
- Number: 22

Youth career
- 2013–2020: Celta Vigo
- 2020–2022: Liverpool

Senior career*
Years	Team	Apps	(Gls)
2022–2026	Liverpool	12	(1)
2024–2025	→ Red Bull Salzburg (loan)	12	(0)
2025	→ Las Palmas (loan)	14	(1)
2026–	Celta B	0	(0)

International career^{‡}
2021	Spain U18	3	(0)
2023–	Spain U21	5	(0)
- * Club domestic league appearances and goals as of 21:55, 13 May 2025 (UTC) ‡ National team caps and goals as of 23:57, 25 March 2025 (UTC)

Stefan Bajcetic Maquieira (Serbian: Стефан Бајчетић, Stefan Bajčetić; born 22 October 2004) is a Spanish professional footballer who plays as a defensive midfielder or centre-back for Segunda División club Celta Fortuna.

== Early life ==
Stefan Bajcetic Maquieira was born on 22 October 2004 in Vigo, Galicia. He is the son of Serbian former footballer Srđan Bajčetić and a Galician mother.

== Club career ==
Bajcetic was a member of the Celta Vigo youth academy, and signed for Premier League club Liverpool in December 2020 for £224,000.

Bajcetic's progress was rewarded with a new contract in August 2022. He made his professional debut on 27 August, coming on as a substitute in a 9–0 home win over Bournemouth. Bajcetic made his UEFA Champions League debut against Ajax on 13 September as a 94th-minute substitution, replacing Thiago. In doing so, he became Liverpool's youngest-ever player in the Champions League, beating the record previously held by Billy Koumetio.

On 9 November 2022, Bajcetic started his first game for Liverpool, in a home win against Derby County in the third round of the 2022–23 EFL Cup. On 26 December, as a 79th-minute substitute, Bajcetic scored his first senior goal for Liverpool in their 3–1 away victory against Aston Villa in the 2022–23 Premier League. Aged 18 years, 2 months and 4 days, he became the third youngest player to score for Liverpool in the Premier League, behind Michael Owen and Raheem Sterling, and the second youngest Spanish player to score in the Premier League, behind Cesc Fàbregas.

In January 2023, Bajcetic's signed a new long-term contract at Anfield. On the field, he continued to progress, starting three consecutive Premier League games against Chelsea, Wolverhampton Wanderers, and local rivals Everton. On 16 February, he was voted January's Player of the Month by fans. On 21 February, he became the youngest Liverpool player, aged 18 years and 122 days, to start in a Champions League knockout match, which ended in a 5–2 home defeat against Real Madrid.

On 16 March 2023, he announced he would miss the rest of the 2022–23 season with an adductor injury. He returned to training on 6 August 2023.

On 30 August 2024, Bajcetic joined Austrian Bundesliga side Red Bull Salzburg on a season-long loan. After making 19 total appearances, Bajcetic was recalled from Salzburg on 31 January 2025 and sent on a new loan to Las Palmas in La Liga. On 16 February, he scored his first goal for Las Palmas in a 3–1 loss to Mallorca.

On 31 August 2026, Bajcetic completed a permanent return to his boyhood club, Celta Vigo; he signed a three-year deal and was initially assigned to the reserve team in Segunda División.

== Personal life ==
In July 2026, Bajcetic and his partner Evaluna Rodriguez welcomed twins.

== International career ==
Bajcetic is eligible to represent Spain and Serbia at international level. In 2021, he was called up to the Spain U18 team for the Lafarge Foot Avenir tournament by manager Pablo Amo, appearing in all three matches as Spain won the tournament. His time with the youth squad was halted by injury in 2023, amidst an impending U21 call up and rumours of a call from the senior team.

Bajcetic made his debut for the Spain U21s on 8 September 2023, coming on as a substitute in a 6–0 win over Malta.

== Career statistics ==
As of match played 13 May 2025

Appearances and goals by club, season and competition
Club	Season	League			National cup (Note: Includes FA Cup, Austrian Cup)		League cup (Note: Includes EFL Cup)		Europe		Other		Total	
Club	Season	Division	Apps	Goals	Apps	Goals	Apps	Goals	Apps	Goals	Apps	Goals	Apps	Goals
Liverpool U21	2021–22	—			—		—		—		1 (Note: Appearance(s) in EFL Trophy)	0	1	0
Liverpool U21	2022–23	—			—		—		—		2	0	2	0
Liverpool U21	Total		—		—		—		—		3	0	3	0
Liverpool	2022–23	Premier League	11	1	2	0	2	0	4 (Note: Appearances in UEFA Champions League)	0	0	0	19	1
Liverpool	2023–24	Premier League	1	0	0	0	1	0	1 (Note: Appearance in UEFA Europa League)	0	—		3	0
Liverpool	2025–26	Premier League	0	0	0	0	0	0	0	0	0	0	0	0
Liverpool	Total		12	1	2	0	3	0	5	0	0	0	22	1
Red Bull Salzburg (loan)	2024–25	Austrian Bundesliga	12	0	1	0	—		6	0	0	0	19	0
Las Palmas (loan)	2024–25	LaLiga	14	1	—		—		—		—		14	1
Career total			38	2	3	0	3	0	11	0	3	0	58	2

== Honours ==
Liverpool

- EFL Cup: 2023–24
