= Jack Bearne =

English footballer (born 2001)

Personal information
- Full name: Jack William Garrad Bearne
- Date of birth: 15 September 2001 (age 25)
- Place of birth: Nottingham, England
- Position: Winger

Team information
- Current team: Stratford Town

Youth career
- Notts County
- 2017–2023: Liverpool

Senior career*
Years	Team	Apps	(Gls)
2019–2023	Liverpool	0	(0)
2022–2023	→ Kidderminster Harriers (loan)	26	(3)
2023–2024	Greenock Morton	21	(0)
2024–2025	Hednesford Town	40	(9)
2025–2026	Oxford City	26	(3)
2026	Gloucester City	1	(0)
2026–	Stratford Town	0	(0)
- * Club domestic league appearances and goals as of 19:00, 21 August 2026 (UTC)

Jack William Garrad Bearne (born 15 September 2001) is an English footballer who plays as a midfielder for Southern League Premier Division Central club Stratford Town.

== Career ==
Having come through the youth set-up at Notts County, Bearne joined the Liverpool Academy as a youngster. He made his professional debut for Liverpool on 17 December 2019, coming on as a substitute in the away match against Aston Villa in the quarter-finals of the EFL Cup.

On 1 September 2022 he joined Kidderminster Harriers on a season-long loan.

On 15 June 2023, Liverpool announced that they would not extend Bearne's contract. He left the club on 30 June 2023 upon the expiry of his contract.

On 13 July, the winger signed a two-year contract with Scottish Championship club Greenock Morton.

On 23 July 2024, Morton confirmed, that at the player's request, they had terminated Bearne's contract. Three days later, Bearne signed for National League North side Hednesford Town.

On 4 July 2025, Bearne joined National League North side Oxford City. He made his debut on 8 August 2025, against AFC Fylde.

In June 2026, Bearne joined Southern League Premier Division South side Gloucester City. Having made just one appearance for the club, he joined Stratford Town in August 2026.

== Career statistics ==
=== Club ===
As of end of 2024–25 season

Appearances and goals by club, season and competition
Club	Season	League			FA Cup		EFL Cup		Other		Total	
Club	Season	Division	Apps	Goals	Apps	Goals	Apps	Goals	Apps	Goals	Apps	Goals
Liverpool U21	2019–20	—			—		—		1 (Note: Appearance in EFL Trophy)	0	1	0
Liverpool	2019–20	Premier League	0	0	0	0	1	0	—		1	0
Kidderminster Harriers (loan)	2022–23	National League North	26	3	0	0	0	0	—		26	3
Hednesford Town	2024–25	Northern Premier League Division One West	40	9	10	1	—		6 (Note: Two appearances and two goals in FA Trophy, one appearance in Birmingham Senior Cup, one appearance and one goal in Walsall Senior Cup, one appearance in Staffordshire Senior Cup, one appearance and one goal in Northern Premier League Division One West play-offs)	4	56	14
Total			66	12	10	1	1	0	7	4	84	17

== Honours ==
Liverpool Academy

- FA Youth Cup: 2018–19
- Lancashire Senior Cup: 2021–22

Kidderminster Harriers

- National League North play-offs: 2022-23

Hednesford Town

- Northern Premier League Division One West play-offs: 2025
