= Jakub Ojrzyński =

Polish footballer (born 2003)

Personal information
- Full name: Jakub Ojrzyński
- Date of birth: 19 February 2003 (age 23)
- Place of birth: Warsaw, Poland
- Height: 1.96 m (6 ft 5 in)
- Position: Goalkeeper

Team information
- Current team: Örebro SK
- Number: 75

Youth career
- Ajaks Częstochowa
- 2011–2012: GLKS Nadarzyn
- 2012–2016: Korona Kielce
- 2016–2019: Legia Warsaw
- 2019–2021: Liverpool

Senior career*
Years	Team	Apps	(Gls)
2021–2025	Liverpool	0	(0)
2021–2022	→ Caernarfon Town (loan)	28	(0)
2022–2023	→ Radomiak Radom (loan)	1	(0)
2023–2024	→ Den Bosch (loan)	11	(0)
2024	→ Spartakos Kitiou (loan)	0	(0)
2025	→ Utsiktens BK (loan)	5	(0)
2025–	Örebro SK	46	(0)

International career
2017–2018	Poland U15	3	(0)
2018–2019	Poland U16	5	(0)
2019–2020	Poland U17	3	(0)
2021	Poland U19	4	(0)
2022	Poland U20	1	(0)
- * Club domestic league appearances and goals as of 12 November 2026

Jakub Ojrzyński (born 19 February 2003) is a Polish professional footballer who plays as a goalkeeper for Superettan club Örebro SK.

== Career ==
Liverpool signed Ojrzyński from Legia Warsaw in summer 2019 for £200,000 (equivalent to about £256,000 in 2025); he travelled with the first team for their preseason tour of the USA that summer, before linking up with Liverpool's Under 18s and Under 23s teams.

Ojrzyński was on the bench for Liverpool's 2–0 Premier League victory over Sheffield United in February 2021. He signed a new contract with Liverpool in July of that year, before joining Caernarfon Town on loan for the 2021–22 season. Throughout his loan spell, he continued training at Liverpool's Kirkby training complex regularly throughout the season.

On 22 June 2022, he joined Radomiak Radom on loan for the duration of the 2022–23 season. He was recalled on 17 January 2023 after making three first-team appearances for the Polish side.

On 8 August 2023, Ojrzyński was sent on a season-long loan to Eerste Divisie side Den Bosch. He made his Den Bosch debut on 9 September in a 3–1 defeat to SC Cambuur.

On 1 September 2024, he joined Cypriot Second Division club Spartakos Kitiou on loan for the 2024–25 season. He was recalled less than two months into his spell there due to administrative errors from both clubs which led to him not receiving international clearance.

On 27 March 2025, Ojrzyński was sent on loan to Swedish second tier side Utsiktens BK for the remainder of the season. He left Utsiktens and Liverpool at the end of June, upon the expiration of his contract.

On 12 July 2025, Ojrzyński joined Örebro SK on a one-year deal.

== Personal life ==
He is the son of football manager Leszek Ojrzyński.
