= Billy Koumetio =

French footballer (born 2002)

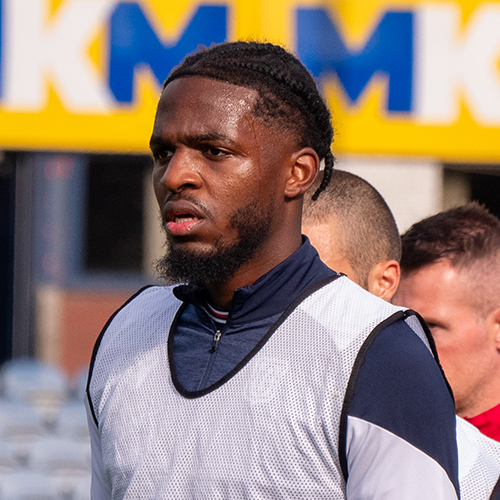
- Koumetio in 2024

Personal information
- Full name: Billy Dawson Koumetio
- Date of birth: 14 November 2002 (age 24)
- Place of birth: Lyon, France
- Height: 1.95 m (6 ft 5 in)
- Positions: Centre-back; left-back

Team information
- Current team: Charlton Athletic
- Number: 12

Youth career
- 2008–2014: Vaulx-en-Velin
- 2014–2018: Lyon
- 2018: Orléans
- 2018–2020: Liverpool

Senior career*
Years	Team	Apps	(Gls)
2020–2024	Liverpool	0	(0)
2022–2023	→ Austria Wien (loan)	5	(0)
2022–2023	→ Austria Wien II (loan)	4	(0)
2023–2024	→ Dunkerque (loan)	8	(0)
2024	→ Blackburn Rovers (loan)	0	(0)
2024–2026	Dundee	40	(0)
2026–	Charlton Athletic	10	(0)

International career
2019	France U18	2	(0)
- * Club domestic league appearances and goals as of 17:10, 21 November 2026 (UTC)

Billy Dawson Koumetio (born 14 November 2002) is a French professional footballer who plays as a centre-back or left-back for EFL Championship club Charlton Athletic.

== Club career ==
=== Liverpool ===
Koumetio moved to Liverpool's Academy from French side US Orléans in November 2018. Koumetio was originally on the books of his hometown club Olympique Lyonnais where he was predominantly a winger at first. His height led to coaching staff turning him into a centre-back when he was 14. Koumetio signed his first professional contract with Liverpool in August 2020, when aged 17 and already 1.91 metres (6 ft 3 in).

He was a ball boy at Anfield for the 4–0 semi-final second leg victory over FC Barcelona in the 2018–19 UEFA Champions League in May 2019. In October 2019 he was named on the bench at the age of 16 for the Carabao Cup tie against Arsenal at Anfield.

Koumetio featured for Liverpool during the pre-season of the 2020–21 football season in friendly matches in Austria against Red Bull Salzburg and VfB Stuttgart. Koumetio made his first-ever appearance for the Reds’ first team on 9 December 2020 substituting in for Fabinho at the heart of defence in the UEFA Champions League against FC Midtjylland. In doing so, he became the youngest player to feature for Liverpool in the Champions League, a record that was later broken by Stefan Bajcetic in 2022.

==== Austria Wien (loan) ====
On 23 June 2022, Koumetio signed for Austrian Bundesliga side Austria Wien on a season-long loan. He was recalled on 10 January 2023.

==== Dunkerque (loan) ====
On 29 August 2023, Koumetio joined Ligue 2 side USL Dunkerque on a season-long loan. He made his debut in a league fixture against Grenoble Foot 38 on 16 September, and was sent off after 52 minutes for two bookable offences. He was recalled on 16 January 2024.

==== Blackburn Rovers (loan) ====
On 1 February 2024, Koumetio joined Blackburn Rovers on loan until the end of the season. He made his debut on 27 February as a substitute in an FA Cup match against Newcastle United.

=== Dundee ===
On 9 August 2024, Koumetio left Liverpool and joined Scottish Premiership club Dundee on a two-year deal. He made his debut from the bench the following day in a league victory at home to Heart of Midlothian. After suffering an ankle injury in December 2024 against St Mirren, Koumetio spent several months recovering and returned as a substitute on 5 April 2025 against the same opponents in a home win.

On 22 July 2025, Koumetio scored his first senior goal in an away win for Dundee against Bonnyrigg Rose in the League Cup. In May 2026 at the end of the season, Dundee triggered Koumetio's one-year extension clause to keep him at the club until 2027.

=== Charlton Athletic ===
On 1 July 2026, Koumetio joined Charlton Athletic on a four-year deal for an undisclosed fee, though reports suggest a fee of around £500,000.

== International career ==
Born in France, Koumetio is of Cameroonian descent. He is a youth international for France at the Under-18 level.

== Personal life ==
Billy Koumetio has a sister, Yzoire, who signed for Liverpool Football Club Women’s Academy in September 2023.

== Career statistics ==
As of match played 21 November 2026

Appearances and goals by club, season and competition
Club	Season	League			National cup (Note: Includes FA Cup, Austrian Cup, Coupe de France, Scottish Cup)		League cup (Note: Includes EFL Cup, Scottish League Cup)		Europe		Other		Total	
Club	Season	Division	Apps	Goals	Apps	Goals	Apps	Goals	Apps	Goals	Apps	Goals	Apps	Goals
Liverpool U21	2019–20	—	—		—		—		—		1 (Note: Appearance(s) in EFL Trophy)	0	1	0
Liverpool U21	2020–21	—	—		—		—		—		1	0	1	0
Liverpool U21	2021–22	—	—		—		—		—		2	0	2	0
Liverpool U21	Total		—		—		—		—		4	0	4	0
Liverpool	2020–21	Premier League	0	0	0	0	0	0	1 (Note: Appearance in UEFA Champions League)	0	0	0	1	0
Liverpool	2021–22	Premier League	0	0	0	0	1	0	0	0	0	0	1	0
Liverpool	Total		0	0	0	0	1	0	1	0	0	0	2	0
Austria Wien (loan)	2022–23	Austrian Bundesliga	5	0	3	0	—		3 (Note: Two appearances in UEFA Europa League, one in UEFA Conference League)	0	—		11	0
Austria Wien II (loan)	2022–23	2. Liga	4	0	—		—		—		—		4	0
Dunkerque (loan)	2023–24	Ligue 2	8	0	1	0	—		—		—		9	0
Blackburn Rovers (loan)	2023–24	Championship	0	0	1	0	—		—		—		1	0
Dundee	2024–25	Scottish Premiership	19	0	0	0	1	0	—		0	0	20	0
Dundee	2025–26	Scottish Premiership	21	0	1	0	2	1	—		0	0	24	1
Dundee	Total		40	0	1	0	3	1	0	0	0	0	44	1
Charlton Athletic	2026–27	Championship	10	0	0	0	2	0	—		—		12	0
Career total			67	0	6	0	6	1	4	0	4	0	87	1
