= 2026–27 Liverpool F.C. season =

English football club season

Liverpool
2026–27 season
- Owner: Fenway Sports Group (62%); 1892 Holdings (38%)
- Chairman: Tom Werner
- Head coach: Andoni Iraola
- Stadium: Anfield
- Premier League: 4th
- FA Cup: Third round
- EFL Cup: Quarter-finals
- UEFA Champions League: League phase
- Top goalscorer: League: Alexander Isak (7); All: Alexander Isak (8)
- Highest home attendance: 60,415 v. Nottingham Forest; Premier League, 29 August 2026
- Lowest home attendance: 59,610 v. Villarreal; UEFA Champions League, 20 October 2026
- Average home league attendance: 60,345
- Biggest win: 4–0 v. Manchester United (H); Premier League, 22 November 2026
- Biggest defeat: 0–3 v. Manchester City (H); Premier League, 11 October 2026
Home colours	Away colours	Third colours

The 2026–27 season is Liverpool Football Club's 135th overall and their 65th consecutive season in the top flight of English football. In addition to the Premier League, the club is also participating in the FA Cup, the EFL Cup, and the UEFA Champions League.

A major change in ownership structure was announced on 14 August 2026, when Fenway Sports Group agreed to sell a 38% stake to 1892 Holdings, a consortium led and managed by Amit Bhatia. The consortium also includes Jeff Bezos, who will not take a seat in the board and is represented by managing partner Bryan Baum, Facebook co-founder Eduardo Saverin and the Mittal family.

== Coaching staff ==
As of 22 November 2026

This season is the first under new head coach Andoni Iraola, who was appointed on a two-year contract on 4 June 2026, succeeding Arne Slot after he departed on 30 May 2026.

Position	Name
Head coach	(Spain) Andoni Iraola
Assistant coach	(Spain) Pablo de la Torre
First-team coach	(England) Tommy Elphick (England) Shaun Cooper
Individual lead coach	(Brazil) Luiz Fernando Iubel
First-team goalkeeping coach	(Spain) Alejandro Rosalen
First-team doctor	(England) Amit Pannu
Director of medicine and performance	(England) Jonathan Power
Head of physical performance	(Northern Ireland) Conall Murtagh
Head of first-team analysis	(Gibraltar) Jansen Moreno

== First-team squad ==
As of 22 November 2026

This season is the first since 2016–17 without Mohamed Salah and Andy Robertson, and the first since 2020–21 without Ibrahima Konaté, all of whom departed the club upon the expiry of their respective contracts. It is also the first season since 2016–17 without Curtis Jones, who departed to Italian side Inter Milan.

No.	Player	Nationality	Position(s)	Date of birth (age)	Signed from	Apps	Goals	Assists
Goalkeepers
1	Alisson Becker (vice-captain)	(Brazil)	GK	2 October 1992 (age 34)	(Italy) Roma	348	1	3
25	Giorgi Mamardashvili	(Georgia (country))	GK	29 September 2000 (age 26)	(Spain) Valencia	22	0	0
28	Freddie Woodman	(England)	GK	4 March 1997 (age 29)	(England) Preston North End	4	0	0
56	Vítězslav Jaroš	(Czech Republic)	GK	23 July 2001 (age 25)	(England) LFC Academy	2	0	0
95	Harvey Davies	(England)	GK	3 September 2003 (age 23)	(England) LFC Academy	0	0	0
Defenders
2	Joe Gomez (vice-captain)	(England)	RB / CB / LB	23 May 1997 (age 29)	(England) Charlton Athletic	283	0	11
4	Virgil van Dijk (captain)	(Netherlands)	CB	8 July 1991 (age 35)	(England) Southampton	390	36	14
5	Jérémy Jacquet	(France)	CB	13 July 2005 (age 21)	(France) Rennes	17	0	0
6	Milos Kerkez	(Hungary)	LB	7 November 2003 (age 23)	(England) Bournemouth	62	2	2
12	Conor Bradley	(Northern Ireland)	RB	9 July 2003 (age 23)	(England) LFC Academy	78	1	12
15	Giovanni Leoni	(Italy)	CB	21 December 2006 (age 19)	(Italy) Parma	1	0	0
21	Kostas Tsimikas	(Greece)	LB	12 May 1996 (age 30)	(Greece) Olympiacos	124	0	21
30	Jeremie Frimpong	(Netherlands)	RWB / RB / RW	10 December 2000 (age 25)	(Germany) Bayer Leverkusen	44	3	3
33	Ronald Araújo	(Uruguay)	CB / RB	7 March 1999 (age 27)	(Spain) Barcelona	16	2	1
44	Luke Chambers	(England)	LB / CB	24 June 2004 (age 22)	(England) LFC Academy	5	0	0
Midfielders
3	Wataru Endo	(Japan)	DM / CB	9 February 1993 (age 33)	(Germany) VfB Stuttgart	87	2	2
7	Florian Wirtz	(Germany)	AM / LM	3 May 2003 (age 23)	(Germany) Bayer Leverkusen	65	10	13
8	Dominik Szoboszlai (vice-captain)	(Hungary)	CM / AM / RB	25 October 2000 (age 26)	(Germany) RB Leipzig	159	32	25
10	Alexis Mac Allister	(Argentina)	CM	24 December 1998 (age 27)	(England) Brighton & Hove Albion	167	24	21
38	Ryan Gravenberch	(Netherlands)	DM / CM	16 May 2002 (age 24)	(Germany) Bayern Munich	149	10	13
42	Trey Nyoni	(England)	DM / CM	30 June 2007 (age 19)	(England) LFC Academy	34	1	1
53	James McConnell	(England)	CM	13 September 2004 (age 22)	(England) LFC Academy	16	0	1
Forwards
9	Alexander Isak	(Sweden)	CF	21 September 1999 (age 27)	(England) Newcastle United	37	12	2
14	Federico Chiesa	(Italy)	RW / CF	25 October 1997 (age 29)	(Italy) Juventus	51	5	4
18	Cody Gakpo	(Netherlands)	LW / RW / CF	7 May 1999 (age 27)	(Netherlands) PSV Eindhoven	192	53	26
22	Hugo Ekitike	(France)	CF	20 June 2002 (age 24)	(Germany) Eintracht Frankfurt	45	17	6
23	Víctor Muñoz	(Spain)	LW / RW / CF	13 July 2003 (age 23)	(Spain) Osasuna	13	3	0
29	Bradley Barcola	(France)	LW / RW	2 September 2002 (age 24)	(France) Paris Saint-Germain	15	3	4
67	Lewis Koumas	(Wales)	CF / LW / RW	19 September 2005 (age 21)	(England) LFC Academy	16	2	1
73	Rio Ngumoha	(England)	LW / RW	29 August 2008 (age 18)	(England) LFC Academy	45	3	4
76	Jayden Danns	(England)	CF	16 January 2006 (age 20)	(England) LFC Academy	10	3	0
Out on loan
19	Harvey Elliott	(England)	AM / RW	4 April 2003 (age 23)	(England) Fulham	149	15	17
41	Ármin Pécsi	(Hungary)	GK	24 February 2005 (age 21)	(Hungary) Puskás Akadémia	0	0	0
47	Calvin Ramsay	(Scotland)	RB	31 July 2003 (age 23)	(Scotland) Aberdeen	4	0	0
83	Ifeanyi Ndukwe	(Austria)	CB	3 March 2008 (age 18)	Austria Wien	0	0	0

=== New contracts ===
Date	Pos.	No.	Player	Date until	Ref.
First team
17 July 2026	MF	8	(Hungary) Dominik Szoboszlai	30 June 2031	
23 July 2026	GK	28	(England) Freddie Woodman	30 June 2029	
Academy
27 May 2026	MF	68	(Northern Ireland) Kieran Morrison	30 June 2030	
11 June 2026	DF	85	(Wales) Prince Cissé	30 June 2029 (Note: First professional contract.)	
16 July 2026	MF	81	(England) Oliver O'Connor	Undisclosed	
1 August 2026	MF	—	(England) La'more Lee Forrester	Undisclosed	
13 August 2026	DF	—	(England) Lucas Clarke	30 June 2028	
15 August 2026	DF	48	(England) Calum Scanlon	Undisclosed	
8 September 2026	MF	—	(England) Haydn Murray-Holme	Undisclosed	
18 September 2026	MF	—	(England) Erik Farkas	Undisclosed	
22 September 2026	GK	90	(England) Matty Wright	Undisclosed	
13 October 2026	DF	—	(Scotland) Cam Williams	Undisclosed	

== Transfers ==
=== In ===
Date	Pos.	No.	Player	From	Fee	Ref.
First team
1 July 2026 (Note: The transfer was completed on 2 February 2026, both clubs agreed that Jacquet would join at the start of the 2026–27 season.)	DF	5	(France) Jérémy Jacquet	(France) Rennes	£55,000,000 (Note: Fee may eventually rise to £60,000,000.)	
1 July 2026 (Note: The transfer was completed on 18 June 2026, both clubs agreed that Muñoz would join at the start of the 2026–27 season.)	FW	23	(Spain) Víctor Muñoz	(Spain) Osasuna	£34,500,000	
1 July 2026 (Note: The transfer was completed on 26 January 2026, both clubs agreed that Ndukwe would join at the start of the 2026–27 season.)	DF	83	(Austria) Ifeanyi Ndukwe	Austria Wien	£2,600,000	
31 August 2026	FW	29	(France) Bradley Barcola	(France) Paris Saint-Germain	£106,000,000 (Note: Fee may eventually rise to £123,000,000.)	
1 January 2027 (Note: The transfer was completed on 4 September 2026, both clubs agreed that N'Guessan would join in January 2027, spending the rest of the season on loan at Brest.)	FW	—	(France) Djylian N'Guessan	(France) Saint-Étienne	£4,300,000	
Academy
15 September 2026	MF	69	(Hungary) Patrik Farkas	(England) Blackburn Rovers	Free transfer	
▼ Spending: £202,400,000 + Undisclosed fees

Note^{1}: On 21 July 2026, Liverpool completed a transfer for midfielder Samuel Martínez from Atlético Nacional for a reported fee of £750,000. Both clubs confirmed that the Colombian youth international would be joining the Premier League club at the start of the 2027–28 season.

Note^{2}: On 1 September 2026, Liverpool completed a transfer for goalkeeper Lucca Brughmans from Genk for a reported fee of £28,300,000 plus £1,700,000 in potential add-ons. Both clubs confirmed that the Belgian youth international would be joining the Premier League club at the start of the 2027–28 season.

=== Out ===
Date	Pos.	No.	Player	To	Fee	Ref.
First team
1 July 2026	DF	5	(France) Ibrahima Konaté	(Spain) Real Madrid	Free transfer	
1 July 2026	FW	11	(Egypt) Mohamed Salah	(Turkey) Trabzonspor	Free transfer	
1 July 2026	DF	26	(Scotland) Andy Robertson	(England) Tottenham Hotspur	Free transfer	
1 July 2026	DF	46	(England) Rhys Williams	Free agent	Free transfer	
21 August 2026	MF	17	(England) Curtis Jones	(Italy) Inter Milan	£25,700,000 (Note: Fee may eventually rise to £30,000,000.)	
31 August 2026	MF	43	(Spain) Stefan Bajcetic	(Spain) Celta Fortuna	£1,000,000 (Note: Fee may eventually rise to £1,300,000.)	
Academy
1 July 2026	DF	57	(England) Carter Pinnington	(England) West Bromwich Albion	Undisclosed	
1 July 2026	DF	59	(Wales) Terence Miles	(England) Lower Breck	Free transfer	
1 July 2026	DF	69	(England) Josh Davidson	(England) Burscough	Free transfer	
1 July 2026	FW	81	(Egypt) Kareem Ahmed	(United States) Pittburgh Panthers	Free transfer	
1 July 2026	MF	85	(England) James Balagizi	Free agent	Free transfer	
1 July 2026	FW	87	(England) Oakley Cannonier	(Singapore) Hougang United	Free transfer	
1 July 2026	DF	90	(England) Emmanuel Airoboma	(England) Burnley	Free transfer	
1 July 2026	GK	—	(England) DJ Bernard	(England) Middlesbrough	Free transfer	
1 July 2026	GK	—	(England) Jacob Poytress	(England) Bury	Free transfer	
2 July 2026	MF	91	(England) Luca Stephenson	(England) Bolton Wanderers	£700,000	
29 July 2026	MF	70	(England) Tommy Pilling	(Slovakia) Zemplín Michalovce	Undisclosed	
▲ Income: £27,400,000 + Undisclosed fees

=== Loans in ===
Date	Pos.	No.	Player	From	Date until	Ref.
First team
10 August 2026	DF	33	(Uruguay) Ronald Araújo	(Spain) Barcelona	30 June 2027 (Note: With an option to buy for £47,100,000.)	

=== Loans out ===
Date	Pos.	No.	Player	To	Date until	Ref.
First team
23 July 2026	GK	41	(Hungary) Ármin Pécsi	(Austria) TSV Hartberg	30 June 2027	
22 August 2026	DF	83	(Austria) Ifeanyi Ndukwe	(Spain) Levante	30 June 2027	
25 August 2026	DF	47	(Scotland) Calvin Ramsay	(Scotland) St Mirren	31 May 2027	
1 September 2026	MF	19	(England) Harvey Elliott	(Spain) Valencia	30 June 2027	
1 January 2027 (Note: The transfer was completed on 4 September 2026, both clubs agreed that N'Guessan would join in January 2027, spending the rest of the season on loan at Brest.)	FW	—	(France) Djylian N'Guessan	(France) Brest	30 June 2027	
Academy
22 July 2026	MF	61	(Saint Kitts and Nevis) Kyle Kelly	(England) Forest Green Rovers	4 January 2027	
24 July 2026	DF	65	(England) Amara Nallo	(Finland) HJK	6 October 2026 (Note: Loan was initially scheduled to end on 31 December 2026, but on 6 October 2026, Nallo returned from HJK due to injury.)	
15 August 2026	DF	48	(England) Calum Scanlon	(Wales) Cardiff City	31 May 2027	
20 August 2026	MF	68	(Northern Ireland) Kieran Morrison	(England) Sheffield Wednesday	31 May 2027	
28 August 2026	GK	74	(Poland) Kornel Miściur	(England) Leek Town	2 January 2027	
1 September 2026	FW	64	(Honduras) Keyrol Figueroa	(England) Port Vale	31 May 2027	

== Pre-season and friendlies ==
On 4 March 2026, Liverpool announced a pre-season tour in the United States visiting Nashville, New York City and Chicago, playing against Sunderland, Wrexham and Leeds United respectively. On 2 June 2026, two further friendlies against Monaco and Como were announced, to conclude Liverpool's pre-season programme. An extra behind-closed-doors friendly against Como was later confirmed on 22 July 2026.

Win Draw Loss Fixtures

25 July 2026 Friendly	Liverpool	4–2	Sunderland	Nashville, United States
17:00 CDT	Morrison 13'; Szoboszlai 56'; Chiesa 72'; Koumas 85'	Report	Ballard (yellow card) 20'; Le Fée 28'; Tutyerov 49'	Stadium: Geodis Park; Attendance: 24,897; Referee: Robert Vincze (United States)

29 July 2026 Friendly	Liverpool	1–0	Wrexham	New York City, United States
19:30 EDT	Ngumoha 75'	Report		Stadium: Yankee Stadium; Attendance: 42,204; Referee: Lorenzo Hernandez (United States)

2 August 2026 Friendly	Liverpool	2–4	Leeds United	Chicago, United States
15:00 CDT	Chambers 7'; Wirtz 40'	Report	Tanaka (yellow card) 24'; Aaronson 60', (yellow card) 88'; Calvert-Lewin 71', 85'; Longstaff 73'	Stadium: Soldier Field; Attendance: 49,128; Referee: Alexis Da Silva (United States)

9 August 2026 Friendly	Liverpool	2–3	Monaco	Liverpool, England
14:30 BST	Isak 16'; Wirtz 29'	Report	Golovin 44' (pen.); Biereth 56'; Brunner 88'; Konaté (yellow card) 90'	Stadium: Anfield; Attendance: 60,216; Referee: Jarred Gillett (England)

16 August 2026 BCD Friendly	Liverpool	0–0	Como	Kirkby, England
11:30 BST		Report		Stadium: Liverpool Training Centre; Attendance: 0 (behind closed doors)
Note: Two 35-minute halves game

16 August 2026 Friendly	Liverpool	2–0	Como	Liverpool, England
18:00 BST	Gakpo 23'; Jacquet 44'; Koumas (yellow card) 68'; Szoboszlai (yellow card) 71'	Report	Couto (yellow card) 71'	Stadium: Anfield; Attendance: 59,800; Referee: Robert Jones (England)

== Competitions ==
=== Overall record ===
Competition	First match	Last match	Starting round	Record							
Competition	First match	Last match	Starting round	Pld	W	D	L	GF	GA	GD	Win %
Premier League	23 August 2026	30 May 2027	Matchday 1	11	6	3	2	18	10	+8	54.55
FA Cup	8–11 January 2027	TBD	Third round	0	0	0	0	0	0	+0	—
EFL Cup	15 September 2026	TBD	Third round	2	1	1	0	4	2	+2	50.00
UEFA Champions League	9 September 2026	TBD	League phase	4	3	0	1	14	10	+4	75.00
Total				17	10	4	3	36	22	+14	58.82

Last updated: 8 November 2026
Source: Soccerway

=== Premier League ===
==== League table ====
Pos	Team	Pld	W	D	L	GF	GA	GD	Pts	Qualification or relegation
2	Brighton & Hove Albion	11	7	1	3	26	9	+17	22	Qualification for the Champions League league phase
3	Manchester City	11	7	1	3	22	14	+8	22	Qualification for the Champions League league phase
4	Liverpool	11	6	3	2	18	10	+8	21	Qualification for the Champions League league phase
5	Bournemouth	11	5	3	3	18	14	+4	18	Qualification for the Europa League league phase (Note: The winners of the 2026–27 FA Cup and the 5th-placed team both qualify for the Europa League. If the FA Cup winners finish in the top five, the 6th-placed team will qualify. If England are one of the two associations with the highest UEFA coefficient points, 5th place will qualify for the Champions League and the other qualifying spots will move down one position.)
6	Leeds United	11	4	5	2	14	9	+5	17	

Updated to match(es) played on 22 November 2026. Source: Premier League
Rules for classification: 1) Points; 2) Goal difference; 3) Goals scored; 4) If the champions, relegated teams or qualified teams for UEFA competitions cannot be determined by rules 1 to 3 following the completion of the competition, rules 4.1 to 4.3 are applied between such teams – 4.1) Head-to-head points; 4.2) Head-to-head away goals; 4.3) Play-off at a neutral site.

==== Results summary ====
Overall								Home						Away					
Pld	W	D	L	GF	GA	GD	Pts	W	D	L	GF	GA	GD	W	D	L	GF	GA	GD
11	6	3	2	18	10	+8	21	2	2	2	8	6	+2	4	1	0	10	4	+6

Last updated: 22 November 2026.
Source: Soccerway

==== Results by round ====
Round	1	2	3	4	5	6	7	8	9	10	11	12	13	14	15	16	17	18	19	20	21	22	23	24	25	26	27	28	29	30	31	32	33	34	35	36	37	38	39
Ground	A	H	A	H	A	H	A	H	H	A	H	A	H	A	H	H	A	A	H	A	H	A	H	A	A	H	A	H	H	A	H	A	A	H	A	H	A	H	A
Result	D	D	W	D	W	L	W	W	L	W	W																												
Position	10	13	6	8	6	9	5	4	5	4	4																												
Points	1	2	5	6	9	9	12	15	15	18	21																												

Updated to match(es) played on 22 November 2026. Source: Premier League
A = Away; H = Home; W = Win; D = Draw; L = Loss; P = Postponed

==== Matches ====
The Premier League fixtures were released on 19 June 2026.

Win Draw Loss Fixtures

23 August 2026 1	Newcastle United	2–2	Liverpool	Newcastle upon Tyne
16:30 BST	Elanga 5'; Wissa (yellow card) 25'; Miley (yellow card) 34'; Willock 57'; Ramsey (yellow card) 64'; Murphy (yellow card) 79'; Horníček (yellow card) 90+3'	Report	Kerkez (yellow card) 30'; Frimpong (yellow card) 30'; Gakpo 55'; Van Dijk (yellow card) 90'; Szoboszlai 90+9' (pen.)	Stadium: St James' Park; Attendance: 52,630; Referee: Stuart Attwell

29 August 2026 2	Liverpool	2–2	Nottingham Forest	Liverpool
12:30 BST	Muñoz (yellow card) 54', (goal) 82'; Wirtz (yellow card) 59'; Isak 60'; Alisson (yellow card) 69'; Araújo (yellow card) 79'	Report	Ndoye 24'; Igor Jesus (yellow card) 44'; Aina (yellow card) 50'; Gibbs-White 70' (pen.)	Stadium: Anfield; Attendance: 60,415; Referee: Sam Barrott
Note: Fixture was initially scheduled for a 15:00 kick-off, but was moved for live TNT Sports broadcast.

4 September 2026 3	Ipswich Town	0–2	Liverpool	Ipswich
20:00 BST	Enciso (yellow card) 41'	Report	Isak 6', 9'; Mac Allister (yellow card) 10'; Jacquet (yellow card) 52'; Kerkez (yellow card) 57'	Stadium: Portman Road; Attendance: 30,019; Referee: Darren England
Note: Fixture was initially scheduled for 5 September, but was moved for live Sky Sports broadcast.

12 September 2026 4	Liverpool	0–0	Fulham	Liverpool
15:00 BST		Report	Tete (yellow card) 81'	Stadium: Anfield; Attendance: 60,160; Referee: Thomas Bramall

20 September 2026 5	Bournemouth	0–1	Liverpool	Bournemouth
14:00 BST	Silva (yellow card) 81'	Report	Szoboszlai (yellow card) 46'; Isak 57', (yellow card) 58'	Stadium: Dean Court; Attendance: 11,316; Referee: Michael Oliver
Note: Fixture was initially scheduled for 19 September, but was moved for live Sky Sports broadcast.

11 October 2026 6	Liverpool	0–3	Manchester City	Liverpool
16:30 BST	Araújo (yellow card) 8'; Gravenberch (yellow card) 47' (yellow-red card) 62'; Van Dijk (yellow card) 90+1'	Report	O'Reilly (yellow card) 58'; Haaland 65'; Doku 68'; Cherki 78'; Bouaddi (yellow card) 86'	Stadium: Anfield; Attendance: 60,338; Referee: Chris Kavanagh
Note: Fixture was initially scheduled for 10 October, but was moved for live Sky Sports broadcast.

17 October 2026 7	Brentford	1–2	Liverpool	Brentford
15:00 BST	Lewis-Potter 44'; Yarmolyuk (red card) 45+8'; Thiago (yellow card) 46'; Schade (yellow card) 60'; Janelt (yellow card) 63' (yellow-red card) 90+2'	Report	Barcola (yellow card) 31'; Jacquet (yellow card) 49'; Mac Allister (yellow card) 53'; Muñoz 62'; Isak 70'	Stadium: Brentford Community Stadium; Attendance: 17,232; Referee: John Brooks

25 October 2026 8	Liverpool	2–0	Brighton & Hove Albion	Liverpool
14:00 GMT	Groß 17' (o.g.); Isak 21'	Report	Boscagli (yellow card) 45+3'; Costinha (yellow card) 73'	Stadium: Anfield; Attendance: 60,404; Referee: Sam Barrott
Note: Fixture was initially scheduled for 24 October, but was moved due to Brighton's participation in the UEFA Conference League league phase on the preceding Thursday.

1 November 2026 9	Liverpool	0–1	Arsenal	Liverpool
16:30 GMT	Barcola (yellow card) 45+3'; Kerkez (yellow card) 67'; Mac Allister (yellow card) 80'; Van Dijk (yellow card) 90+7'	Report	Havertz 16'; Madueke (yellow card) 55'; Lewis-Skelly (yellow card) 72'; Timber (yellow card) 80'; Raya (yellow card) 90+3'	Stadium: Anfield; Attendance: 60,406; Referee: Andy Madley
Note: Fixture was initially scheduled for 31 October, but was moved for live Sky Sports broadcast.

8 November 2026 10	Crystal Palace	1–3	Liverpool	Selhurst
14:00 GMT	Pino (yellow card) 71'; Lerma (yellow card) 82'; Nketiah 90+5' (pen.)	Report	Araújo (yellow card) 24'; Mac Allister 40', (yellow card) 83'; Wirtz 54'; Barcola (yellow card) 59'; Muñoz (yellow card) 82'; Isak 89'	Stadium: Selhurst Park; Attendance: 25,176; Referee: Tony Harrington
Note: Fixture was initially scheduled for 7 November, but was moved for live Sky Sports broadcast.

22 November 2026 11	Liverpool	4–0	Manchester United	Liverpool
16:30 GMT	Szoboszlai 10'; Wirtz 13'; Barcola (yellow card) 62'; Ngumoha 66'; Muñoz 82'	Report	Yoro (red card) 8'	Stadium: Anfield; Attendance: 60,343; Referee: Sam Barrott
Note: Fixture was initially scheduled for 21 November, but was moved for live Sky Sports broadcast.

29 November 2026 12	Everton	v	Liverpool	Liverpool
12:00 GMT		Report		Stadium: Hill Dickinson Stadium
Note: Fixture was initially scheduled for 28 November, but was moved for live TNT Sports broadcast.

2 December 2026 13	Liverpool	v	Sunderland	Liverpool
19:30 GMT		Report		Stadium: Anfield
Note: Fixture was initially scheduled for a 20:00 kick-off, but was moved for live Sky Sports broadcast.

5 December 2026 14	Chelsea	v	Liverpool	Fulham
12:30 GMT		Report		Stadium: Stamford Bridge
Note: Fixture was initially scheduled for a 15:00 kick-off, but was moved for live TNT Sports broadcast.

12 December 2026 15	Liverpool	v	Leeds United	Liverpool
15:00 GMT		Report		Stadium: Anfield

19 December 2026 16	Liverpool	v	Tottenham Hotspur	Liverpool
17:30 GMT		Report		Stadium: Anfield
Note: Fixture was initially scheduled for a 15:00 kick-off, but was moved for live Sky Sports broadcast.

26 December 2026 17	Hull City	v	Liverpool	Kingston upon Hull
17:30 GMT		Report		Stadium: MKM Stadium
Note: Fixture was initially scheduled for a 15:00 kick-off, but was moved for live Sky Sports broadcast.

30 December 2026 18	Aston Villa	v	Liverpool	Birmingham
20:15 GMT		Report		Stadium: Villa Park
Note: Fixture was initially scheduled for a 20:00 kick-off, but was moved for live Sky Sports broadcast.

2 January 2027 19	Liverpool	v	Coventry City	Liverpool
15:00 GMT		Report		Stadium: Anfield

5 January 2027 20	Sunderland	v	Liverpool	Sunderland
20:15 GMT		Report		Stadium: Stadium of Light
Note: Fixture was initially scheduled for 6 January, but was moved for live Sky Sports broadcast.

16 January 2027 21	Liverpool	v	Crystal Palace	Liverpool
15:00 GMT		Report		Stadium: Anfield

24 January 2027 22	Manchester United	v	Liverpool	Trafford
16:30 GMT		Report		Stadium: Old Trafford
Note: Fixture was initially scheduled for 23 January, but was moved for live Sky Sports broadcast.

30 January 2027 23	Liverpool	v	Everton	Liverpool
12:30 GMT		Report		Stadium: Anfield
Note: Fixture was initially scheduled for a 15:00 kick-off, but was moved for live TNT Sports broadcast.

6 February 2027 24	Arsenal	v	Liverpool	Holloway
15:00 GMT		Report		Stadium: Emirates Stadium

10 February 2027 25	Coventry City	v	Liverpool	Coventry
20:00 GMT		Report		Stadium: Coventry Building Society Arena

20 February 2027 26	Liverpool	v	Hull City	Liverpool
15:00 GMT		Report		Stadium: Anfield

27 February 2027 27	Tottenham Hotspur	v	Liverpool	Tottenham
15:00 GMT		Report		Stadium: Tottenham Hotspur Stadium

3 March 2027 28	Liverpool	v	Aston Villa	Liverpool
20:00 GMT		Report		Stadium: Anfield

13 March 2027 29	Liverpool	v	Ipswich Town	Liverpool
15:00 GMT		Report		Stadium: Anfield

20 March 2027 30	Fulham	v	Liverpool	Fulham
15:00 GMT		Report		Stadium: Craven Cottage

10 April 2027 31	Liverpool	v	Newcastle United	Liverpool
15:00 BST		Report		Stadium: Anfield

17 April 2027 32	Nottingham Forest	v	Liverpool	West Bridgford
15:00 BST		Report		Stadium: City Ground

24 April 2027 33	Leeds United	v	Liverpool	Leeds
15:00 BST		Report		Stadium: Elland Road

1 May 2027 34	Liverpool	v	Chelsea	Liverpool
15:00 BST		Report		Stadium: Anfield

8 May 2027 35	Manchester City	v	Liverpool	Manchester
15:00 BST		Report		Stadium: Etihad Stadium

15 May 2027 36	Liverpool	v	Brentford	Liverpool
15:00 BST		Report		Stadium: Anfield

23 May 2027 37	Brighton & Hove Albion	v	Liverpool	Brighton and Hove
15:00 BST		Report		Stadium: Falmer Stadium

30 May 2027 38	Liverpool	v	Bournemouth	Liverpool
16:00 BST		Report		Stadium: Anfield

=== FA Cup ===
As a Premier League side, Liverpool will enter the FA Cup in the third round in January 2027.

Win Draw Loss Fixtures

8–11 January 2027 Third round	TBD	v	TBD	TBD
15:00 GMT		Report		Stadium: TBD

=== EFL Cup ===
As one of the Premier League clubs participating in European competitions, Liverpool entered the EFL Cup in the third round, and were drawn at home against Premier League side Tottenham Hotspur. They were drawn at home to Premier League rivals Chelsea in the fourth round, and at home to Premier League club Bournemouth in the quarter-finals.

Win Draw Loss Fixtures

15 September 2026 Third round	Liverpool	3–1	Tottenham Hotspur	Liverpool
20:00 BST	Mac Allister 21'; Araújo (yellow card) 36'; Frimpong (yellow card) 40'; Gakpo 54'; Kerkez (yellow card) 75'; Szoboszlai 90+1'	Report	Marmoush (yellow card) 41'; Bentancur (yellow card) 45+3'; Gallagher 69'	Stadium: Anfield; Attendance: 60,169; Referee: Andy Madley
Note: Fixture was initially scheduled for 16 September, but was moved due to scheduling clashes.

28 October 2026 Fourth round	Liverpool	1–1 (6–5 p)	Chelsea	Liverpool
20:00 GMT	Koumas (yellow card) 11'; McConnell (yellow card) 21'; Gakpo 43' (pen.)	Report	Rogers 40' (pen.); Acheampong (yellow card) 50'; Lavia (yellow card) 73'	Stadium: Anfield; Attendance: 60,214; Referee: Darren England
	Penalties
	Mac Allister (penalty scored); Isak (penalty scored); Gakpo (penalty scored); Wirtz (penalty scored); Tsimikas (penalty missed); Barcola (penalty scored); Gravenberch (penalty missed); Gomez (penalty scored)		(penalty scored) Neto; (penalty scored) Rogers; (penalty scored) Lavia; (penalty missed) Barco; (penalty scored) Henderson; (penalty scored) Colwill; (penalty missed) Emegha; (penalty missed) Fofana

16 December 2026 Quarter-finals	Liverpool	v	Bournemouth	Liverpool
20:00 GMT		Report		Stadium: Anfield

=== UEFA Champions League ===
As the fifth-placed team in the 2025–26 Premier League, Liverpool entered the UEFA Champions League in the league phase.

==== League phase ====
The league phase draw was held on 27 August 2026. Liverpool were drawn at home against Atlético Madrid, Porto, Villarreal, Lens, and away to Inter Milan, Club Brugge, Fenerbahçe and LASK.

Pos	Team	Pld	W	D	L	GF	GA	GD	Pts	Qualification
6	(England) Aston Villa	4	3	0	1	12	6	+6	9	Advance to round of 16 (seeded)
7	(England) Manchester City	4	3	0	1	12	7	+5	9	Advance to round of 16 (seeded)
8	(England) Liverpool	4	3	0	1	14	10	+4	9	Advance to round of 16 (seeded)
9	(Belgium) Club Brugge	4	3	0	1	11	7	+4	9	Advance to knockout phase play-offs (seeded)
10	(Portugal) Sporting CP	4	3	0	1	8	4	+4	9	Advance to knockout phase play-offs (seeded)

Updated to match(es) played on 4 November 2026. Source: UEFA
Rules for classification: League phase tiebreakers

Round	1	2	3	4	5	6	7	8
Ground	H	A	H	A	A	H	A	H
Result	W	W	W	L				
Position	13	5	3	8				
Points	3	6	9	9				

Updated to match(es) played on 4 November 2026. Source: UEFA
A = Away; H = Home; W = Win; D = Draw; L = Loss

Win Draw Loss Fixtures

9 September 2026 1	Liverpool (England)	2–1	(Spain) Atlético Madrid	Liverpool, England
20:00 BST	Mac Allister (yellow card) 28', (goal) 50'; Szoboszlai 40'	Report	Llorente 17'; Pubill (yellow card) 52'	Stadium: Anfield; Attendance: 59,870; Referee: Davide Massa (Italy)

14 October 2026 2	LASK (Austria)	3–6	(England) Liverpool	Linz, Austria
18:45 CEST	Ljubičić 63'; Flecker 74', 77'; Elfadli (yellow card) 80'	Report	Araújo 22'; Barcola 24', 37', 66'; Frimpong 51'; Koumas 72'	Stadium: Raiffeisen Arena; Attendance: 18,910; Referee: Tobias Stieler (Germany)

20 October 2026 3	Liverpool (England)	4–3	(Spain) Villarreal	Liverpool, England
20:00 BST	Mac Allister 36', 65'; Araújo 45+2'; Wirtz 69'	Report	Mikautadze 4'; Moleiro (yellow card) 27'; Cardona 29'; Mouriño (yellow card) 41'; Oluwaseyi 87'	Stadium: Anfield; Attendance: 59,610; Referee: Szymon Marciniak (Poland)

4 November 2026 4	Fenerbahçe (Turkey)	3–2	(England) Liverpool	Istanbul, Turkey
20:45 TRT	Brown (yellow card) 25', (goal) 73'; Greenwood 29'; Muriqi 79'	Report	Nyoni 25'; Isak 69'; Mac Allister (yellow card) 85'	Stadium: Şükrü Saracoğlu Stadium; Attendance: 39,536; Referee: Clément Turpin (France)

25 November 2026 5	Club Brugge (Belgium)	v	(England) Liverpool	Bruges, Belgium
21:00 CET		Report		Stadium: Jan Breydel Stadium

9 December 2026 6	Liverpool (England)	v	(Portugal) Porto	Liverpool, England
20:00 GMT		Report		Stadium: Anfield

19 January 2027 7	Inter Milan (Italy)	v	(England) Liverpool	Milan, Italy
21:00 CET		Report		Stadium: San Siro

27 January 2027 8	Liverpool (England)	v	(France) Lens	Liverpool, England
20:00 GMT		Report		Stadium: Anfield

== Statistics ==
As of match played 22 November 2026

=== Appearances ===
No.	Pos	Nat	Player	Total		Premier League		FA Cup		EFL Cup		Champions League	
No.	Pos	Nat	Player	Apps	Goals	Apps	Goals	Apps	Goals	Apps	Goals	Apps	Goals
1	GK	(Brazil) BRA	Alisson Becker	15	0	11+0	0	0+0	0	0+0	0	4+0	0
2	DF	(England) ENG	Joe Gomez	9	0	0+4	0	0+0	0	2+0	0	1+2	0
3	MF	(Japan) JPN	Wataru Endo	0	0	0+0	0	0+0	0	0+0	0	0+0	0
4	DF	(Netherlands) NED	Virgil van Dijk	16	0	11+0	0	0+0	0	1+0	0	3+1	0
5	DF	(France) FRA	Jérémy Jacquet	17	0	11+0	0	0+0	0	0+2	0	4+0	0
6	DF	(Hungary) HUN	Milos Kerkez	14	0	10+1	0	0+0	0	1+0	0	1+1	0
7	MF	(Germany) GER	Florian Wirtz	16	3	11+0	2	0+0	0	0+1	0	2+2	1
8	MF	(Hungary) HUN	Dominik Szoboszlai	12	4	8+1	2	0+0	0	0+1	1	2+0	1
9	FW	(Sweden) SWE	Alexander Isak	15	8	10+0	7	0+0	0	0+2	0	1+2	1
10	MF	(Argentina) ARG	Alexis Mac Allister	17	5	9+2	1	0+0	0	1+1	1	3+1	3
12	DF	(Northern Ireland) NIR	Conor Bradley	0	0	0+0	0	0+0	0	0+0	0	0+0	0
14	FW	(Italy) ITA	Federico Chiesa	1	0	0+1	0	0+0	0	0+0	0	0+0	0
15	DF	(Italy) ITA	Giovanni Leoni	0	0	0+0	0	0+0	0	0+0	0	0+0	0
18	FW	(Netherlands) NED	Cody Gakpo	12	3	7+1	1	0+0	0	2+0	2	1+1	0
21	DF	(Greece) GRE	Kostas Tsimikas	9	0	1+3	0	0+0	0	1+0	0	3+1	0
22	FW	(France) FRA	Hugo Ekitike	0	0	0+0	0	0+0	0	0+0	0	0+0	0
23	FW	(Spain) ESP	Víctor Muñoz	13	3	6+4	3	0+0	0	0+0	0	1+2	0
25	GK	(Georgia (country)) GEO	Giorgi Mamardashvili	2	0	0+0	0	0+0	0	2+0	0	0+0	0
28	GK	(England) ENG	Freddie Woodman	0	0	0+0	0	0+0	0	0+0	0	0+0	0
29	FW	(France) FRA	Bradley Barcola	15	3	8+1	0	0+0	0	0+2	0	3+1	3
30	DF	(Netherlands) NED	Jeremie Frimpong	9	1	2+4	0	0+0	0	1+0	0	1+1	1
33	DF	(Uruguay) URU	Ronald Araújo	15	2	8+2	0	0+0	0	2+0	0	3+0	2
38	MF	(Netherlands) NED	Ryan Gravenberch	12	0	4+3	0	0+0	0	1+1	0	2+1	0
42	MF	(England) ENG	Trey Nyoni	14	1	1+8	0	0+0	0	2+0	0	3+0	1
44	DF	(England) ENG	Luke Chambers	1	0	0+0	0	0+0	0	0+0	0	0+1	0
53	MF	(England) ENG	James McConnell	3	0	0+0	0	0+0	0	2+0	0	0+1	0
56	GK	(Czech Republic) CZE	Vítězslav Jaroš	0	0	0+0	0	0+0	0	0+0	0	0+0	0
67	FW	(Wales) WAL	Lewis Koumas	15	1	1+8	0	0+0	0	2+0	0	2+2	1
73	FW	(England) ENG	Rio Ngumoha	15	0	2+7	0	0+0	0	2+0	0	4+0	0
76	FW	(England) ENG	Jayden Danns	0	0	0+0	0	0+0	0	0+0	0	0+0	0
95	GK	(England) ENG	Harvey Davies	0	0	0+0	0	0+0	0	0+0	0	0+0	0

=== Goals ===
Rank	No.	Pos.	Player	Premier League	FA Cup	EFL Cup	Champions League	Total
1	9	FW	(Sweden) Alexander Isak	7	0	0	1	8
2	10	MF	(Argentina) Alexis Mac Allister	1	0	1	3	5
3	8	MF	(Hungary) Dominik Szoboszlai	1	0	1	1	3
3	18	FW	(Netherlands) Cody Gakpo	1	0	2	0	3
3	29	FW	(France) Bradley Barcola	0	0	0	3	3
6	7	MF	(Germany) Florian Wirtz	2	0	0	1	3
6	23	FW	(Spain) Víctor Muñoz	3	0	0	0	3
6	33	DF	(Uruguay) Ronald Araújo	0	0	0	2	2
9	30	DF	(Netherlands) Jeremie Frimpong	0	0	0	1	1
9	42	MF	(England) Trey Nyoni	0	0	0	1	1
9	67	FW	(Wales) Lewis Koumas	0	0	0	1	1
Own goals				1	0	0	0	1
Total				15	0	4	14	33

=== Clean sheets ===
Rank	No.	Player	Premier League	FA Cup	EFL Cup	Champions League	Total
1	1	(Brazil) Alisson Becker	5	0	0	0	5
Total			5	0	0	0	5

=== Disciplinary record ===
No.	Pos.	Player	Premier League			FA Cup			EFL Cup			Champions League			Total		
No.	Pos.	Player	Yellow card	(yellow card) (yellow-red card)	Red card	Yellow card	(yellow card) (yellow-red card)	Red card	Yellow card	(yellow card) (yellow-red card)	Red card	Yellow card	(yellow card) (yellow-red card)	Red card	Yellow card	(yellow card) (yellow-red card)	Red card
1	GK	(Brazil) Alisson Becker	1	0	0	0	0	0	0	0	0	0	0	0	1	0	0
4	DF	(Netherlands) Virgil van Dijk	3	0	0	0	0	0	0	0	0	0	0	0	3	0	0
5	DF	(France) Jérémy Jacquet	2	0	0	0	0	0	0	0	0	0	0	0	2	0	0
6	DF	(Hungary) Milos Kerkez	3	0	0	0	0	0	1	0	0	0	0	0	4	0	0
7	MF	(Germany) Florian Wirtz	1	0	0	0	0	0	0	0	0	0	0	0	1	0	0
8	MF	(Hungary) Dominik Szoboszlai	1	0	0	0	0	0	0	0	0	0	0	0	1	0	0
9	FW	(Sweden) Alexander Isak	1	0	0	0	0	0	0	0	0	0	0	0	1	0	0
10	MF	(Argentina) Alexis Mac Allister	4	0	0	0	0	0	0	0	0	2	0	0	6	0	0
23	FW	(Spain) Víctor Muñoz	2	0	0	0	0	0	0	0	0	0	0	0	2	0	0
29	FW	(France) Bradley Barcola	3	0	0	0	0	0	0	0	0	0	0	0	3	0	0
30	DF	(Netherlands) Jeremie Frimpong	1	0	0	0	0	0	1	0	0	0	0	0	2	0	0
33	DF	(Uruguay) Ronald Araújo	3	0	0	0	0	0	1	0	0	0	0	0	4	0	0
38	MF	(Netherlands) Ryan Gravenberch	0	1	0	0	0	0	0	0	0	0	0	0	0	1	0
53	MF	(England) James McConnell	0	0	0	0	0	0	1	0	0	0	0	0	1	0	0
67	FW	(Wales) Lewis Koumas	0	0	0	0	0	0	1	0	0	0	0	0	1	0	0
Total			25	1	0	0	0	0	5	0	0	2	0	0	32	1	0

== Awards ==
=== Player Awards ===
==== Liverpool Player of the Month ====
Awarded monthly to the player that was chosen by fans voting on liverpoolfc.com

Month	Player	Ref.
August / September	(France) Jérémy Jacquet	
October	(Uruguay) Ronald Araújo	

==== Premier League Player of the Matchweek ====
Matchweek	Player	Result	Ref.
Matchweek 3	(Netherlands) Cody Gakpo	Nominated	
Matchweek 3	(Sweden) Alexander Isak	Nominated	
Matchweek 8	(Uruguay) Ronald Araújo	Won	
Matchweek 10	(Brazil) Alisson Becker	Won	

==== Premier League Player of the Month ====
Month	Player	Result	Ref.
September	(Sweden) Alexander Isak	Nominated	
September	(France) Jérémy Jacquet	Nominated	

==== Premier League Save of the Month ====
Month	Player	Match	Result	Ref.
August	(Brazil) Alisson Becker	v. Nottingham Forest (H), 29 August 2026	Nominated	
September	(Brazil) Alisson Becker	v. Bournemouth (A), 20 September 2026	Nominated	

=== Manager Awards ===
==== Premier League Manager of the Month ====
Month	Manager	Result	Ref.
September	(Spain) Andoni Iraola	Nominated	
