= Rio Ngumoha =

English footballer (born 2008)

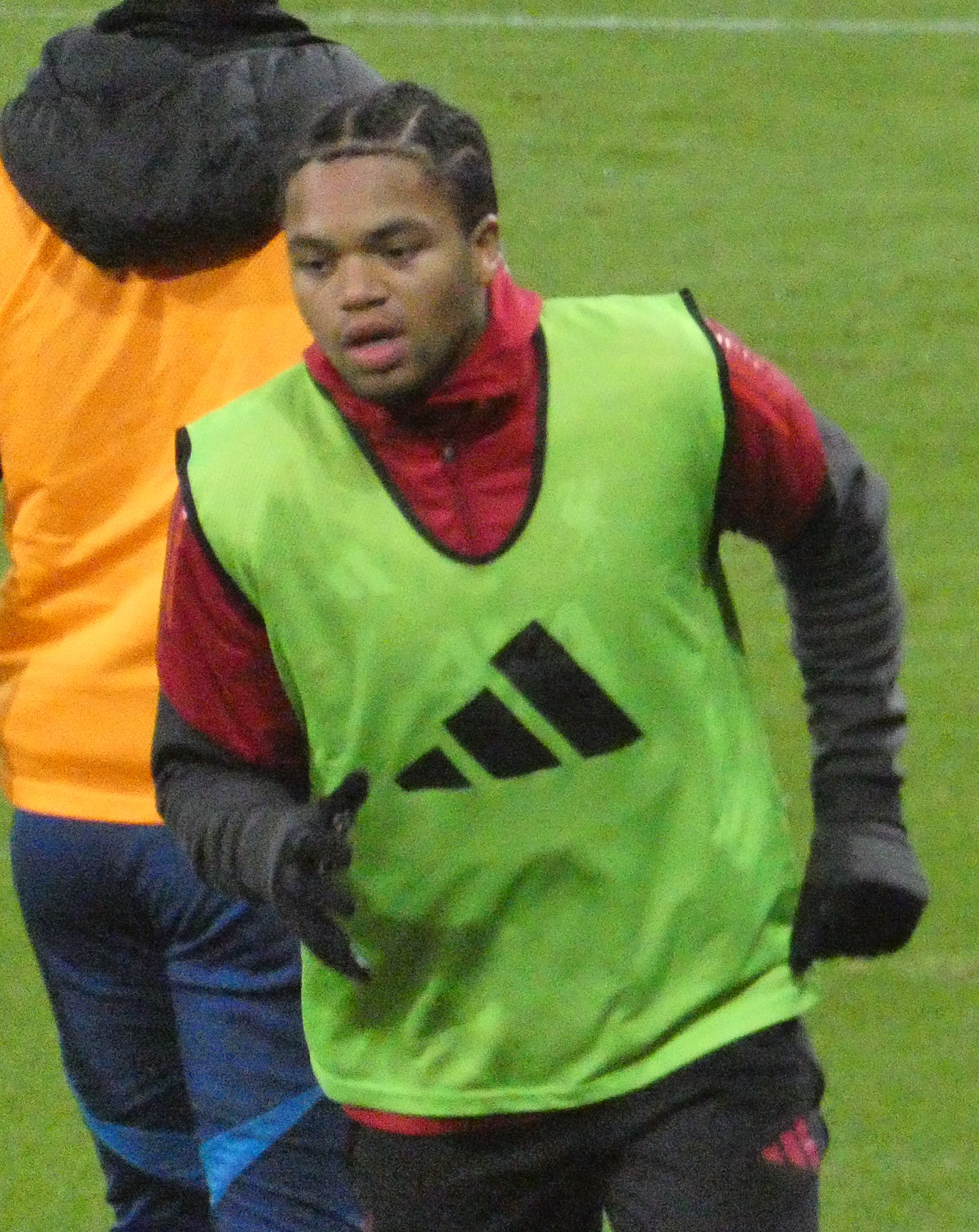
- Ngumoha with Liverpool in 2026

Personal information
- Full name: Rio Chima Ngumoha
- Date of birth: 29 August 2008 (age 18)
- Place of birth: Newham, England
- Height: 5 ft 7 in (1.70 m)
- Position: Winger

Team information
- Current team: Liverpool
- Number: 73

Youth career
- 2016–2024: Chelsea
- 2024–2025: Liverpool

Senior career*
| Years | Team | Apps | (Gls) |
| 2025– | Liverpool | 28 | (3) |

International career^{‡}
| 2023 | England U15 | 4 | (2) |
| 2023–2024 | England U16 | 9 | (2) |
| 2024–2025 | England U17 | 11 | (2) |
| 2025– | England U19 | 11 | (1) |
| 2026– | England | 4 | (0) |
- * Club domestic league appearances and goals as of 22 November 2026 (UTC) ‡ National team caps and goals as of 12 November 2026 (UTC)

Rio Chima Ngumoha (born 29 August 2008) is an English professional footballer who plays as a winger for Premier League club Liverpool and the England national team.

== Club career ==
=== Chelsea ===
Ngumoha joined the Chelsea academy aged eight and scored in Chelsea's 3–1 win over Wolverhampton Wanderers in the U17 Premier League Cup final on 11 April 2024.

=== Liverpool ===
Ngumoha joined Liverpool in the summer of 2024 which reportedly led to a worsening of relations between the two clubs due to the nature of his exit. On 5 February 2026, a Professional Football Compensation Committee (PFCC) tribunal ordered that Liverpool must reimburse Chelsea a minimum of £2.8 million for Ngumoha's training and development while with the Blues.

In the autumn of the 2024–25 season, Ngumoha was called-up to train with the Liverpool first team squad by manager Arne Slot. He was named amongst the match day substitutes for Liverpool's EFL Cup tie against Southampton on 18 December 2024. On 11 January 2025, Ngumoha made his professional debut as a starter in Liverpool's 4–0 win against Accrington Stanley in the FA Cup. He became the youngest Liverpool player to appear in the FA Cup aged 16 years, 135 days and at the same time became the youngest player to start a first-team game in the club's history, before being substituted off for Jayden Danns in the 71st-minute.

Ngumoha was included in the Liverpool squad for the July 2025 pre-season tour to Hong Kong and Japan. He featured for the club in pre-season friendlies, being praised for his performances, getting two goals and two assists across his four games. On 25 August, Ngumoha made his Premier League debut as an added-time substitute for Cody Gakpo and scored in the 10th minute of stoppage time, securing a 3–2 away win over Newcastle United and becoming the youngest goalscorer in club history. The goal also surpassed Darwin Núñez's winning goal against Nottingham Forest in March 2024 by a minute to become the club's latest game-winning goal in the Premier League. On 17 September, a month later, he made his UEFA Champions League debut in a 3–2 victory over Atlético Madrid, at just 17 years and 19 days old, making him the youngest Liverpool player to appear in the competition, breaking the previous record held by Trey Nyoni. A week later, on 25 September, he signed his first professional contract with Liverpool.

On 11 April 2026, Ngumoha scored his first goal at Anfield in a 2–0 win against Fulham, becoming the youngest player to achieve this feat, aged 17 years and 225 days, breaking the previous record set by Raheem Sterling.

== International career ==
Born in England, Ngumoha is of Nigerian and Guadeloupean descent. Rio holds both Nigerian and French nationalities from his parents. He made his England under-15 and England U16 debuts in 2023. In October 2024, he played for England U17. He was called-up for the 2025 UEFA European Under-17 Championship. On 3 September 2025, Ngumoha made his England U19 debut during a 2–0 win over Ukraine at the Pinatar Arena.

On 23 May 2026, it was announced that Ngumoha was one of the four players (alongside Alex Scott, Josh King and Ethan Nwaneri) that would join the senior team for the squad's preparation camp before the 2026 FIFA World Cup.

Ngumoha made his debut for the senior England team as a second-half substitute during the 1–0 friendly victory against New Zealand on 6 June 2026 at Raymond James Stadium in Tampa. Upon doing so, Ngumoha became the fifth youngest England debutant and the nation's 1,300th senior international. He received the Player of the Match Award for his performance. On 29 September, he made his competitive debut for England, appearing as a second-half substitute for Bukayo Saka in the second half of a 2–0 win against the Czech Republic in the UEFA Nations League. At the age of 18 years and 31 days he became the third youngest player to appear in a competitive game for England, after Wayne Rooney and Jude Bellingham.

== Style of play ==
Described as a “skillful” and “creative forward" Ngumoha was included in The Guardian’s 'Next Generation 2024: 20 of the best talents at Premier League clubs' series.

== Personal life ==
Ngumoha is cousins with Stockport County midfielder Jason Adigun.

== Career statistics ==
=== Club ===
As of match played 22 November 2026

Appearances and goals by club, season and competition
| Club | Season | League | | | FA Cup | | EFL Cup | | Europe | | Other | | Total | |
| Club | Season | Division | Apps | Goals | Apps | Goals | Apps | Goals | Apps | Goals | Apps | Goals | Apps | Goals |
|---|---|---|---|---|---|---|---|---|---|---|---|---|---|---|
| Liverpool | 2024–25 | Premier League | 0 | 0 | 1 | 0 | 0 | 0 | 0 | 0 | — | | 1 | 0 |
| Liverpool | 2025–26 | Premier League | 19 | 2 | 4 | 0 | 2 | 0 | 4 (Note: Appearances in UEFA Champions League) | 0 | 0 | 0 | 29 | 2 |
| Liverpool | 2026–27 | Premier League | 9 | 1 | 0 | 0 | 2 | 0 | 4 | 0 | 0 | 0 | 15 | 1 |
| Career total | | | 28 | 3 | 5 | 0 | 4 | 0 | 8 | 0 | 0 | 0 | 45 | 3 |

=== International ===
As of match played 12 November 2026

Appearances and goals by national team and year
| National team | Year | Apps | Goals |
|---|---|---|---|
| England | 2026 | 4 | 0 |
| Total | | 4 | 0 |

== Honours ==
Chelsea

- U17 Premier League Cup: 2023–24

Individual

- Premier League Home Grown Debutant of the Season: 2025–26
