= Michael Beale (football coach) =

English football manager (born 1980)

Personal information
- Full name: Michael Beale
- Date of birth: 4 September 1980 (age 46)
- Place of birth: Bromley, London, England

Youth career
- Years: Team
- 1998–2001: Charlton Athletic

Managerial career
- 2022: Queens Park Rangers
- 2022–2023: Rangers
- 2023–2024: Sunderland
- 2026: Zulte Waregem

Michael Beale (born 4 September 1980) is an English football manager who was most recently the manager of Belgian Pro League club Zulte Waregem.

Beale began his coaching career in his twenties, spending 10 years coaching the Chelsea youth team, before spending six years at Liverpool. He left Liverpool to become assistant manager at São Paulo in late 2016, becoming the first Englishman to coach in the Brazilian top-flight. Beale then began working with Steven Gerrard as his first-team coach in 2018, firstly at Rangers in the Scottish Premiership, where they won the title in the 2020–21 season. He then moved to Aston Villa with Gerrard, this time as assistant manager.

His first managerial role came at Queens Park Rangers, where he was appointed ahead of the 2022–23 EFL Championship season. After 16 games, with QPR top of the table, Beale rejected an approach from Wolverhampton Wanderers to manage in the Premier League. He instead returned to Rangers in November 2022, remaining in charge of the Scottish club until October 2023. Most recently, Beale returned to working with Gerrard as assistant manager of Al-Ettifaq in November 2024. He remained in the position until 2025, leaving the role to become executive consultant to the team's owners.

== Early life and playing career ==
Beale was born and raised in London. His playing career started at Charlton Athletic as a youth player. After being released by Charlton he had short trials at Twente in the Netherlands and also with clubs in the United States. Beale called an end to his playing days at the age of 21.

== Managerial and coaching career ==
=== Early career ===
Beale's next step in football was to invest some of the money he had made as a youth player into setting up a futsal club for children in his hometown of Bromley, South London. It was while training children here that he caught the attention of Chelsea Academy boss Neil Bath who, in 2002, offered him a role as a part-time youth coach at their Cobham Training Centre, where he worked as lead coach of Chelsea's Under-10s squad.

In 2006, Beale became a full time coach at Chelsea as a Youth Development Officer and was U14 coach, with a duel role to oversee coaching methodology for the U6-U8s development centre programme. Many notable players came through this system during his time at Chelsea to play in the Premier League, including Declan Rice, Reece James, Conor Gallagher, Dominic Solanke and Tino Livramento.

In 2012, Beale took an offer to work at the Liverpool Academy, beginning as the coach of the Under-16s team. He then progressed to become coach of the Under-21s, a youth side which included many notable talents including Trent Alexander Arnold. It was in this role that Beale first worked alongside Steven Gerrard, who was coaching the Liverpool Under-18s at the time. His role at Liverpool grew over the six years he was there working closely with Jurgen Klopp and other coaches. In 2014, Beale brought in Pep Lijnders as Liverpool's under-16s coach. Lijnders went onto serve as Klopp's assistant on two occasions and as Pep Guardiola's assistant at Manchester City.

=== São Paulo ===
In January 2017, Beale accepted the opportunity to move to Brazilian club São Paulo, learning Portuguese to act as assistant to Rogério Ceni. Beale’s time in Brazil at São Paulo lasted 36 games over a seven month period, before he announced he was resigning from his role as assistant and returned to Liverpool as head of academy coaching.

=== Rangers ===
After eight months working back inside Liverpool's youth set-up, Beale was recruited by Steven Gerrard to act as the first team coach at Rangers. In three years in Scotland under Gerrard, Beale and Gary McAllister, Rangers won their *55th league title in the 2020–21 league season preventing city rivals Celtic from winning a tenth successive league title. The team remained unbeaten across an invincible 38 game league season and broke several records for fewest goals conceded by a top flight British team, with only 13 goals conceded over a 38 game season, adding to a league record of 26 clean sheets, 19 consecutive home league wins..

=== Aston Villa ===
In November 2021, Beale followed Gerrard in his role as assistant manager. On 21 October 2022, Gerrard and his backroom staff were sacked following a 3–0 defeat to Fulham, with Aston Villa outside the relegation zone on goals scored.

=== Queens Park Rangers ===
On 1 June 2022, Beale was appointed first team coach at Championship side Queens Park Rangers. Beale had a slow start to his managerial career, picking five points up from his first five matches in charge. Beale's QPR then went on an incredible run, winning eight of the next 11 league games which pushed his side to the top of the championship. This included three notable away wins, two in London derbies against Millwall and Watford, and against eventual runners-up, Sheffield United. With QPR at in the promotion places, Premier League strugglers Wolves approached QPR on the availability of Beale. He remained with QPR after rejecting the move to Wolverhampton Wanderers.

QPR lost four of their next five games, before Beale was again linked with another vacant post at his previous club Rangers following the sacking of Giovanni van Bronckhorst. This time Beale opted to leave the Championship club to return to Scotland, this time as manager, where he had previously served as first team coach under Steven Gerrard.

=== Return to Rangers ===
On 28 November 2022, Beale accepted an approach to leave QPR and manage Scottish side Rangers, where he had worked previously as the first team coach under Steven Gerrard. Beale had a successful start to his Rangers managerial career, winning his first four matches in charge, after which he was named Scottish Premiership manager of the month for December. The form that secured his manager of the month accolade in December continued into the new year, with Rangers going 14 games unbeaten in all competitions. This was ended in the Scottish League Cup by Celtic, with Beale's team finishing as runners-up following a 2–1 defeat at Hampden Park. Beale's record in the first 20 games as manager was won 18, drew 1, lost 1, which is the best start by any Rangers manager. Rangers finished the season as runners-up on 92 points, the highest runners-up total in the history of the Scottish Premiership and the fourth highest points total in the club's history.

Rangers had a mixed start to the 2023-24 season, but by the beginning of October had recorded 8 wins, 2 draws and 4 defeats. Three of these defeats had come in the league, which proved to be Beale's undoing at the club as Celtic were unbeaten during that same period. This included a win at Ibrox against Real Betis, which sent them top of the 2023–24 UEFA Europa League group. Beale was sacked on 1 October 2023 after a third defeat in seven matches. Across his entire tenure at Rangers, he won 31 of his 43 games in charge.

=== Sunderland ===
On 18 December 2023, Beale was appointed as head coach of Sunderland on a contract until the Summer of 2026. Beale said joining the club was a "huge honour" and a "fantastic opportunity", praising the "alignment" within the club and the similarity of its and his philosophies. On 19 January 2024, Sunderland lost to an out-of-form Hull City, marking a third successive defeat and the fourth defeat in Beale's first seven fixtures as head coach. After this loss, Beale was met with widespread criticism from Sunderland supporters, including calls for his dismissal.

During a press conference held on 26 January 2024, Beale criticsed the "negativity" and "lack of respect" he said he had received from Sunderland supporters during his tenure. On 17 February, the pressure on Beale further increased after Sunderland lost 2–1 to Birmingham City, who were being managed by Beale's predecessor as Sunderland head coach, Tony Mowbray. In the same match, Beale seemingly ignored an attempted handshake from Sunderland defender Trai Hume, leading to more criticism from Sunderland fans.

On 19 February 2024, Sunderland sacked Beale. He was head coach for 63 days and oversaw 12 games, the shortest managerial stint in Sunderland's history. During his 12 games in charge of Sunderland, they won 4 games, drew 2 games, and lost 6 games, and both scored and conceded 13 goals. After his sacking, Beale was accused of using an anonymous "burner" account on Twitter during his tenure. The account had retweeted posts defending him and criticising the Sunderland fans and owners.

=== Al-Ettifaq ===
In November 2024, Beale once again reunited with Gerrard, being appointed as his assistant at Saudi club Al-Ettifaq.

Beale and Gerrard's reunion was short lived, with them only together for nine games before the club parted company with Gerrard. Beale remained as an executive consultant to the owners.

=== Zulte Waregem ===
On 19 May 2026, Belgian club Zulte Waregem announced the appointment of Beale as their new head coach ahead of the 2026–27 season.

On November 11, 2026 Beale resigned after a six match losing run and breakdown in relations with senior club figures.

== Managerial statistics ==
As of match played 8 November 2026

Managerial record by team and tenure
Team	From	To	Record								Ref
Team	From	To	G	W	D	L	GF	GA	GD	Win %	Ref
Queens Park Rangers	1 June 2022	28 November 2022	22	9	5	8	27	25	+2	40.91	
Rangers	28 November 2022	1 October 2023	43	31	4	8	92	44	+48	72.09	
Sunderland	18 December 2023	19 February 2024	12	4	2	6	13	16	−3	33.33	
Zulte Waregem	19 May 2026	11 November 2026	12	4	2	6	16	20	−4	33.33	
Total			89	48	13	28	148	105	+43	53.93	—
