= James McConnell (footballer, born 2004) =

English footballer (born 2004)

Personal information
- Full name: James William McConnell
- Date of birth: 13 September 2004 (age 22)
- Place of birth: Newcastle upon Tyne, England
- Height: 5 ft 9 in (1.75 m)
- Position: Midfielder

Team information
- Current team: Liverpool
- Number: 53

Youth career
- –2019: Sunderland
- 2019–2023: Liverpool

Senior career*
Years	Team	Apps	(Gls)
2023–	Liverpool	3	(0)
2025–2026	→ Ajax (loan)	4	(0)

International career^{‡}
2025–	England U20	1	(0)
- * Club domestic league appearances and goals as of 19:37, 26 October 2025 (UTC) ‡ National team caps and goals as of 19:15, 23 March 2025 (UTC)

James William McConnell (born 13 September 2004) is an English professional footballer who plays as a midfielder for Premier League club Liverpool.

== Club career ==
McConnell joined Liverpool from Sunderland at U15 level. By the 2021–22 season, he had starting playing regularly for the Liverpool U18 side, having first started playing for them at 16 years-of-age. He signed a professional contract with the club shortly after his seventeenth birthday. This was extended in October 2022, as he agreed a long-term professional contract with Liverpool.

He was included in Liverpool's 27-man squad to tour Singapore in July 2023. He was singled out for praise from Jürgen Klopp for his efforts in Singapore, as well as being praised by former players and journalists. He was included in a Liverpool first team match day squad for the first time on 12 August 2023, named as a substitute in the Premier League against Chelsea. He made his senior debut for Liverpool in a 5–1 UEFA Europa League victory over Toulouse at Anfield on 26 October 2023. He made his Premier League debut on 12 November 2023, appearing as a late substitute for Dominik Szoboszlai, in a 3–0 home win over Brentford.

McConnell made his first start for Liverpool in the FA Cup fourth round match against Norwich City at Anfield on 28 January 2024, contributing an assist for Curtis Jones' first goal in an eventual 5–2 victory.

He made an appearance from the bench as Liverpool won the 2024 EFL Cup final 1–0 against Chelsea at Wembley Stadium on 25 February 2024.

He was included in the Liverpool starting XI for the UEFA Champions League match against PSV Eindhoven on 29 January 2025.

On 29 August 2025, he signed a new five year contract with the club and was loaned to Ajax for the season. After seven appearances, McConnell returned to Liverpool in February 2026.

== International career ==
On 21 March 2025, McConnell debuted for the England U20s during a 1–1 draw with Portugal.

== Style of play ==
Initially an attacking midfielder, McConnell adapted his game to play as a holding midfield player under the tutelage of Jürgen Klopp and Pepijn Lijnders following the departures of Jordan Henderson and Fabinho from Liverpool in the summer of 2023.

== Career statistics ==
As of match played 28 October 2026

Appearances and goals by club, season and competition
Club	Season	League			National cup (Note: Includes FA Cup)		League cup (Note: Includes EFL Cup)		Europe		Other		Total	
Club	Season	Division	Apps	Goals	Apps	Goals	Apps	Goals	Apps	Goals	Apps	Goals	Apps	Goals
Liverpool U21	2022–23	—			—		—		—		2 (Note: Appearances in EFL Trophy)	0	2	0
Liverpool U21	2023–24	—			—		—		—		3	0	3	0
Liverpool U21	Total		—		—		—		—		5	0	5	0
Liverpool	2023–24	Premier League	3	0	2	0	1	0	3 (Note: Appearances in UEFA Europa League)	0	—		9	0
Liverpool	2024–25	Premier League	0	0	2	0	1	0	1 (Note: Appearance(s) in UEFA Champions League)	0	—		4	0
Liverpool	2025–26	Premier League	0	0	0	0	—		0	0	0	0	0	0
Liverpool	2026–27	Premier League	0	0	0	0	2	0	1	0	—		3	0
Liverpool	Total		3	0	4	0	4	0	5	0	0	0	16	0
Ajax (loan)	2025–26	Eredivisie	4	0	0	0	—		3	0	—		7	0
Career total			7	0	4	0	4	0	8	0	5	0	28	0

== Honours ==
Liverpool

- EFL Cup: 2023–24; runner-up: 2024–25
