= 2024 EFL Cup final =

Final of the 2023–24 EFL Cup

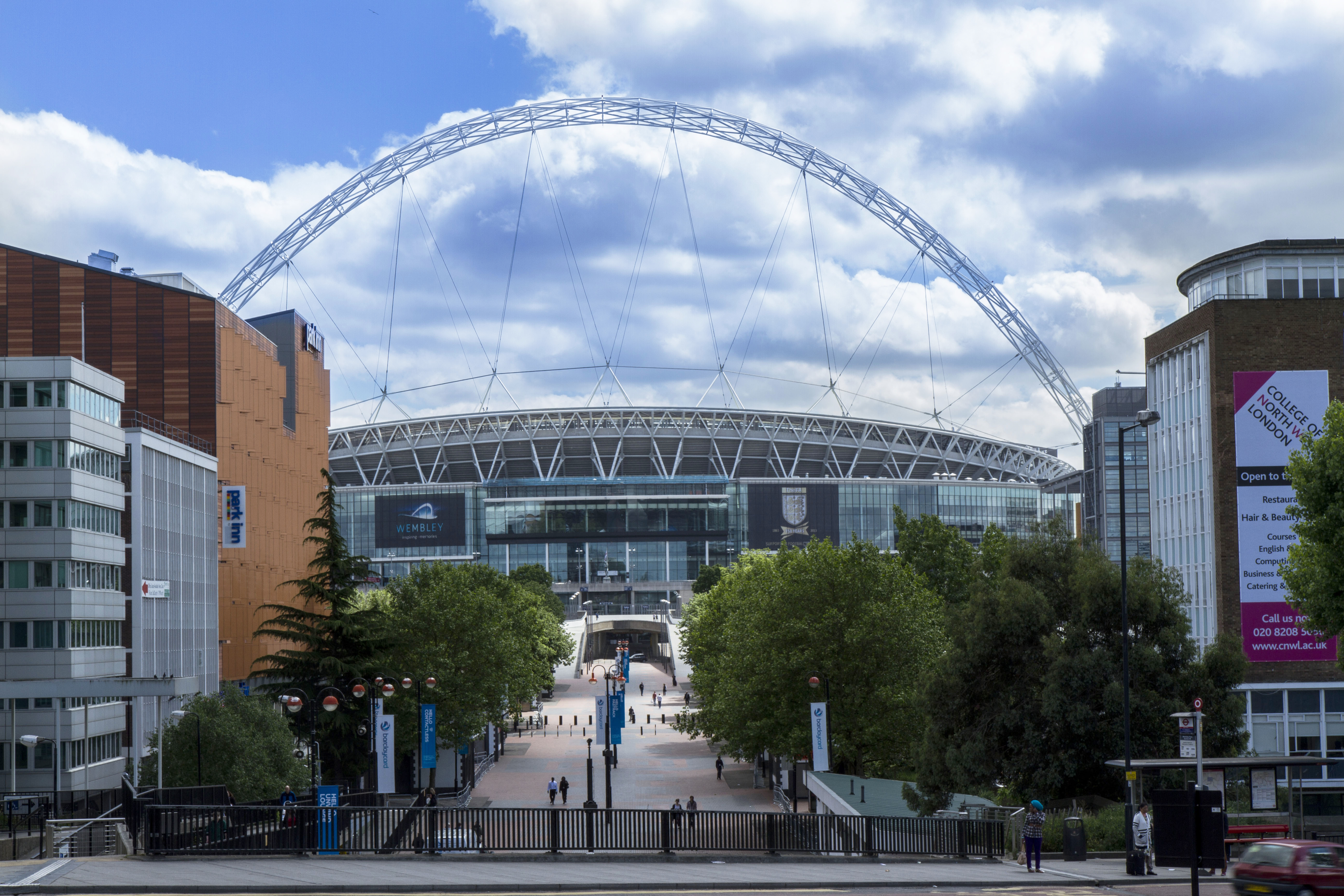
- Wembley Stadium hosted the match
- Event: 2023–24 EFL Cup
Chelsea	Liverpool
0	1
- After extra time
- Date: 25 February 2024
- Venue: Wembley Stadium, London
- Man of the Match: Virgil van Dijk (Liverpool)
- Referee: Chris Kavanagh (Lancashire)
- Attendance: 88,868

The 2024 EFL Cup final was the final match of the 2023–24 EFL Cup. It was played between Chelsea and Liverpool, in a repeat of the 2022 final, at Wembley Stadium in London, England, on 25 February 2024.

Liverpool won the match 1–0 after extra time to secure a record-extending tenth EFL Cup title.

== Route to the final ==
=== Chelsea ===
Round	Opposition	Score
2	AFC Wimbledon (H)	2–1
3	Brighton & Hove Albion (H)	1–0
4	Blackburn Rovers (H)	2–0
QF	Newcastle United (H)	1–1 (4–2 p.)
SF	Middlesbrough (A)	0–1
SF	Middlesbrough (H)	6–1
Key: (H) = Home; (A) = Away

As a Premier League club not involved in any UEFA competitions, Chelsea entered the cup in the second round where they were drawn at home to EFL League Two club AFC Wimbledon. The match was played at Stamford Bridge on 30 August 2023, where Chelsea won 2–1 thanks to goals from Noni Madueke and Enzo Fernández, with the latter scoring his first goal for the club. In the third round, they were drawn at home to fellow Premier League club Brighton & Hove Albion, played at Stamford Bridge on 27 September. The match finished 1–0, with the lone goal coming from striker Nicolas Jackson in the 50th minute. In the fourth round, Chelsea were drawn at home against EFL Championship club Blackburn Rovers, with the match played on 1 November. The match saw Chelsea comfortably defeat Blackburn by a score of 2–0, with goals coming from both Benoît Badiashile and Raheem Sterling.

In the quarter-finals, Chelsea were drawn at home for the fourth consecutive time to Premier League club and 2023 finalists Newcastle United, with the match played at Stamford Bridge on 19 December. A an early Newcastle goal from Callum Wilson saw them try to maintain the lead, however a defensive mistake from Kieran Trippier led to a stoppage-time equalizer from Chelsea substitute Mykhailo Mudryk, sending the match to a penalty shoot-out. Chelsea won 4–2 on penalties with a 100% conversion rate, with Cole Palmer, Conor Gallagher, Christopher Nkunku, and Mudryk all scoring for the Blues. Wilson and Bruno Guimarães converted their penalties for Newcastle, with Trippier missing the target and Matt Ritchie having his decisive penalty saved by Đorđe Petrović. In the semi-finals, which were played over two legs, Chelsea were drawn against EFL Championship club Middlesbrough with the first leg played away at Riverside Stadium on 9 January 2024. Middlesbrough shocked the Blues, beating them 1–0 with a goal from Hayden Hackney. The second leg was played at Stamford Bridge on 23 January, with Chelsea winning 6–1 (6–2 on aggregate) in a must-win match, with an own goal from Jonny Howson, goals from Fernández, Axel Disasi, Madueke, and a brace from Palmer securing the victory for Chelsea, despite Middlesbrough's Morgan Rogers earning a consolation goal.

=== Liverpool ===
Round	Opposition	Score
3	Leicester City (H)	3–1
4	Bournemouth (A)	2–1
QF	West Ham United (H)	5–1
SF	Fulham (H)	2–1
SF	Fulham (A)	1–1
Key: (H) = Home; (A) = Away

As a Premier League club involved in UEFA competitions, Liverpool entered in the third round where they were drawn at home to EFL Championship club Leicester City. The match was played at Anfield on 27 September 2023, where Liverpool won 3–1 thanks to goals from Cody Gakpo, Dominik Szoboszlai and Diogo Jota. In the fourth round, they were drawn away to fellow Premier League club Bournemouth, played at Dean Court on 1 November 2023. The match finished with a 2–1 victory for Liverpool, with Cody Gakpo and Darwin Núñez both getting on the scoresheet. In the quarter-finals, Liverpool were drawn at home to Premier League club West Ham United, played at Anfield on 20 December 2023. Liverpool produced a dominant display to record a 5–1 victory, with goals coming from Dominik Szoboszlai, Curtis Jones, Cody Gakpo and Mohamed Salah. Jones scored twice, his second goal being Liverpool's 500th in the EFL Cup. In the semi-finals, which were played over two legs, Liverpool were drawn against Premier League club Fulham with the first leg played at home at Anfield on 10 January 2024. Despite going behind in the first-half via a goal from Willian, Liverpool completed a turnaround to win 2–1 after two second-half goals by Curtis Jones and Cody Gakpo. The second leg was played at Craven Cottage on 24 January, with the match ending in a 1–1 draw after Issa Diop cancelled out Luis Díaz's first-half strike. As a result, Liverpool won the tie 3–2 on aggregate to progress to their second EFL Cup final in three seasons.

== Pre-match ==
This was Chelsea's tenth League Cup final and Liverpool's fourteenth – the latter was the most appearances of any club in this competition. This was the sides' third meeting in a League Cup final, having met in 2005 and 2022, with Chelsea winning the former encounter and Liverpool winning the latter. The final was initially meant to kick off at 16:30 GMT, but was instead switched to a 15:00 kick off after the match was designated a "high-risk" fixture by the Metropolitan Police.

== Match ==
=== Team selection ===
Regular starters for Liverpool Mohamed Salah, Darwin Núñez, Dominik Szoboszlai, Joël Matip, Trent Alexander-Arnold, Alisson Becker and Diogo Jota were all ruled out of the final due to injury, as were Curtis Jones, Thiago Alcântara, Stefan Bajcetic and Ben Gannon-Doak.

=== Summary ===
The match kicked off at 15:00 in front of a crowd of 88,868. Chelsea came close to opening the scoring just within the opening 20 minutes, after Cole Palmer had an effort saved at point-blank range by Caoimhín Kelleher, before Nicolas Jackson's follow up effort was thwarted by Wataru Endō. In the 32nd minute, Palmer played a through-ball to Jackson, who then played the ball across from the right to Raheem Sterling who was left to slot the ball into the net. However, the goal was initially disallowed for offside by the assistant referee, and then also by the video assistant referee after making a check, confirming that Jackson was clearly in an offside position when receiving the through ball. Liverpool came close to scoring in the 40th minute after Andy Robertson played a cross towards Cody Gakpo, whose header rebounded off the right post.

In the second half, Liverpool thought they had taken the lead in the 60th minute after a free kick into the Chelsea penalty area by Robertson found its way towards Virgil van Dijk, who headed the ball into the corner of the Chelsea goal. However, the goal was disallowed by the video assistant referee, after adjudging that Endō was blocking Chelsea defender Levi Colwill while starting in an offside position. Chelsea came close to scoring in the 76th minute after Palmer played the ball across the Liverpool penalty area, where Conor Gallagher attempted to flick the ball into the Liverpool goal, however his effort ended up striking the right post. Into extra time, Van Dijk headed the ball across to substitute Jayden Danns, whose header had to be tipped over the goal by Đorđe Petrović. Late into extra time, Liverpool found a dramatic winning goal after a corner by Kostas Tsimikas from the right found its way on to the head of Van Dijk who managed to guide the ball past Petrović and into the left corner of the net. Despite desperate late attempts from Chelsea to find a goal, Liverpool came out victorious with a 1–0 win after extra time to secure their tenth EFL Cup, and their second in three seasons.

=== Details ===
25 February 2024
15:00 GMT

Chelsea	0–1 (a.e.t.)	Liverpool
	Report	Van Dijk 118'

Wembley Stadium, London
Attendance: 88,868
Referee: Chris Kavanagh

Chelsea	Liverpool

GK	28	(Serbia) Đorđe Petrović
RB	27	(France) Malo Gusto
CB	2	(France) Axel Disasi
CB	26	(England) Levi Colwill
LB	21	(England) Ben Chilwell (c)	(yellow card) 45+3'	(substituted off) 113'
CM	25	(Ecuador) Moisés Caicedo
CM	8	(Argentina) Enzo Fernández
RW	20	(England) Cole Palmer	(yellow card) 120+2'
AM	23	(England) Conor Gallagher		(substituted off) 97'
LW	7	(England) Raheem Sterling		(substituted off) 67'
CF	15	(Senegal) Nicolas Jackson		(substituted off) 90'
Substitutes:
GK	1	(Spain) Robert Sánchez
GK	13	(England) Marcus Bettinelli
DF	14	(England) Trevoh Chalobah		(substituted on) 113'
DF	42	(England) Alfie Gilchrist
MF	49	(Finland) Jimi Tauriainen
MF	56	(England) Billy Gee
FW	10	(Ukraine) Mykhailo Mudryk		(substituted on) 90'
FW	11	(England) Noni Madueke		(substituted on) 97'
FW	18	(France) Christopher Nkunku		(substituted on) 67'
Manager:
(Argentina) Mauricio Pochettino

GK	62	(Republic of Ireland) Caoimhín Kelleher
RB	84	(Northern Ireland) Conor Bradley	(yellow card) 45+3'	(substituted off) 72'
CB	5	(France) Ibrahima Konaté	(yellow card) 82'	(substituted off) 106'
CB	4	(Netherlands) Virgil van Dijk (c)
LB	26	(Scotland) Andy Robertson		(substituted off) 87'
CM	10	(Argentina) Alexis Mac Allister	(yellow card) 81'	(substituted off) 87'
CM	3	(Japan) Wataru Endō
CM	38	(Netherlands) Ryan Gravenberch		(substituted off) 28'
RW	19	(England) Harvey Elliott
CF	18	(Netherlands) Cody Gakpo		(substituted off) 87'
LW	7	(Colombia) Luis Díaz
Substitutes:
GK	13	(Spain) Adrián
DF	2	(England) Joe Gomez	(yellow card) 120+3'	(substituted on) 28'
DF	21	(Greece) Kostas Tsimikas		(substituted on) 87'
DF	78	(England) Jarell Quansah		(substituted on) 106'
MF	42	(England) Bobby Clark		(substituted on) 72'
MF	53	(England) James McConnell	(yellow card) 107'	(substituted on) 87'
MF	98	(England) Trey Nyoni
FW	67	(Wales) Lewis Koumas
FW	76	(England) Jayden Danns		(substituted on) 87'
Manager:
(Germany) Jürgen Klopp

Man of the Match:
Virgil van Dijk (Liverpool)

Assistant referees:
Mark Scholes
James Mainwaring
Fourth official:
Tim Robinson
Reserve assistant referee:
Wade Smith
Video assistant referee:
John Brooks
Assistant video assistant referee:
Marc Perry

Match rules

- 90 minutes
- 30 minutes of extra time if necessary
- Penalty shoot-out if scores still level
- Nine named substitutes
- Maximum of five substitutions, with a sixth allowed in extra time (Note: Each team was given only three opportunities to make substitutions, with a fourth opportunity in extra time, excluding substitutions made at half-time, before the start of extra time and at half-time in extra time.)

=== Statistics ===
Overall
Statistic	Chelsea	Liverpool
Total shots	19	24
Shots on target	9	11
Ball possession	46%	54%
Corner kicks	6	5
Offside	3	2
Fouls committed	14	21
Yellow cards	2	5
Red cards	0	0

== Post-match ==
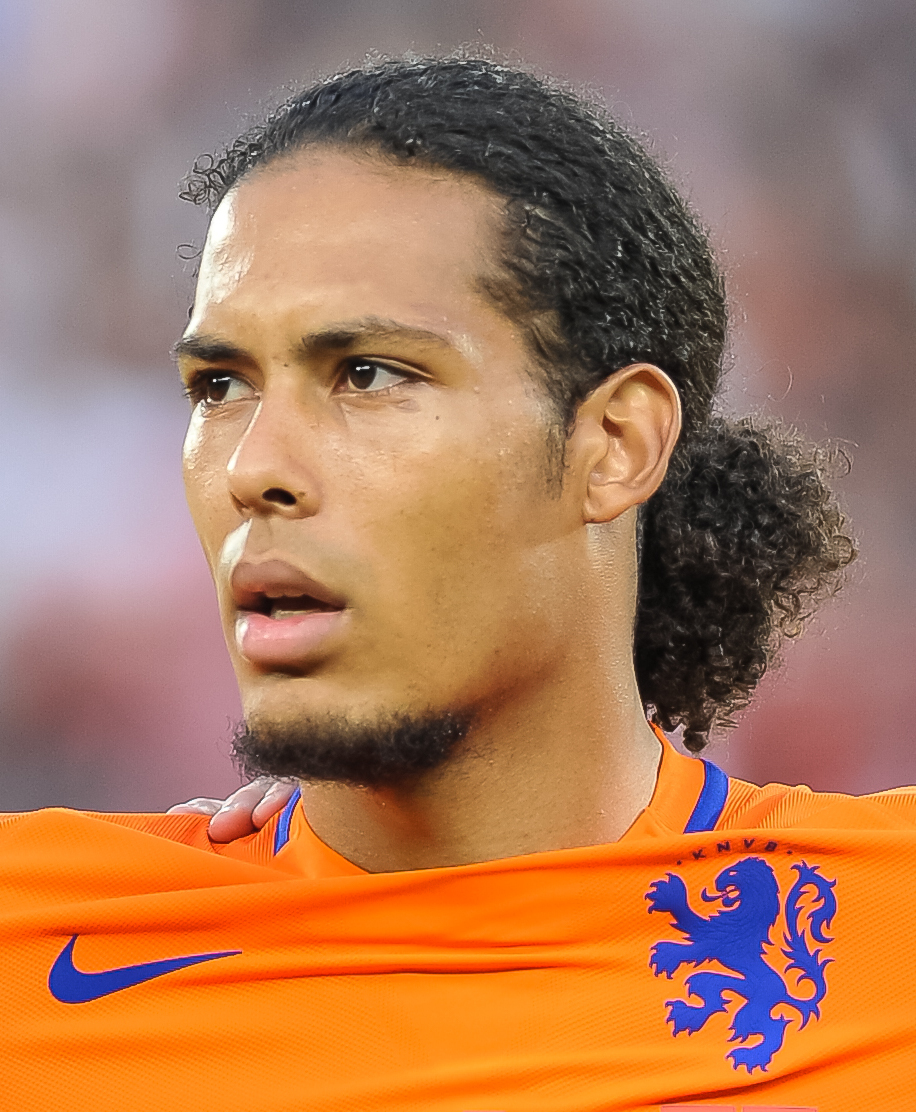
Liverpool captain and defender Virgil van Dijk scored the winning goal and was named man of the match.

With this defeat, Chelsea became the first team to lose six successive domestic cup finals. This dismal run began when they lost the 2019 EFL Cup final to Manchester City. They then lost two FA Cup finals in a row in 2020 and 2021 (to Arsenal and Leicester City, respectively). In 2022, they reached the final of the EFL Cup and their third successive FA Cup final; they would lose both of them on penalties to Liverpool after both matches ended in goalless draws. Former Manchester United player and Sky Sports commentator Gary Neville described the match as "Klopp's kids against the blue billion-pound bottle-jobs", referencing the Liverpool fringe players and Chelsea's overspending on player transfers.

For Liverpool, it was the first time under Jürgen Klopp that they had won a domestic cup final without the need of a penalty shoot-out, excluding the 2022 FA Community Shield, when they defeated Manchester City 3–1. It turned out to be Klopp's final trophy with the club, having announced a month prior to the final that he would leave at the end of the season.
