= Lewis Koumas =

Wales international footballer (born 2005)

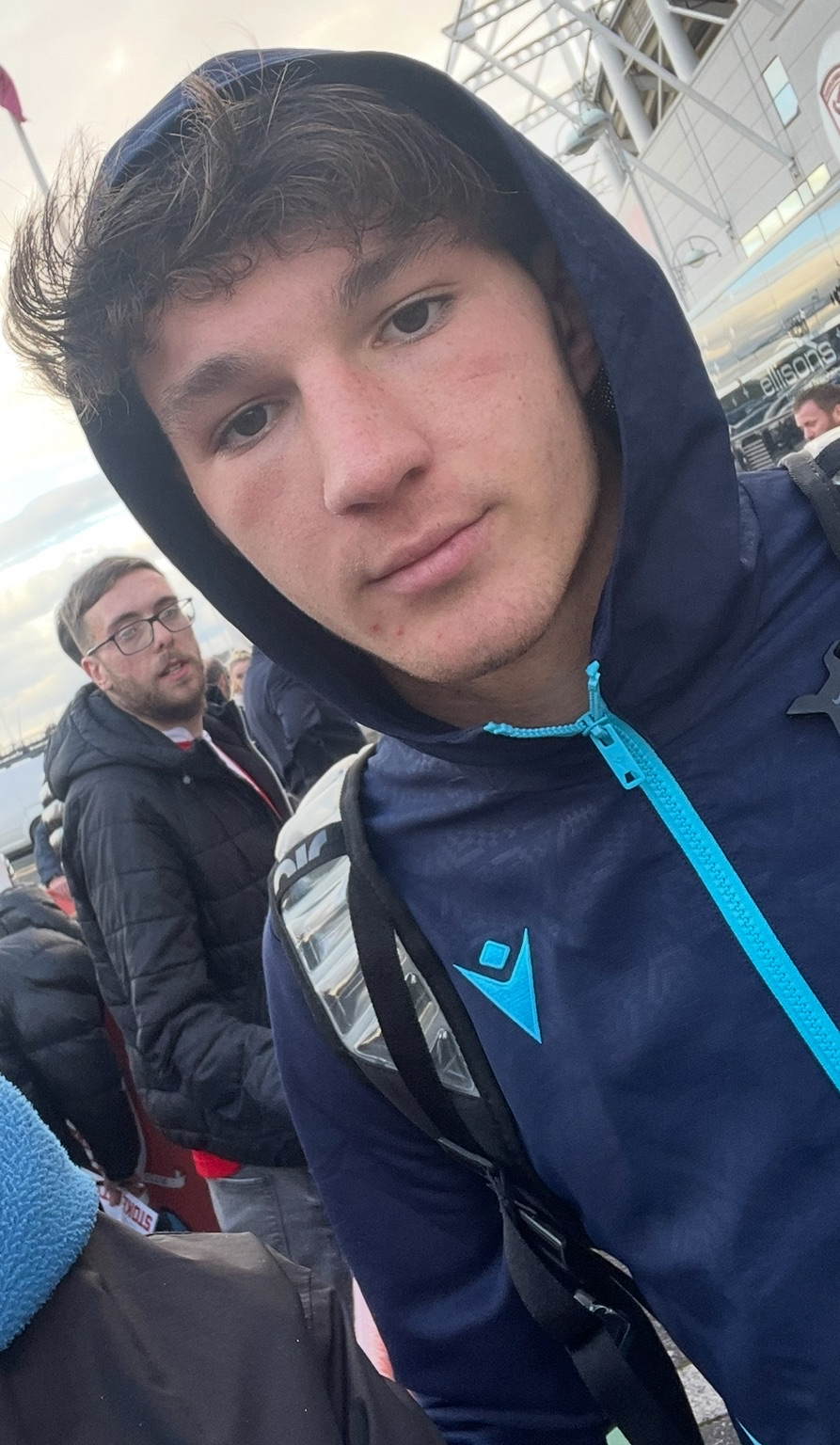
- Koumas with Stoke City in 2024

Personal information
- Full name: Lewis Terence Koumas
- Date of birth: 19 September 2005 (age 21)
- Place of birth: Chester, England
- Height: 6 ft 0 in (1.82 m)
- Position: Forward

Team information
- Current team: Liverpool
- Number: 67

Youth career
- 2013–2016: Tranmere Rovers
- 2016–2023: Liverpool

Senior career*
| Years | Team | Apps | (Gls) |
| 2023– | Liverpool | 9 | (0) |
| 2024–2025 | → Stoke City (loan) | 43 | (3) |
| 2025–2026 | → Birmingham City (loan) | 23 | (1) |
| 2026 | → Hull City (loan) | 17 | (3) |

International career^{‡}
| 2023 | Wales U19 | 5 | (1) |
| 2024– | Wales U21 | 2 | (1) |
| 2024– | Wales | 18 | (1) |
- * Club domestic league appearances and goals as of 18:45, 22 November 2026 (UTC) ‡ National team caps and goals as of 21:55, 17 November 2026 (UTC)

Lewis Terence Koumas (born 19 September 2005) is a professional footballer who plays as a forward for Premier League club Liverpool. Born in England, he plays for the Wales national team.

== Club career ==
=== Liverpool ===
Koumas joined the Liverpool academy as an 11-year old in November 2016, having spent three years with the academy of Tranmere Rovers. He signed his first professional contract with Liverpool in January 2023. Koumas appeared in the senior squad for the first time on 14 December 2023, remaining an unused substitute in a 2–1 loss to Union Saint-Gilloise in the Europa League. He was later an unused substitute in the EFL Cup final on 25 February 2024, in which Liverpool beat Chelsea 1–0 after extra time at Wembley Stadium. Koumas made his first team debut for Liverpool in the FA Cup fifth round against Southampton on 28 February 2024, scoring his first senior goal for the club late in the first half in an eventual 3–0 win.

On 23 August 2026, Koumas made his Premier League debut as a late substitute in a 2–2 away draw against Newcastle United on the opening day of the 2026–27 season.

On 14 October 2026, Koumas scored his first Champions League goal, netting for Liverpool in their 6-3 away win against LASK.

==== Stoke City (loan) ====
On 10 August 2024, Koumas signed a new long-term contract with Liverpool before joining Championship side Stoke City on loan for the 2024–25 season. He scored on his first league start on 25 August in a 2–1 loss to West Bromwich Albion. He scored twice against Cardiff City in the FA Cup on 8 February 2025. Koumas made 49 appearances for Stoke, scoring six goals, as they finished in 18th position, avoiding relegation on the final day of the season.

==== Birmingham City (loan) ====
On 22 August 2025, Koumas joined promoted EFL Championship team Birmingham City for the remainder of the 2025–26 season. On 4 January 2026, he scored his first goal for the club in a 3–2 victory over league-leading Coventry City. On 26 January 2026, Koumas returned to Liverpool.

==== Hull City (loan) ====
On 30 January 2026, Koumas joined EFL Championship team Hull City for the remainder of the 2025–26 season. He made his debut the following day as a 77th-minute substitute for Joe Gelhardt, scoring the only goal in the 1–0 away win against Blackburn Rovers.

== International career ==
Koumas was eligible to represent England through birth, Wales through his father and Cyprus through his paternal grandfather. Koumas chose to play for Wales and was named in the Wales U19 national team in March 2023 for matches against Scotland U19. He made his debut on 23 March, starting in a 2–1 win for Wales before being substituted in the 55th minute. He was called up again in June and scored in a 2–2 draw against Sweden. Koumas made his debut for the Wales under-21 team on 22 March 2024, scoring the second goal in the 2–1 win in 2025 UEFA European Under-21 Championship qualifying against Lithuania. On 29 May 2024, he received his first call-up to the Wales senior squad for friendly fixtures against Gibraltar and Slovakia the following month. He made his debut in the match against Gibraltar, coming on as a substitute for Liam Cullen in a 0–0 draw. Koumas scored his first goal for Wales in a 1–1 friendly draw against Ghana at Cardiff City Stadium on 2 June 2026.

== Personal life ==
Koumas is the son of former Wales international footballer Jason Koumas.

Koumas grew up in Birkenhead and was educated at St John Plessington Catholic College in Bebington on the Wirral, Merseyside.

== Career statistics ==
=== Club ===
As of match played 22 November 2026

Appearances and goals by club, season and competition
| Club | Season | League | | | FA Cup | | EFL Cup | | Europe | | Other | | Total | |
| Club | Season | Division | Apps | Goals | Apps | Goals | Apps | Goals | Apps | Goals | Apps | Goals | Apps | Goals |
|---|---|---|---|---|---|---|---|---|---|---|---|---|---|---|
| Liverpool U21 | 2022–23 | — | — | | — | | — | | — | | 1 (Note: Appearance(s) in EFL Trophy) | 0 | 1 | 0 |
| Liverpool U21 | 2023–24 | — | — | | — | | — | | — | | 3 | 0 | 3 | 0 |
| Liverpool U21 | Total | | — | | — | | — | | — | | 4 | 0 | 4 | 0 |
| Liverpool | 2023–24 | Premier League | 0 | 0 | 1 | 1 | 0 | 0 | 0 | 0 | — | | 1 | 1 |
| Liverpool | 2026–27 | Premier League | 9 | 0 | 0 | 0 | 2 | 0 | 4 (Note: Appearances in UEFA Champions League) | 1 | – | | 15 | 1 |
| Liverpool | Total | | 9 | 0 | 1 | 1 | 2 | 0 | 4 | 1 | — | | 16 | 2 |
| Stoke City (loan) | 2024–25 | Championship | 43 | 3 | 2 | 2 | 4 | 1 | — | | — | | 49 | 6 |
| Birmingham City (loan) | 2025–26 | Championship | 23 | 1 | 1 | 0 | 1 | 0 | — | | — | | 25 | 1 |
| Hull City (loan) | 2025–26 | Championship | 17 | 3 | 1 | 0 | — | | — | | 1 (Note: Appearance in EFL Championship play-offs) | 0 | 19 | 3 |
| Career total | | | 92 | 7 | 5 | 3 | 7 | 1 | 4 | 1 | 5 | 0 | 113 | 12 |

=== International ===
As of match played 17 November 2026

Appearances and goals by national team and year
| National team | Year | Apps | Goals |
|---|---|---|---|
| Wales | 2024 | 5 | 0 |
| Wales | 2025 | 4 | 0 |
| Wales | 2026 | 9 | 1 |
| Total | | 18 | 1 |

As of match played 17 November 2026. Wales' score listed first, score column indicates score after each Koumas goal.

List of international goals scored by Lewis Koumas
| No. | Date | Venue | Cap | Opponent | Score | Result | Competition |
|---|---|---|---|---|---|---|---|
| 1 | 2 June 2026 | Cardiff City Stadium, Cardiff, Wales | 11 | Ghana | 1–1 | 1–1 | Friendly |

== Honours ==
Liverpool

- EFL Cup: 2023–24

Hull City

- EFL Championship play-offs: 2026
