= Fabian Mrozek =

Polish footballer (born 2003)

Personal information
- Full name: Fabian Mrozek
- Date of birth: 28 September 2003 (age 23)
- Place of birth: Wrocław, Poland
- Height: 1.90 m (6 ft 3 in)
- Position: Goalkeeper

Team information
- Current team: FC Cincinnati (on loan from Liverpool)
- Number: 93

Youth career
- 2012–2016: MKS Kluczbork
- 2017–2020: FC Wrocław Academy
- 2020–2024: Liverpool

Senior career*
Years	Team	Apps	(Gls)
2024–	Liverpool	0	(0)
2024	→ Brommapojkarna (loan)	5	(0)
2025	→ Forest Green Rovers (loan)	11	(0)
2026–	→ FC Cincinnati (loan)	0	(0)
2026–	→ FC Cincinnati 2 (loan)	12	(0)
- * Club domestic league appearances and goals as of 22:43, 28 August 2026 (UTC)

Fabian Mrozek (born 28 September 2003) is a Polish professional footballer who plays as a goalkeeper for Major League Soccer club FC Cincinnati, on loan from Premier League club Liverpool.

== Club career ==
Mrozek started training at MKS Kluczbork. In 2017, he joined the FC Wrocław Academy. He signed for Premier League side Liverpool in July 2020, and featured for the club in the 2021–22 UEFA Youth League. His unofficial first-team debut came on 15 July 2022, playing the last 10 minutes of a 2–0 friendly win against Crystal Palace.

On 26 July 2024, Mrozek extended his contract with Liverpool and was sent on a six-month loan to Allsvenskan club Brommapojkarna. He made his debut the following day, in a 3–4 away league win over IFK Göteborg.

On 4 February 2025, he joined National League side Forest Green Rovers on loan until the end of the season. Hours later, he made his debut starting in a 0–2 away win over Dagenham & Redbridge.

On 5 March 2026, Mrozek signed with Major League Soccer side FC Cincinnati on loan for the 2026 season, with an option to make the move permanent.

== International career ==
Mrozek has been called up to represent Poland internationally at youth level, and is yet to make an appearance.

== Style of play ==
Mrozek's strengths, as cited by FC Wrocław Academy's president Jakub Bednarek, are balance and mental strength.

== Personal life ==
He regarded Germany international Manuel Neuer as his football idol. As of 2025, Mrozek was sharing a house with teammate and countryman Kornel Miściur.

== Career statistics ==
As of match played 22 March 2025

Appearances and goals by club, season and competition
Club	Season	League			National cup		League cup		Continental		Other		Total	
Club	Season	Division	Apps	Goals	Apps	Goals	Apps	Goals	Apps	Goals	Apps	Goals	Apps	Goals
Liverpool U23	2021–22	—			—		—		—		0	0	0	0
Liverpool U23	2023–24	—			—		—		—		2 (Note: Appearances in EFL Trophy)	0	2	0
Liverpool U23	Total		—		—		—		—		2	0	2	0
Brommapojkarna (loan)	2024	Allsvenskan	5	0	0	0	—		—		—		5	0
Forest Green Rovers (loan)	2024–25	National League	11	0	—		—		—		—		11	0
Career total			16	0	0	0	0	0	0	0	2	0	18	0
