= Jayden Danns =

English footballer (born 2006)

Personal information
- Full name: Jayden Alexander Danns
- Date of birth: 16 January 2006 (age 20)
- Place of birth: Liverpool, England
- Height: 6 ft 0 in (1.83 m)
- Position: Striker

Team information
- Current team: Liverpool
- Number: 76

Youth career
- 2014–2023: Liverpool

Senior career*
Years	Team	Apps	(Gls)
2023–	Liverpool	3	(0)
2025	→ Sunderland (loan)	0	(0)

International career^{‡}
2021	England U16	3	(1)
2023–	England U18	9	(0)
2025–	England U20	1	(1)
- * Club domestic league appearances and goals as of 16:55, 25 January 2025 (UTC) ‡ National team caps and goals as of 13:30, 9 October 2025 (UTC)

Jayden Alexander Danns (born 16 January 2006) is an English professional footballer who plays as a striker for Premier League club Liverpool.

== Early life and career ==
Jayden Alexander Danns was born on 16 January 2006 in Liverpool. He joined Liverpool F.C. when he was eight years old and attended Rainhill High School, where he won the Year 8 Merseyside Schools Cup in 2019.

== Club career ==
Danns progressed through the Liverpool academy. While playing at U16 level, he suffered from Osgood–Schlatter disease. He began playing for the Liverpool U18 side when he was 16 years-old. He began the 2023–24 season in fine form, scoring in every competitive match for the Liverpool under-18s between August and December 2023, totalling nine goals in seven games. He also scored four goals in three games in the 2023–24 U18 Premier League Cup.

Danns made his debut at first-team level in the 2023–24 EFL Trophy, appearing as a second-half substitute against Morecambe in September 2023. On 21 February 2024, he made his Premier League debut as an 89th-minute substitute in a 4–1 home win over Luton Town. Four days later, he featured in the 2024 EFL Cup final as Liverpool beat Chelsea 1–0 at Wembley Stadium. He scored his first and second goals for Liverpool on 28 February in the fifth round of the FA Cup in a 3–0 home victory against Southampton. He was given the player of the match award for the first time. On 15 March 2024, Danns signed a new long-term contract with the club.

He suffered an injury in the pre-season of the 2024-25 season and didn't return to training until November 2024. He made a goal scoring return to the first team when he scored the third goal in a 4–0 win over Accrington Stanley in the FA Cup on 11 January 2025. He made his first Liverpool start in a 3-2 UEFA Champions League defeat against PSV Eindhoven on 29 January 2025.

On 4 February 2025, Danns joined EFL Championship club Sunderland on loan until the end of the season. Danns didn't make a single appearance for Sunderland during his loan due to a back injury.

== International career ==
He was called up to play with the England national under-18 team in October 2023.

On 5 September 2025, Danns made a goalscoring U20 debut during a 2-1 defeat to Italy at the SMH Group Stadium.

== Personal life ==
He is the son of former professional footballer and Guyana international Neil Danns. His grandfather, also called Neil, was a backing singer on the UK's entry in the 1987 Eurovision Song Contest as well as a European title-winning skateboarder. He has a younger brother, Kaylen, and a younger sister, Hayla-Essen.

== Career statistics ==
As of match played 23 September 2025

Appearances and goals by club, season and competition
Club	Season	League			FA Cup		EFL Cup		Europe		Other		Total	
Club	Season	Division	Apps	Goals	Apps	Goals	Apps	Goals	Apps	Goals	Apps	Goals	Apps	Goals
Liverpool U21	2023–24	—	—		—		—		—		1 (Note: Appearance in EFL Trophy)	0	1	0
Liverpool	2023–24	Premier League	2	0	1	2	1	0	1 (Note: Appearance in UEFA Europa League)	0	—		5	2
Liverpool	2024–25	Premier League	1	0	1	1	1	0	1 (Note: Appearance in UEFA Champions League)	0	—		4	1
Liverpool	2025–26	Premier League	0	0	0	0	1	0	0	0	0	0	1	0
Liverpool	2026–27	Premier League	0	0	0	0	0	0	0	0	—		0	0
Liverpool	Total		3	0	2	3	3	0	2	0	0	0	10	3
Sunderland (loan)	2024–25	Championship	0	0	—		—		—		0	0	0	0
Career total			3	0	2	3	2	0	2	0	1	0	10	3

== Honours ==
Liverpool

- EFL Cup: 2023–24
