= Chris Kavanagh (referee) =

English football referee (born 1985)

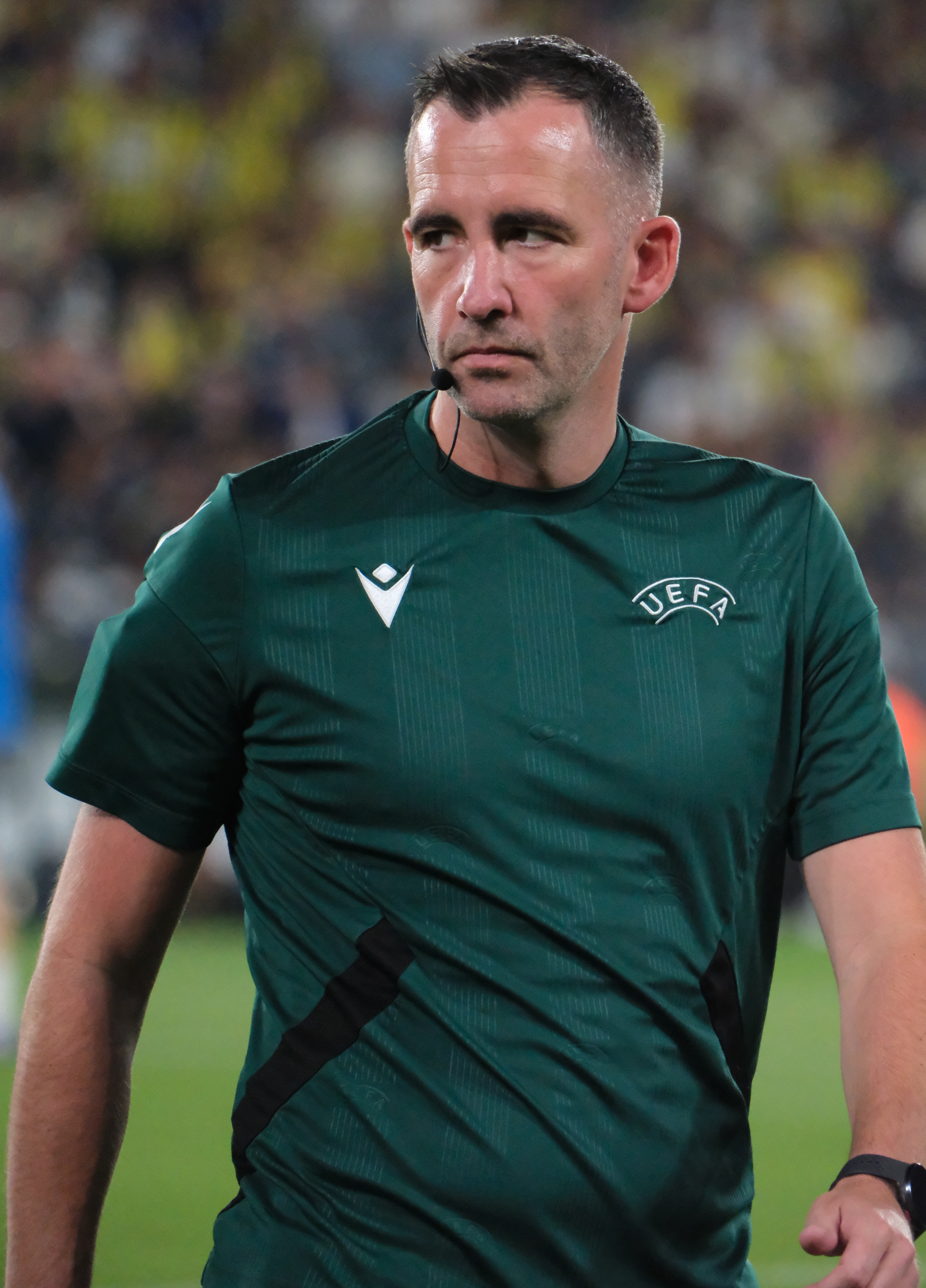
- Kavanagh in 2026
- Born: 4 September 1985 (age 41); Manchester, England

Domestic
Years	League	Role
2012–2014	National League	Referee
2014–2017	The Football League	Referee
2017–	Premier League	Referee

International
Years	League	Role
2019–	FIFA listed	Referee

Chris Kavanagh (born 4 September 1985) is an English professional football referee from Ashton-under-Lyne, Greater Manchester. He officiates primarily in the Premier League having been promoted to the Select Group of Referees in 2017.

== Career ==
Kavanagh began his refereeing career at the age of 13. In 2012, he was promoted to officiate matches in the National League.

Kavanagh began refereeing in the Football League in 2014. Kavanagh took charge of his first Premier League match in April 2017.

Kavanagh was appointed to FIFA's international referees list in 2019.

Kavanagh was the final appointed referee for the 2021 EFL Championship play-off final between Brentford and Swansea City at Wembley Stadium on 29 May 2021. Kavanagh was the video assistant referee for the 2021 FA Cup final between Chelsea and Leicester City.

Kavanagh was appointed referee for the 2024 EFL Cup final between Chelsea and Liverpool on 25 February 2024.

In December 2025, Kavanagh was promoted to the elite list of UEFA referees.
