= La'more Lee Forrester =

English footballer (born 2008)

Personal information
- Full name: La'more Lake Lee Forrester
- Date of birth: 7 August 2008 (age 18)
- Place of birth: England
- Height: 1.79 m (5 ft 10 in)
- Position: Right winger

Team information
- Current team: Liverpool

Youth career
- Liverpool

International career^{‡}
Years	Team	Apps	(Gls)
2023	England U15	3	(1)
- ‡ National team caps and goals as of 30 March 2023

La'more Lee Forrester (born 7 August 2008) is an English professional footballer who plays as a right winger for Liverpool.

== Club career ==
As a youth player, Lee Forrester joined the youth academy of Premier League side Liverpool at the age of six, where he played in the UEFA Youth League.

== International career ==
Lee Forrester is an England youth international. On 26 April 2023, he debuted for the England national under-15 football team during a 2–2 friendly draw with the United States boys' national under-15 soccer team.

== Style of play ==
Lee Forrester plays as a winger. Known for his speed, he has received comparisons to England international Raheem Sterling.
