= Kornel Miściur =

Polish footballer (born 2007)

Personal information
- Full name: Kornel Artur Miściur
- Date of birth: 27 April 2007 (age 19)
- Place of birth: Scarborough, England
- Height: 1.90 m (6 ft 3 in)
- Position: Goalkeeper

Team information
- Current team: Leek Town (on loan from Liverpool)

Youth career
- Burlington Jackdaws
- –2023: Hull City
- 2023–2026: Liverpool

Senior career*
Years	Team	Apps	(Gls)
2026–	Liverpool	0	(0)
2026–	→ Leek Town (loan)	3	(0)

International career^{‡}
2025	Poland U18	1	(0)
2025	Poland U19	1	(0)
- * Club domestic league appearances and goals as of 09:56, 20 September 2026 (UTC) ‡ National team caps and goals as of 9 September 2025

Kornel Miściur (born 27 April 2007) is a professional footballer who plays as a goalkeeper for Northern Premier League Premier Division club Leek Town, on loan from Premier League club Liverpool. Born in England, he is a Poland youth international.

== Early life ==
Miściur was born on 27 April 2007. The son of Łukasz, he has a younger brother.

== Club career ==
As a youth player, Miściur joined the youth academy of English side Hull City.

Following his stint there, he joined the youth academy of English Premier League side Liverpool during the summer of 2023, where he played in the UEFA Youth League.

On 28 August 2026, Miścuir signed for Northern Premier League side Leek Town on loan until January 2027.

== International career ==
Miściur is a Poland youth international. On 3 September 2025, he debuted for the Poland national under-19 team during a 6–0 friendly home win over the Faroe Islands.

== Personal life ==
As of 2025, Miściur was sharing a house with teammate and countryman Fabian Mrozek.
