= Liverpool F.C. Reserves and Academy =

Liverpool F.C.'s reserve football team

Liverpool Academy
- Full name: Liverpool Football Club Academy
- Nickname: LFC Academy
- Founded: 1998
- Ground: The Academy, Kirkby
- Manager: Rob Page (U21); Simon Wiles (U18)
- League: Professional Development League
- 2025–26: 12th
- Website: www.liverpoolfc.com
Home colours	Away colours	Third colours

Liverpool F.C. Under-21s is the reserve & senior youth team of Liverpool Football Club. It is the most senior level of the Liverpool academy beneath the first team. In the summer of 2012, the whole English reserve football system was overhauled and replaced with an Under-21 league system, the Professional Development League. Liverpool's reserve team became the Liverpool under-21 team and competes in the Professional Development League 1 which is also known by its sponsorship name of Barclays Under-21 Premier League and Premier League 2. The team generally consists of Under-21 players at the club but at times senior players also play for the reserves when they are recuperating from injury. Following the introduction of new regulations from the 2012–13 season, only three outfield players and one goalkeeper over the age of 21 can play for the reserves regularly.

Liverpool F.C. Academy is the youth set up Liverpool Football Club. It trains players from the U6 age group up to the U21 squad. The academy has separate head coaches in charge of development in the U6-U9, U10-U11, U12-U14 and U15-U16 age groups. At U21 and U18 level there are dedicated coaching teams managed by Michael Beale with the U21 position vacant as of 2 March 2020. Alex Inglethorpe was promoted from U21 manager to Academy Director in the summer of 2014 and holds overall responsibility for operation of the academy. The academy has won the FA Youth Cup, a competition for players of age 15 to 18, four times in 1996, 2006, 2007 and 2019.

Liverpool F.C. Academy is considered to be one of the most effective football academies both in England and in the world. Various current and past Liverpool players have graduated through the academy, including Billy Liddell, Ronnie Moran, Ian Callaghan, Phil Thompson, Robbie Fowler, Steve McManaman, Michael Owen, Jamie Carragher, Steven Gerrard and Trent Alexander-Arnold, among many others.

== Reserve team (Under-21s) ==
Liverpool Under-21s played in Premier League 2. The Reserves won the regional division title in 2000 and again 2008 winning also the national league that year. It competed in the Lancashire Combination from 1896 to 1911, with the exception of the 1898–99 season, in which it joined The Combination. From 1911 on, it took part in the Central League until becoming inaugural members of the Premier Reserve League North in 1999. The team also participated in the Liverpool Senior Cup and the Lancashire Senior Cup; the last time it took part in them was the 2009–10 season when it also won both competitions.

The last reserve team manager was Rodolfo Borrell, who was appointed in July 2011 and led the reserve team during its final season before taking over the newly formed under-21 side in July 2012. The reserves last played their home games at Prenton Park (the home of Tranmere Rovers); in previous seasons the team has also played at the club's academy, the Halliwell Jones Stadium (home of Warrington Wolves), Haig Avenue (the home of Southport), Totally Wicked Stadium (the home of St Helens R.F.C.) and the Racecourse Ground (home of Wrexham).

The most successful Liverpool Reserves manager was Roy Evans. Evans spent most of his playing career as a reserve team player, making only 11 appearances for the first team. After an injury ended his career in 1974, he was appointed manager of the reserves by Bob Paisley. Evans subsequently led the reserves to victory in a series of Central League championships, including three in his first three seasons, a four in a row sequence from 1978, and two more in the early 1980s. Throughout the history of Liverpool FC, many of the club's best known players have progressed through the reserve team. These include people who at one point were first team squad members including Trent Alexander-Arnold, Steven Gerrard, Robbie Fowler, Michael Owen, Steve McManaman, Jamie Carragher and Raheem Sterling.

== The Academy ==
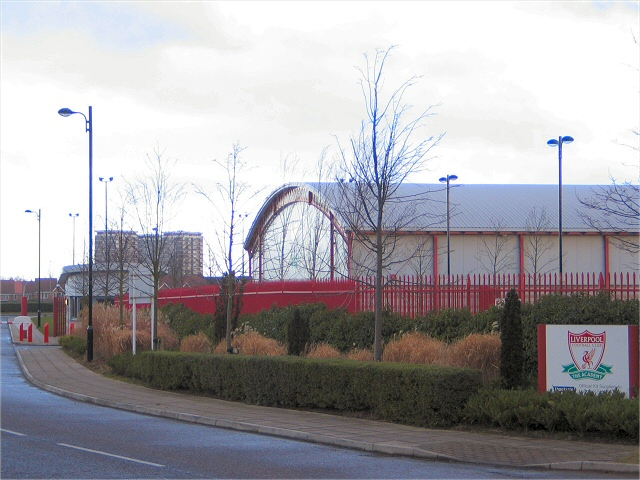
The Academy

In 1998, a new state-of-the-art Youth Academy was opened in Kirkby, Metropolitan Borough of Knowsley. It replaced the older, more informal youth system, and enables the club to focus their youth development and scouting, employing new techniques and FA standards.

Scouts attend many local youth matches looking for talented boys. A boy will then be invited to attend training sessions at the Academy. They are currently taken in as young as the age of six. Former England International player Jamie Carragher started at Liverpool when he was aged just nine, with Michael Owen joining at eleven, and Steven Gerrard joining at the age of eight.

On the walls of the indoor centre hang the words 'Technique', 'Attitude', 'Balance', and 'Speed'. 'TABS' is the key word preached at The Academy. Academy director Alex Inglethorpe has said the remit of the academy is to produce physically, technically, tactically and mentally elite players with enough quality to represent the senior side in the Champions League. Liverpool won the 2005 Champions league with two locally born academy graduates starting in the final.

=== Academy partnerships ===
The Academy has a long-lasting affiliation with MTK Budapest's Sándor Károly Football Academy and maintains a number of football schools worldwide through partnerships with football clubs and commercial and sports organisations. LFC International Football Academy currently has branches in Scandinavia (Norway, Denmark, Sweden, Finland, and Gran Canaria during winter), America (Texas and Plymouth, the latter through an affiliate with CS United Soccer Club), Egypt (Cairo), South Africa (Durban and Johannesburg), China (Guilin), India (Pune, in cooperation with DSK Shivajians), and Japan (Tokyo). Previously schools were also run in Abuja, Belfast, Boston, Charlotte, Cyprus, Dublin, Hong Kong, Iceland, Jakarta, Katwijk, Lisbon, Madrid, Malta, Mumbai, Manila, Nairobi, Saint Vincent, and Singapore.

== Squad ==
As of 6 October 2026

Players listed in bold have made at least one senior first-team appearance.

Note: Flags indicate national team as defined under FIFA eligibility rules; some limited exceptions apply. Players may hold more than one non-FIFA nationality.

No.	Pos.	Nation	Player
40	MF	ENG	Joshua Abe
49	FW	ENG	**Kaide Gordon**
52	DF	ZIM	**Isaac Mabaya**
60	DF	ENG	Noah Adekoya
62	MF	ENG	Joe Bradshaw
63	DF	WAL	**Owen Beck**
65	DF	ENG	**Amara Nallo**
69	MF	HUN	Patrik Farkas
70	MF	ENG	Joe Upton
75	DF	SEN	Mor Talla Ndiaye
79	FW	ENG	Will Wright
80	GK	ENG	Bailey Hall
81	MF	ENG	Oliver O'Connor
82	FW	ENG	Josh Sonni-Lambie
83	DF	ENG	Clae Ewing
85	DF	WAL	Prince Cissé
87	MF	ENG	Ryan Cowley
88	DF	ENG	Lucas Pitt
89	MF	ENG	Alvin Ayman
90	GK	ENG	Matty Wright
91	MF	ENG	Ben Trueman
92	DF	ENG	**Wellity Lucky**
94	MF	ENG	Michael Laffey
99	MF	ENG	Afolami Onanuga
—	GK	ENG	Noah Evans

No.	Pos.	Nation	Player
—	GK	ENG	James Hilditch
—	DF	ENG	Lucas Clarke
—	DF	ENG	Lenix Conde
—	DF	ENG	Joseph Dixon
—	DF	ENG	Shadrach Ekiugbo
—	DF	ENG	DJ Esdaille
—	DF	ENG	Japhecht Garan
—	DF	FRA	Isaiah Garin
—	DF	SCO	Dara Jikiemi
—	DF	NIR	Harry Moran
—	DF	ENG	Harvey Owen
—	DF	ENG	Cian Powney Wain
—	DF	SCO	Cam Williams
—	MF	ENG	Erik Farkas
—	MF	ENG	Max Hawkins
—	MF	ENG	Ellis Hickman
—	MF	ENG	Charlie Huth
—	MF	ENG	La'more Lee Forrester
—	MF	SCO	Daniel Majekodunmi
—	MF	ENG	Haydn Murray-Holme
—	MF	ENG	Charlie Phillips
—	MF	ENG	AJ Yeguo
—	FW	ENG	Zak Coxon
—	FW	ENG	Finn Inglethorpe

=== Other players under contract ===
Note: Flags indicate national team as defined under FIFA eligibility rules; some limited exceptions apply. Players may hold more than one non-FIFA nationality.

No.	Pos.	Nation	Player
71	MF	ENG	**Jay Spearing**

=== Out on loan ===
Note: Flags indicate national team as defined under FIFA eligibility rules; some limited exceptions apply. Players may hold more than one non-FIFA nationality.

No.	Pos.	Nation	Player
48	DF	ENG	**Calum Scanlon** (at Cardiff City until 31 May 2027)
61	MF	SKN	Kyle Kelly (at Forest Green Rovers until 4 January 2027)
64	FW	HON	Keyrol Figueroa (at Port Vale until 31 May 2027)

No.	Pos.	Nation	Player
68	MF	NIR	**Kieran Morrison** (at Sheffield Wednesday until 31 May 2027)
74	GK	POL	Kornel Miściur (at Leek Town until 2 January 2027)
93	GK	POL	Fabian Mrozek (at FC Cincinnati until 31 December 2026)

== Staff ==
=== Current coaching and medical staff ===
- Academy director: Alex Inglethorpe
- Assistent Academy director: Nick Marshall
- Education manager: Caitlin Hawkins
- Academy player care manager: Marek Szmid
- U21s head coach: Rob Page
- U21s player-coach: Jay Spearing
- U21s and Academy goalkeeping coach: Mark Morris
- U21 and loans physiotherapist: Tony Jones
- Head Academy physiotherapist & U21s head physio: Paul Kelly
- U18s head coach: Simon Wiles
- U18s assistant coach: Anthony Ryan
- U18s and Academy goalkeeping coach: Neil Edwards
- U18s education officer: Ted Smith
- U18s Lead physiotherapist: Phil Bolland
- U18s assistant physiotherapist: Gregg Blundell
- Head of pre-academy recruitment: Steve Gorst
- Pre-Academy co-coordinator: Ricky Heywood
- Assistant head of pre-Academy coach: Roy Smith
- Assistant Academy recruitment co-ordinator: Frederico Paciencia
- Individual technical coach: Gareth Cook
- Individual development lead coach: Scott Mason
- Young development phase coach: Bafode Diakhaby
- Academy kit manager: Aubrey Rogers
- U16s head coach: Lewis Nightingale
- U16s assistent coach: Tom Clayton
- U15s coach: Daniel Brathwaite
- U14s head coach: John Miles
- U13s head coach: Michael Yates
- U12s head coach: Phil Charnock
- U11s head coach: Sean Williams
- U10s head coach: Gephte Mbolokele
- U9s head coach: Josh Wesselby
- Head of coaching for foundation stage: John Thompson
- Lead pre-Academy coach: James Williams
- Academy advanced coaching centre co-ordinator: Jon Newby

In addition, the Academy employ staff from the first-team.

=== Reserve team manager history ===
- (England) Bob Paisley (1954–1957)
- (England) Joe Fagan (1957–1974)
- (England) Roy Evans (1975–1984)
- (England) Chris Lawler (1984–1986)
- (England) Phil Thompson (1986–1992)
- (England) Sammy Lee (1993–1998)
- (England) Joe Corrigan (1998–2002)
- (England) Hughie McAuley (2003–2006)
- (England) Gary Ablett (2006–2009)
- (England) John McMahon (2009–2011)
- (Spain) José Segura (caretaker) (2011)
- (Spain) Rodolfo Borrell (2011–2012)
- (England) Alex Inglethorpe (2012–2014)
- (England) Michael Beale (2014–2016)
- (England) Mike Garrity (caretaker) (2016–2017)
- (England) Neil Critchley (2017–2020)
- (England) Barry Lewtas (2020–2025)
- (Wales) Rob Page (2025–present)

== Awards ==
=== Liverpool Academy Players' Player of the Year ===
Players in bold are still playing for Liverpool.

Season	Name	Nationality	Position	Ref(s)
2013–14	Jordan Rossiter	England	Midfielder	
2014–15	João Carlos Teixeira	Portugal	Midfielder	
2015–16	Brad Smith	Australia	Defender	
2016–17	Trent Alexander-Arnold	England	Defender	
2017–18	Harry Wilson	Wales	Winger	

== Honours ==
=== Reserves ===
League Champions

- The Central League: 16
  (1956–57, 1968–69, 1969–70, 1970–71, 1972–73, 1973–74, 1974–75, 1975–76, 1976–77, 1978–79, 1979–80, 1980–81, 1981–82, 1983–84, 1984–85, 1989–90,
- Premier Reserve League National: 1
  (2007–08)
- Premier Reserve League North: 2
  (1999–2000, 2007–08)
- Lancashire Combination: 2
  (1896–97, 1899–1900)

Cup Winners

- Liverpool Senior Cup: 40
  (1893, 1901, 1902, 1903, 1905, 1907, 1909, 1910*, 1912*, 1913, 1915, 1920, 1925, 1927, 1929, 1930, 1934*, 1936*, 1937, 1939, 1942, 1943, 1946, 1947, 1948, 1951, 1952, 1962, 1964*, 1968, 1977, 1980, 1981, 1982*, 1997, 1998, 2002, 2004, 2009, 2010)
- Lancashire Senior Cup: 13
  (1919, 1920*, 1924, 1931, 1933, 1944, 1947, 1956, 1959, 1973, 2010, 2017, 2022)
- Liverpool Challenge Cup: 4
  (1954, 1959, 1960, 1961)

=== Youth ===
League Champions

- Lancashire League Division One: 6
  (1965–66, 1967–68, 1968–69, 1971–72, 1977–78, 1982–83)
- Lancashire League Division Two: 7
  (1961–62, 1965–66, 1967–68, 1972–73, 1975–76, 1976–77, 1992–93)
- Lancashire League Division Three: 1
  (1960–61)

Cup Winners

- FA Youth Cup: 4
  (1996, 2006, 2007, 2019)
- Liverpool Youth Cup: 3
  (1954, 1956, 1958)
- Lancashire Division One League Cup: 3
  (1960, 1966, 1967)
- Lancashire Division Two League Cup: 5
  (1962, 1966, 1967, 1973, 1980)
- Lancashire Division Three League Cup: 1
  (1961)

*Asterisk denotes a shared title.

== Noted graduates ==
=== Established at Liverpool ===
Liverpool's youth system has only seen moderate success over the years; with only a few players who have come through it have gone on to feature in the first-team. The following players have gone on to play over ten competitive matches for the first team.

Pre-WW2

- (England) Harold Barton
- (England) Cyril Done
- (England) Alf Hanson
- (England) Jack Parkinson
- (England) Syd Roberts

1940s

- (England) Bill Jones
- (Scotland) Billy Liddell
- (England) Jimmy Payne
- (England) Eddie Spicer

1950s

- (England) Alan A'Court
- (England) Eric Anderson
- (England) Gerry Byrne
- (England) Bobby Campbell
- (England) Don Campbell
- (England) Jimmy Melia
- (England) Ronnie Moran
- (England) Roy Saunders

1960s

- (England) Alf Arrowsmith
- (England) Phil Boersma
- (England) Ian Callaghan
- (Scotland) Bobby Graham
- (England) Chris Lawler
- (Scotland) Ian Ross
- (England) Tommy Smith
- (England) Phil Thompson

1970s

- (England) Jimmy Case
- (England) David Fairclough
- (England) Colin Irwin
- (England) Sammy Lee
- (England) John McLaughlin

1980s

- (England) Gary Ablett
- (England) Mike Marsh
- (Republic of Ireland) Steve Staunton
- (Republic of Ireland) Ronnie Whelan

1990s

- (England) Jamie Carragher
- (England) Robbie Fowler
- (England) Steven Gerrard
- (Scotland) Dominic Matteo
- (England) Steve McManaman
- (England) Michael Owen
- (England) David Thompson
- (England) Stephen Wright

2000s

- (Spain) Dani Pacheco
- (Republic of Ireland) Darren Potter
- (Argentina) Emiliano Insúa
- (England) Jay Spearing
- (England) Martin Kelly
- (England) Neil Mellor
- (England) Stephen Warnock

2010s

- (England) Andre Wisdom
- (Australia) Brad Smith
- (England) Jack Robinson
- (England) Jon Flanagan
- (England) Jordon Ibe
- (Spain) Pedro Chirivella
- (England) Raheem Sterling
- (Spain) Suso
- (England) Sheyi Ojo
- (England) Trent Alexander-Arnold
- (Wales) Ben Woodburn
- (England) Curtis Jones
- (Wales) Neco Williams
- (Republic of Ireland) Caoimhín Kelleher

2020s

- (England) Nathaniel Phillips
- (England) Rhys Williams
- (Northern Ireland) Conor Bradley
- (Spain) Stefan Bajcetic
- (England) Bobby Clark
- (England) James McConnell
- (England) Jarell Quansah
- (England) Jayden Danns
- (England) Rio Ngumoha
- (England) Trey Nyoni
- (England) Tyler Morton
- (Wales) Lewis Koumas

=== Established elsewhere ===
Many of the former Liverpool youth and reserve team players have found success with other clubs. None of these players became established members of the Liverpool first team.

1950s

- (England) Joe Maloney
- (England) Keith Burkinshaw

1960s

- (Scotland) Ted MacDougall

1970s

- (England) John Gidman
- (England) Tommy Tynan

1980s

- (England) Alan Harper
- (England) Colin Russell
- (England) Craig Hignett
- (England) Dave Watson
- (England) Howard Gayle
- (England) John Durnin
- (England) Mark Seagraves
- (England) Mike Newell
- (England) Nigel Adkins
- (England) Paul Jewell
- (Republic of Ireland) Brian Mooney
- (Republic of Ireland) Ken DeMange
- (Republic of Ireland) Kevin Sheedy

1990s

- (Australia) Nicky Rizzo
- (England) Alex Watson
- (England) Phil Charnock
- (England) Ryan Lowe
- (Northern Ireland) Jim Magilton
- (Scotland) Paul Dalglish
- (Trinidad and Tobago) Tony Warner
- (Wales) Danny Williams
- (Wales) Gareth Roberts
- (Wales) Jason Koumas

2000s

- (Austria) Besian Idrizaj
- (England) Adam Hammill
- (England) Alan Navarro
- (England) Calum Woods
- (England) Charlie Barnett
- (England) Craig Lindfield
- (England) Danny Guthrie
- (England) Danny O'Donnell
- (England) David Mannix
- (England) David Raven
- (England) Ian Dawes
- (England) Jack Hobbs
- (England) James Smith
- (England) Jon Newby
- (England) Jon Otsemobor
- (England) Lee Peltier
- (England) Max Harrop
- (England) Michael Burns
- (England) Paul Anderson
- (England) Ray Putterill
- (England) Ryan Crowther
- (England) Sean Highdale
- (England) Steven Gillespie
- (England) Steven Irwin
- (Spain) Antonio Barragán
- (Spain) Daniel Ayala
- (Spain) Francisco Manuel Duran
- (Spain) Godwin Antwi
- (Spain) Miki Roqué
- (Finland) Daniel Sjölund
- (Germany) Christopher Buchtmann
- (Germany) Marvin Pourié
- (Republic of Ireland) Jimmy Ryan
- (Republic of Ireland) Richie Partridge
- (Republic of Ireland) Shane O'Connor
- (Paraguay) Ronald Huth
- (Scotland) Ryan Flynn
- (Sweden) Astrit Ajdarević
- (United States) Zak Whitbread
- (Wales) Layton Maxwell

2010s

- (Argentina) Gerardo Bruna
- (Australia) Dean Bouzanis
- (Australia) Jake Brimmer
- (Bulgaria) Nikolay Mihaylov
- (Czech Republic) Jakub Sokolík
- (Denmark) Martin Hansen
- (Denmark) Nikola Saric
- (Democratic Republic of the Congo) Henoc Mukendi
- (England) Adam Morgan
- (England) Adam Phillips
- (England) Alex Whittle
- (England) Andy Firth
- (England) Anthony Glennon
- (England) Anthony Gordon
- (England) Cameron Brannagan
- (England) Connor Randall
- (England) Conor Coady
- (England) Craig Roddan
- (England) Daniel Trickett-Smith
- (England) David Amoo
- (England) Herbie Kane
- (England) Isaac Christie-Davies
- (England) Jack Dunn
- (England) Jason Banton
- (England) Jerome Sinclair
- (England) Joe Maguire
- (England) Jordan Lussey
- (England) Jordan Rossiter
- (England) Lloyd Jones
- (England) Matty Virtue
- (England) Michael Ihiekwe
- (England) Michael Ngoo
- (England) Nathan Eccleston
- (England) Ovie Ejaria
- (England) Robbie Threlfall
- (England) Ryan Kent
- (England) Sam Hart
- (England) Shamal George
- (England) Stephen Darby
- (England) Tom Brewitt
- (England) Tom Ince
- (England) Tyrell Belford
- (England) Yan Dhanda
- (Spain) Emmanuel Mendy
- (Spain) Madger Gomes
- (Spain) Mikel San José
- (Spain) Rafael Páez
- (Spain) Sergi Canós
- (Finland) Lauri Dalla Valle
- (Finland) Patrik Raitanen
- (Germany) Stephen Sama
- (Guinea-Bissau) Toni Silva
- (Guinea-Bissau) Yalany Baio
- (Hungary) András Simon
- (Hungary) Kristóf Polgár
- (Hungary) Krisztián Adorján
- (Hungary) Krisztián Németh
- (Hungary) Patrik Poór
- (Hungary) Péter Gulácsi
- (Hungary) Zsolt Pölöskei
- (Republic of Ireland) Alex O'Hanlon
- (Republic of Ireland) Conor Masterson
- (Republic of Ireland) Corey Whelan
- (Republic of Ireland) Daniel Cleary
- (Republic of Ireland) Joseph Rafferty
- (Iceland) Kristján Emilsson
- (Iceland) Victor Pálsson
- (Netherlands) Bobby Adekanye
- (Nigeria) Emeka Obi
- (Norway) Thelo Aasgaard
- (Norway) Edvard Tagseth
- (Northern Ireland) Ryan McLaughlin
- (Portugal) João Carlos Teixeira
- (Portugal) Paulo Alves
- (Portugal) Rafael Camacho
- (Portugal) Toni Gomes
- (Scotland) Alex Cooper
- (Scotland) Gary Mackay-Steven
- (Scotland) George Johnston
- (Scotland) Ryan Fulton
- (Sweden) Alexander Kačaniklić
- (Sweden) Kristoffer Peterson
- (Turkey) Yusuf Mersin
- (United States) Brooks Lennon
- (United States) Marc Pelosi
- (United States) Villyan Bijev
- (Wales) Danny Ward
- (Wales) Harry Wilson
- (Wales) Jordan Williams

2020s

- (Algeria) Yasser Larouci
- (Bosnia and Herzegovina) Dal Varešanović
- (England) Adam Lewis
- (England) Harvey Blair
- (England) Herbie Kane
- (England) Jack Bearne
- (England) Jake Cain
- (England) Kane Drummond
- (England) Layton Stewart
- (England) Leighton Clarkson
- (England) Liam Coyle
- (England) Luis Longstaff
- (England) Oludare Olufunwa
- (England) Paul Glatzel
- (England) Remi Savage
- (England) Tom Clayton
- (France) Billy Koumetio
- (Netherlands) Ki-Jana Hoever
- (Poland) Mateusz Musiałowski
- (Sri Lanka) Sam Durrant
- (Wales) Morgan Boyes
- (Wales) Vimal Yoganathan

== Sources ==
- Who's Who of Liverpool (2006): Tony Matthews
- LFCHistory.net
