= Trey Nyoni =

English footballer (born 2007)

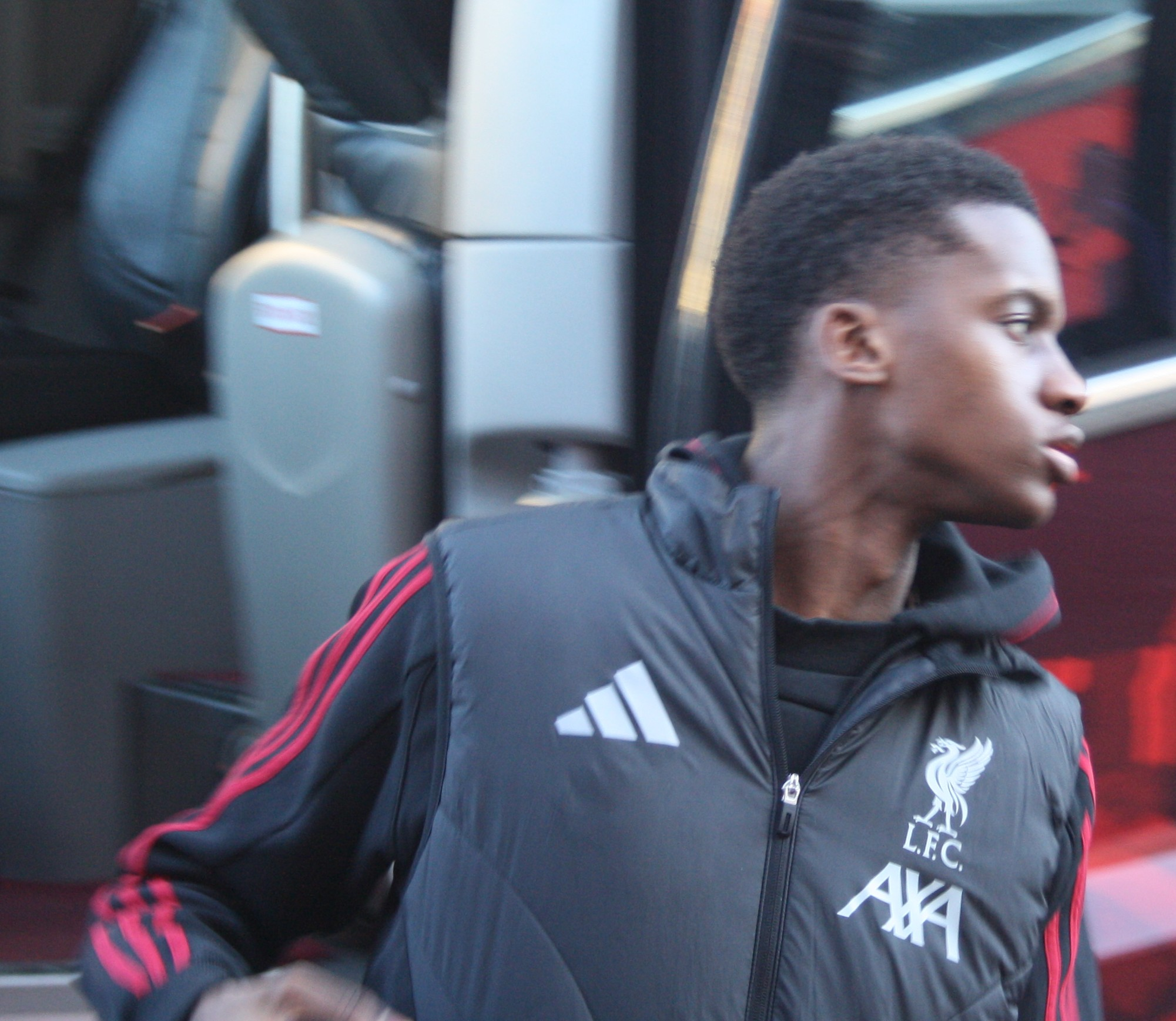
- Nyoni with Liverpool in 2026

Personal information
- Full name: Treymaurice Nyoni
- Date of birth: 30 June 2007 (age 19)
- Place of birth: Reading, England
- Height: 5 ft 11 in (1.80 m)
- Position: Midfielder

Team information
- Current team: Liverpool
- Number: 42

Youth career
- 2013–2023: Leicester City
- 2023–2025: Liverpool

Senior career*
Years	Team	Apps	(Gls)
2024–	Liverpool	15	(0)

International career^{‡}
2022–2024	England U16	7	(1)
2023	England U17	1	(0)
2024–	England U18	10	(3)
2024–	England U19	13	(1)
2025–	England U20	4	(0)
2026–	England U21	2	(0)
- * Club domestic league appearances and goals as of 18:45, 22 November 2026 (UTC) ‡ National team caps and goals as of 12:44, 16 November 2026 (UTC)

Treymaurice Nyoni (born 30 June 2007) is an English professional footballer who plays as a midfielder for Premier League club Liverpool.

== Club career ==
A central midfield player, Nyoni was in the youth system at Leicester City. He played for their under-18 side at the age of 15 years-old and scored twice in 13 appearances in the Under-18 Premier League during the 2022–23 season. He signed for Liverpool in September 2023. The two clubs reportedly could not agree on a fee which had to be set by a tribunal. In September 2023, he scored the winner for Liverpool under-18s against Everton under-18s.

In October 2023, it was reported that after impressing for the Liverpool youth sides he had begun training with the first team under Jürgen Klopp. In November 2023, he made his debut for the Liverpool under-21 side in Premier League 2.

Nyoni made his Liverpool U-21 debut in the EFL Trophy, away at Barrow on 7 November 2023. He was included in a Premier League match day squad for the first time on 12 November 2023, as an unused substitute in a 3–0 home win over Brentford. On 28 February 2024, he made his first team debut as a substitute for Harvey Elliott, in the FA Cup tie against Southampton, helping Liverpool to a 3–0 victory. He became the youngest player ever to feature in the competition for his club, aged 16 years 243 days.

Nyoni signed his first professional contract with Liverpool on 15 October 2024. He was included in the Liverpool first-team squad for the UEFA Champions League tie against PSV Eindhoven on 29 January 2025 and was named amongst the match-day substitutes. His appearance as a second-half replacement for Andy Robertson at the age of 17 years and 213 days made him the club's youngest-ever player in European competition breaking the record set by Phil Charnock, who was 17 years and 215 days old in the European Cup Winners' Cup in 1992.

Nyoni made his Premier League debut on 20 December 2025, coming on as a late substitute for Florian Wirtz in a 2–1 win against Tottenham Hotspur. Nyoni secured his first senior goal for Liverpool on 4 November 2026 in a 3–2 Champions League defeat to Fenerbahçe at Şükrü Saracoğlu Stadium. In doing so at the age of 19 years and 127 days, he became Liverpool's second youngest goalscorer in the competition, behind only Trent Alexander-Arnold in 2017.

== International career ==
Nyoni is eligible to play for England, the country of his birth, or Zimbabwe through his parents. Nyoni scored and assisted a goal on his debut for England U16 in August 2022, a 3–2 victory over Italy U16. Nyoni was called up to the England U17 team in October 2023.

On 22 March 2024, Nyoni made his England U18 debut during a 2–1 victory over the Czech Republic in the U18 Super Cup at Pinatar Arena.

On 16 November 2024, Nyoni made his U19 debut during a 2025 UEFA European Under-19 Championship qualification victory over Bulgaria.

On 21 March 2025, Nyoni debuted for the England U20s during a 1–1 draw with Portugal.

On 1 October 2026, Nyoni was called up to England U21 to replace Jobe Bellingham who withdrew from the squad with injury.

== Style of play ==
Nyoni has been described as a No. 8 with good balance, capable of playing with both feet and having the ability to beat his marker on either side. At an early age, he has drawn comparisons to a young Paul Pogba due to his 'similar confidence and composure', 'tall, slender' build, and 'skillful, intelligent' ability. He's quick on both feet with great composure on the ball and has shown his confidence in the FA Cup.

== Personal life ==
Nyoni was born in Reading and grew up in Leicester. He is of Zimbabwean descent. His younger brother Ryse is in the academy at Leicester City.

== Career statistics ==
As of match played 22 November 2026

Appearances and goal by club, season and competition
Club	Season	League			FA Cup		EFL Cup		Europe		Other		Total	
Club	Season	Division	Apps	Goals	Apps	Goals	Apps	Goals	Apps	Goals	Apps	Goals	Apps	Goals
Liverpool U21	2023–24	—			—		—		—		2 (Note: Appearances in EFL Trophy)	0	2	0
Liverpool	2023–24	Premier League	0	0	1	0	0	0	0	0	—		1	0
Liverpool	2024–25	Premier League	0	0	2	0	2	0	1 (Note: Appearance(s) in UEFA Champions League)	0	—		5	0
Liverpool	2025–26	Premier League	6	0	3	0	2	0	3	0	0	0	14	0
Liverpool	2026–27	Premier League	9	0	0	0	2	0	3	1	—		14	1
Liverpool	Total		15	0	6	0	6	0	7	1	0	0	34	1
Career total			15	0	6	0	6	0	7	1	2	0	36	1

== Honours ==
Liverpool

- EFL Cup: 2023–24

England U18s

- U18 Pinatar Super Cup: 2024
