= Pepijn Lijnders =

Dutch football manager (born 1983)

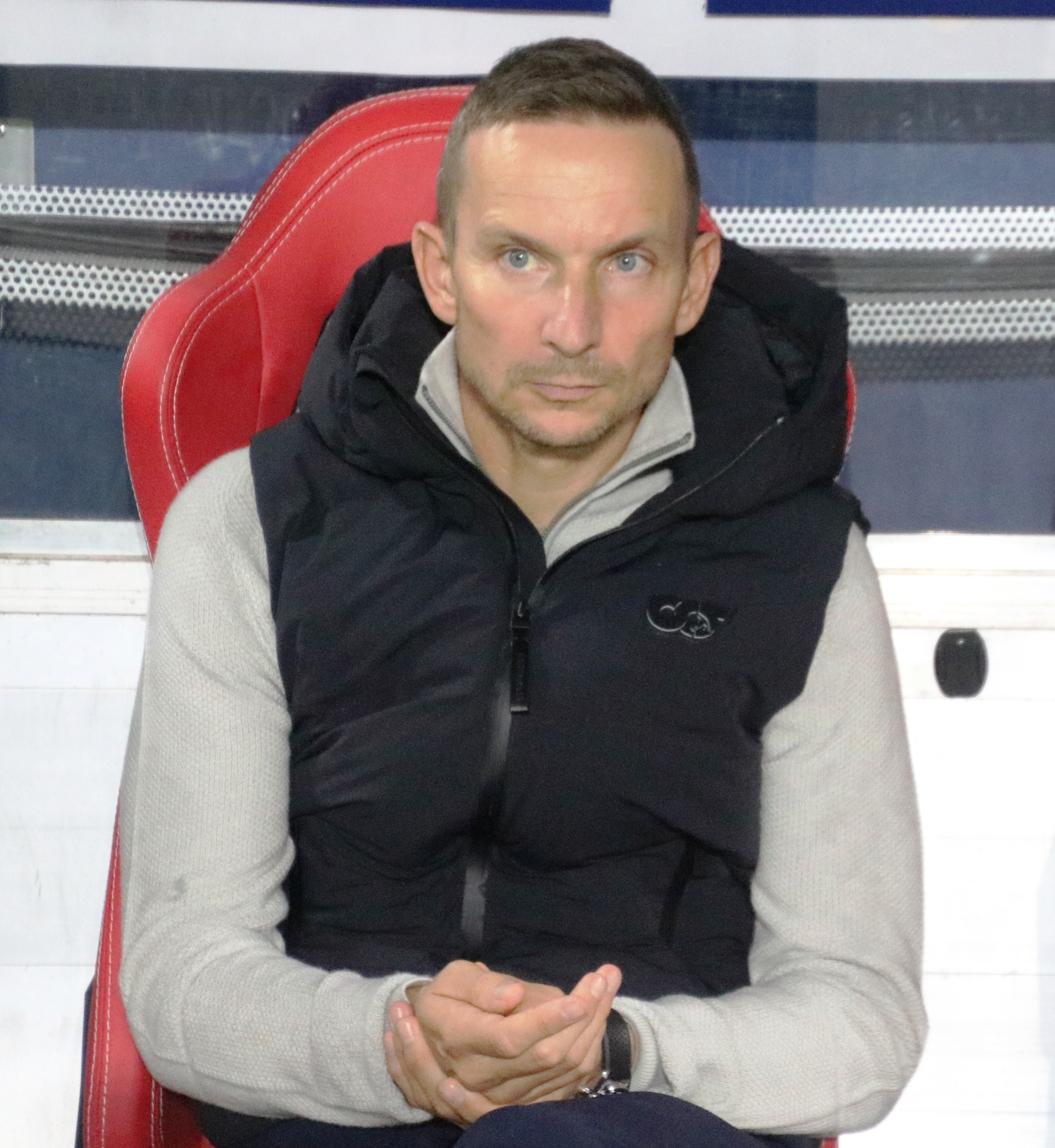
- Lijnders in 2024

Personal information
- Date of birth: 24 January 1983 (age 43)
- Place of birth: Broekhuizen, Netherlands

Team information
- Current team: Germany (assistant manager)

Managerial career
- Years: Team
- 2018: NEC
- 2024: Red Bull Salzburg

Pepijn Lijnders (born 24 January 1983) is a Dutch professional football manager who is the assistant manager of the Germany national team.

He has predominantly worked as a coach, including spending two spells as Jurgen Klopp's assistant at Liverpool. He has also had spells as manager of both NEC and Red Bull Salzburg.

== Coaching career ==
=== Early career ===
Lijnders began his managerial career in 2002 with PSV Eindhoven, helping with youth training and individual player development. In 2006, he moved to Porto and helped develop their youth academy, working under guidance of Vítor Frade and Luís Castro. During his time in the club he worked under Jesualdo Ferreira, André Villas-Boas, Vítor Pereira and Paulo Fonseca.

=== Liverpool ===
In 2014, Lijnders moved to Liverpool as development coach under Brendan Rodgers, and later continued with Jürgen Klopp as assistant coach, as well as first-team trainer with Klopp.

=== NEC Nijmegen ===
On 2 January 2018, Lijnders accepted the managerial job at NEC in the Dutch Eerste Divisie, signing a 1.5-year contract. On 17 May 2018, he was dismissed after NEC failed to gain promotion to the Eredivisie in the promotion play-offs.

=== Return to Liverpool ===
Lijnders returned to the Liverpool coaching staff on 5 June 2018. He was part of the coaching staff that helped Liverpool win their sixth UEFA Champions League on 1 June 2019, their first FIFA Club World Cup on 21 December 2019, and the Premier League title at the end of the 2019–20 season.

In 2022, Lijnders published his first book, Intensity: Our Identity, an inside account of Liverpool's 2021–22 season. Later that year, Lijnders defended himself against suggestions that his book had "exposed" Liverpool's secrets.

On 26 January 2024, it was announced that, along with Jürgen Klopp, Lijnders would be leaving Liverpool at the end of the season. Lijnders was expected to pursue his own managerial career after his departure from Liverpool.

=== Red Bull Salzburg ===
On 15 May 2024, Lijnders signed a contract as the new Red Bull Salzburg manager. Early in the 2024–25 season, Lijnders faced criticism after he demoted Austria's national team goalkeeper Alexander Schlager to the bench, fielding Janis Blaswich on loan from Leipzig. Blaswich conceded 12 goals in Salzburg's first three Champions League games. On 16 December 2024, it was announced that Salzburg were parting ways with Lijnders after 29 games in charge of the club with Salzburg chasing a 10-point deficit in the Austrian Bundesliga.

=== Manchester City ===
On 10 June 2025, Lijnders was announced as Pep Guardiola's new assistant manager at Manchester City. In May 2026, it was announced he would depart the club alongside Guardiola.

=== Germany ===
On 24 July 2026, Lijnders was appointed assistant coach of the Germany national team under Jürgen Klopp.

== Managerial statistics ==
As of match played 14 December 2024

Managerial record by team and tenure
Team	From	To	Record							
Team	From	To	G	W	D	L	GF	GA	GD	Win %
NEC	3 January 2018	17 May 2018	22	11	4	7	39	29	+10	50.00
Red Bull Salzburg	1 July 2024	16 December 2024	29	13	7	9	50	42	+8	44.83
Career total			51	24	11	16	89	71	+18	47.06

== Honours ==
=== Assistant Manager ===
Liverpool

- Premier League: 2019-20
- FA Cup: 2021-22
- EFL Cup: 2021-22, 2023-24
- FA Community Shield: 2022
- UEFA Champions League: 2018-19
- UEFA Super Cup: 2019
- FIFA Club World Cup: 2019

Manchester City

- EFL Cup: 2025-26
- FA Cup: 2025-26
