= 2024–25 Liverpool F.C. season =

English football club season

Liverpool
2024–25 season
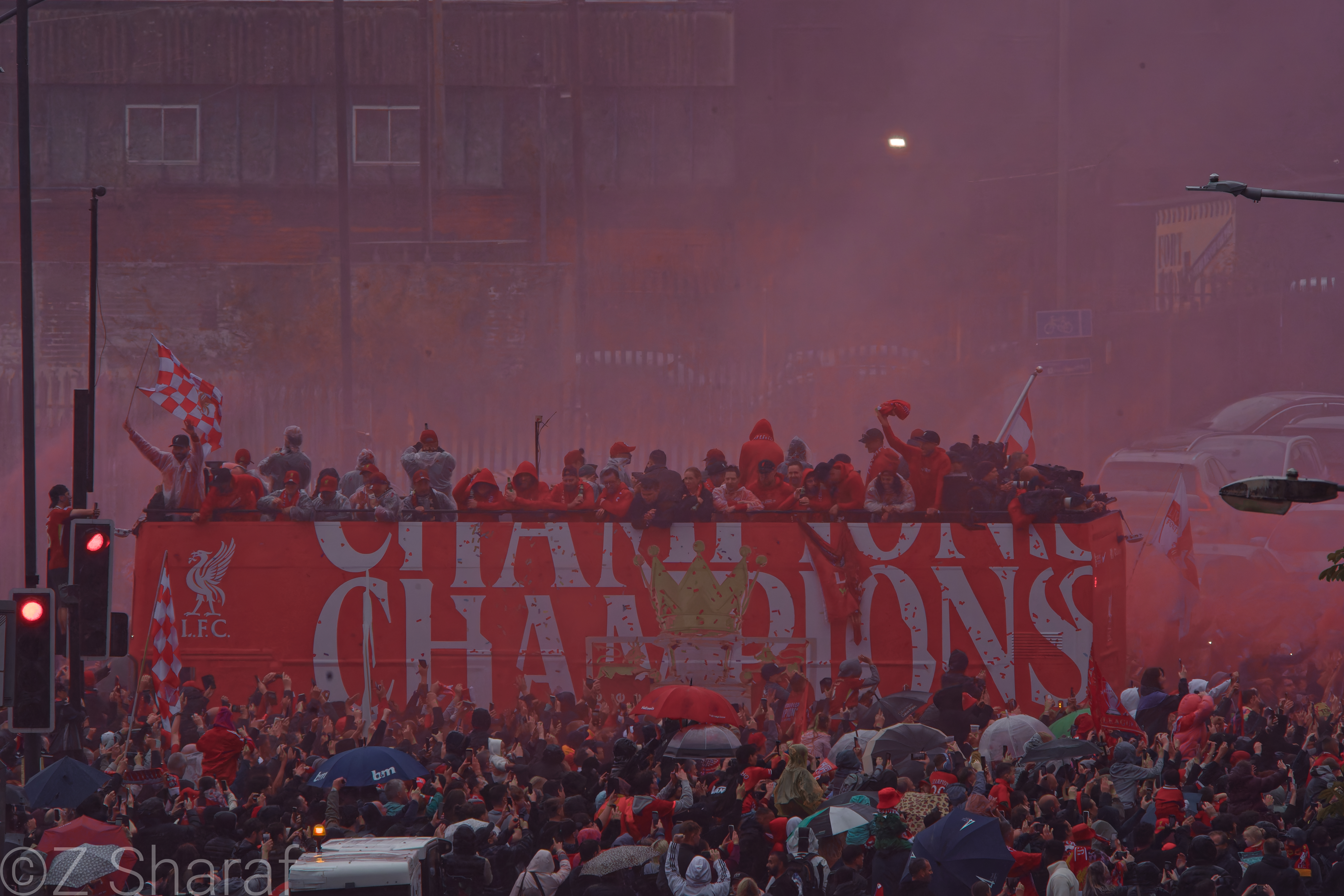
- Liverpool parading the streets on 26 May 2025 after winning the Premier League
- Owner: Fenway Sports Group
- Chairman: Tom Werner
- Head coach: Arne Slot
- Stadium: Anfield
- Premier League: 1st
- FA Cup: Fourth round
- EFL Cup: Runners-up
- UEFA Champions League: Round of 16
- Top goalscorer: League: Mohamed Salah (29); All: Mohamed Salah (34)
- Highest home attendance: 60,420 (v. Ipswich Town, Premier League, 25 January 2025)
- Lowest home attendance: 59,546 (v. Real Madrid, UEFA Champions League, 27 November 2024)
- Average home league attendance: 60,330
- Biggest win: 5–0 v. West Ham United (A); Premier League, 29 December 2024
- Biggest defeat: 1–3 v. Chelsea (A); Premier League, 4 May 2025
Home colours	Away colours	Third colours

The 2024–25 season was Liverpool Football Club's 133rd season in their history and their 63rd consecutive season in the top flight of English football. In addition to the domestic league, the club also participated in the FA Cup, the EFL Cup, and the UEFA Champions League. This was Liverpool's first season under new head coach Arne Slot, who was announced as Jürgen Klopp's successor on 20 May 2024.

On 18 January 2025, Liverpool played their 6,000th competitive game since the club's inception in 1892, defeating Brentford 2–0 in the Premier League thanks to two late goals from substitute Darwin Núñez.

On 27 April 2025, Liverpool were crowned Premier League champions after a 5–1 win at home against Tottenham Hotspur, winning their first league title since 2019–20 (and second in the Premier League era), their first in front of fans since 1989–90 and a record-tying 20th English league title. Arne Slot became the seventh manager in history to win the Premier League in their first season (and the first since 2016–17). In addition to winning the league, Liverpool scored in every away game in a league campaign for the first time in club history.

On 25 May 2025, Liverpool were presented with the Premier League trophy after a 1–1 home draw with Crystal Palace on the final day of the season. However, their title celebrations were overshadowed during their victory parade the following day on 26 May, when a car drove into the crowd, injuring many spectators shortly after the parade had finished. This season also tragically marked the final campaign for Diogo Jota, who died along with his brother André Silva in a car accident on 3 July 2025.

== First-team squad ==
This season was the first since 2015–16 without Joël Matip, and the first since 2019–20 without Thiago Alcântara, who both retired from professional football after their contracts expired.

No.	Player	Nationality	Date of birth (age)	Signed from	Apps	Goals	Assists
Goalkeepers
1	Alisson Becker	(Brazil)	2 October 1992 (aged 32)	(Italy) Roma	298	1	3
56	Vítězslav Jaroš	(Czech Republic)	23 July 2001 (aged 23)	(England) LFC Academy	2	0	0
62	Caoimhín Kelleher	(Republic of Ireland)	23 November 1998 (aged 26)	(England) LFC Academy	67	0	0
95	Harvey Davies	(England)	3 September 2003 (aged 21)	(England) LFC Academy	0	0	0
Defenders
2	Joe Gomez	(England)	23 May 1997 (aged 28)	(England) Charlton Athletic	241	0	9
4	Virgil van Dijk (captain)	(Netherlands)	8 July 1991 (aged 33)	(England) Southampton	319	28	11
5	Ibrahima Konaté	(France)	25 May 1999 (aged 26)	(Germany) RB Leipzig	132	5	4
21	Kostas Tsimikas	(Greece)	12 May 1996 (aged 29)	(Greece) Olympiacos	115	0	18
26	Andy Robertson	(Scotland)	11 March 1994 (aged 31)	(England) Hull City	342	11	67
66	Trent Alexander-Arnold (vice-captain)	(England)	7 October 1998 (aged 26)	(England) LFC Academy	354	23	86
78	Jarell Quansah	(England)	29 January 2003 (aged 22)	(England) LFC Academy	58	3	3
84	Conor Bradley	(Northern Ireland)	9 July 2003 (aged 21)	(England) LFC Academy	57	1	11
Midfielders
3	Wataru Endo	(Japan)	9 February 1993 (aged 32)	(Germany) VfB Stuttgart	75	2	1
8	Dominik Szoboszlai	(Hungary)	25 October 2000 (aged 24)	(Germany) RB Leipzig	94	15	12
10	Alexis Mac Allister	(Argentina)	24 December 1998 (aged 26)	(England) Brighton & Hove Albion	95	14	13
17	Curtis Jones	(England)	30 January 2001 (aged 24)	(England) LFC Academy	179	19	19
19	Harvey Elliott	(England)	4 April 2003 (aged 22)	(England) Fulham	147	15	17
38	Ryan Gravenberch	(Netherlands)	16 May 2002 (aged 23)	(Germany) Bayern Munich	87	4	6
80	Tyler Morton	(England)	31 October 2002 (aged 22)	(England) LFC Academy	14	0	1
Forwards
7	Luis Díaz	(Colombia)	13 January 1997 (aged 28)	(Portugal) Porto	148	41	16
9	Darwin Núñez	(Uruguay)	24 June 1999 (aged 26)	(Portugal) Benfica	143	40	22
11	Mohamed Salah	(Egypt)	15 June 1992 (aged 33)	(Italy) Roma	401	245	110
14	Federico Chiesa	(Italy)	25 October 1997 (aged 27)	(Italy) Juventus	14	2	1
18	Cody Gakpo	(Netherlands)	7 May 1999 (aged 26)	(Netherlands) PSV	128	41	14
20	Diogo Jota	(Portugal)	4 December 1996 (aged 28)	(England) Wolverhampton Wanderers	182	65	22

=== New contracts ===
Date	Pos.	No.	Player	Date until	Ref.
7 October 2024	DF	78	(England) Jarell Quansah	30 June 2030	
4 February 2025	FW	76	(England) Jayden Danns	Undisclosed	
11 April 2025	FW	11	(Egypt) Mohamed Salah	30 June 2027	
17 April 2025	DF	4	(Netherlands) Virgil van Dijk	30 June 2027	
17 May 2025	DF	84	(Northern Ireland) Conor Bradley	30 June 2029	

== Transfers ==
=== In ===
Date	Pos.	No.	Player	From	Fee	Ref.
First team
29 August 2024	FW	14	(Italy) Federico Chiesa	(Italy) Juventus	£10,000,000 (Note: Fee may eventually rise to £12,500,000.)	
▼ Spending: £10,000,000

Note: On 27 August 2024, Liverpool completed a transfer for goalkeeper Giorgi Mamardashvili from Valencia for a reported fee of £25,000,000. Both clubs confirmed that the Georgian international would be joining the Premier League club at the start of the 2025–26 season.

=== Out ===
Date	Pos.	No.	Player	To	Fee	Ref.
First team
30 June 2024	MF	6	(Spain) Thiago Alcântara	Retired		
30 June 2024	GK	13	(Spain) Adrián	(Spain) Real Betis	Free transfer	
30 June 2024	DF	32	(Cameroon) Joël Matip	Retired		
12 August 2024	FW	28	(Portugal) Fábio Carvalho	(England) Brentford	£20,000,000 (Note: Fee may eventually rise to £27,500,000.)	
22 August 2024	MF	42	(England) Bobby Clark	(Austria) Red Bull Salzburg	£10,000,000	
22 August 2024	DF	72	(Netherlands) Sepp van den Berg	(England) Brentford	£20,000,000 (Note: Fee may eventually rise to £25,000,000.)	
Academy
30 June 2024	FW	92	(Poland) Mateusz Musiałowski	(Cyprus) Omonia	Free transfer	
30 June 2024	MF	94	(Germany) Melkamu Frauendorf	(Germany) Hannover 96	Free transfer	
30 June 2024	DF	–	(England) Adam Lewis	(England) Morecambe	Free transfer	
6 July 2024	DF	–	(Colombia) Anderson Arroyo	(Spain) Burgos	Undisclosed	
9 August 2024	DF	89	(France) Billy Koumetio	(Scotland) Dundee	Undisclosed	
23 August 2024	FW	86	(England) Harvey Blair	(England) Portsmouth	£300,000 (Note: Fee may eventually rise to £600,000.)	
6 January 2025	GK	45	(Brazil) Marcelo Pitaluga	(Brazil) Fluminense	Free transfer	
22 January 2025	MF	83	(Wales) Thomas Hill	(England) Harrogate Town	Free transfer	
▲ Income: £55,300,000

=== Loans in ===
Date	Pos.	No.	Player	From	Date until	Ref.
No loans in

=== Loans out ===
Date	Pos.	No.	Player	To	Date until	Ref.
First team
1 July 2024	DF	22	(Scotland) Calvin Ramsay	(England) Wigan Athletic	3 January 2025 (Note: On 3 January 2025, Ramsay was recalled from his loan at Wigan Athletic.)	
20 August 2024	DF	46	(England) Rhys Williams	(England) Morecambe	30 June 2025 (Note: On 2 January 2025, Williams' loan at Morecambe was extended until the 30 June 2025.)	
30 August 2024	MF	43	(Spain) Stefan Bajcetic	(Austria) Red Bull Salzburg	31 January 2025 (Note: On 31 January 2025, Bajcetic has completed a loan switch to Las Palmas.)	
30 August 2024	GK	45	(Brazil) Marcelo Pitaluga	(Scotland) Livingston	6 January 2025 (Note: On 6 January 2025, Pitaluga's season-long loan at Livingston was ended when he transferred to Fluminense.)	
30 August 2024	DF	47	(England) Nat Phillips	(England) Derby County	30 June 2025	
30 August 2024	FW	50	(Scotland) Ben Gannon-Doak	(England) Middlesbrough	30 June 2025	
13 January 2025	DF	22	(Scotland) Calvin Ramsay	(Scotland) Kilmarnock	30 June 2025	
31 January 2025	MF	43	(Spain) Stefan Bajcetic	(Spain) Las Palmas	30 June 2025	
Academy
26 July 2024	GK	93	(Poland) Fabian Mrozek	(Sweden) IF Brommapojkarna	1 January 2025	
6 August 2024	DF	44	(England) Luke Chambers	(England) Wigan Athletic	30 June 2025	
10 August 2024	FW	67	(Wales) Lewis Koumas	(England) Stoke City	30 June 2025	
15 August 2024	MF	91	(England) Luca Stephenson	(Scotland) Dundee United	30 June 2025	
27 August 2024	DF	63	(Wales) Owen Beck	(England) Blackburn Rovers	30 June 2025	
29 August 2024	DF	48	(England) Calum Scanlon	(England) Millwall	30 June 2025	
30 August 2024	FW	49	(England) Kaide Gordon	(England) Norwich City	13 January 2025 (Note: On 13 January 2025, Gordon was recalled from his loan at Norwich City.)	
1 September 2024	GK	75	(Poland) Jakub Ojrzyński	(Cyprus) Spartakos Kitiou	11 November 2024 (Note: On 11 November 2024, Ojrzyński was recalled from his loan at Spartakos Kitiou due to administrative errors from both clubs.)	
3 February 2025	FW	49	(England) Kaide Gordon	(England) Portsmouth	30 June 2025	
3 February 2025	MF	79	(England) Dominic Corness	(England) Gillingham	30 June 2025	
4 February 2025	FW	76	(England) Jayden Danns	(England) Sunderland	30 June 2025	
4 February 2025	GK	93	(Poland) Fabian Mrozek	(England) Forest Green Rovers	30 June 2025	
17 February 2025	DF	77	(England) James Norris	(Republic of Ireland) Shelbourne	30 June 2025	
27 March 2025	GK	75	(Poland) Jakub Ojrzyński	(Sweden) Utsiktens BK	30 June 2025	

== Pre-season and friendlies ==
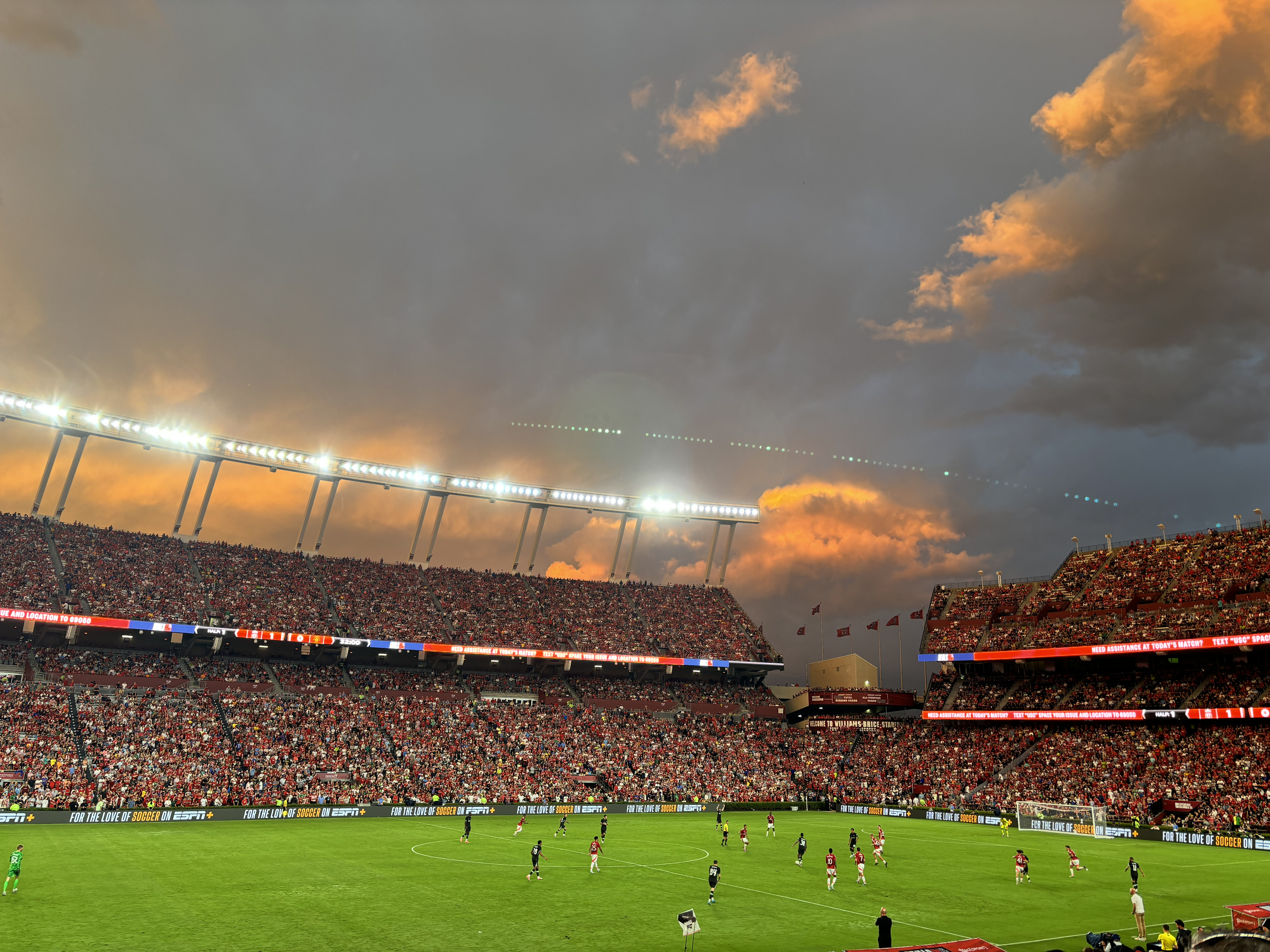
Pre-season friendly match against Manchester United, at Williams–Brice Stadium on 3 August 2024

On 23 February 2024, Liverpool announced they would return to the United States during pre-season, for matches against Arsenal and Manchester United. On 21 June 2024, Liverpool announced they would finish their pre-season programme with a match against La Liga side Sevilla at Anfield. An extra behind-closed-doors friendly against Las Palmas was later confirmed.

Win Draw Loss Fixtures

19 July 2024 BCD Friendly	Liverpool	0–1	Preston North End	Kirkby, England
16:00 BST		Report	Brady 27'	Stadium: Liverpool Training Centre; Attendance: 0 (behind closed doors)

26 July 2024 Friendly	Liverpool	1–0	Real Betis	Pittsburgh, United States
19:30 EDT	Szoboszlai 34'; Endo (yellow card) 44'; Quansah (yellow card) 49'	Report	Ruibal (yellow card) 90+3'	Stadium: Acrisure Stadium; Attendance: 42,679; Referee: Mark Allatin (United States)

31 July 2024 Friendly	Liverpool	2–1	Arsenal	Philadelphia, United States
19:30 EDT	Salah 13'; Carvalho 34'; Endo (yellow card) 80'	Report	Havertz 40'	Stadium: Lincoln Financial Field; Attendance: 69,879; Referee: Ramy Touchan (United States)

3 August 2024 Friendly	Manchester United	0–3	Liverpool	Columbia, United States
19:30 EDT	Fish (yellow card) 69'	Report	Carvalho 10'; Jones 36'; Tsimikas 61'	Stadium: Williams–Brice Stadium; Attendance: 77,559; Referee: Rubiel Vazquez (United States)

11 August 2024 Friendly	Liverpool	4–1	Sevilla	Liverpool, England
12:30 BST	Jota 30'; Díaz 39', 45+1'; Nyoni 67'	Report	Benavides (yellow card) 42'; Peque 66'	Stadium: Anfield; Attendance: 59,122; Referee: Robert Jones (England)
Note: Fixture was initially scheduled for a 15:00 kick-off, but was moved on the club's request.

11 August 2024 Friendly	Liverpool	0–0	Las Palmas	Liverpool, England
17:00 BST	Elliott (yellow card) 12'	Report	Muñoz (yellow card) 12'	Stadium: Anfield; Attendance: 0 (behind closed doors)

== Competitions ==
=== Overall record ===
Competition	First match	Last match	Starting round	Final position	Record							
Competition	First match	Last match	Starting round	Final position	Pld	W	D	L	GF	GA	GD	Win %
Premier League	17 August 2024	25 May 2025	Matchday 1	Winners	38	25	9	4	86	41	+45	65.79
FA Cup	11 January 2025	9 February 2025	Third round	Fourth round	2	1	0	1	4	1	+3	50.00
EFL Cup	25 September 2024	16 March 2025	Third round	Runners-up	6	4	0	2	15	7	+8	66.67
UEFA Champions League	17 September 2024	11 March 2025	League phase	Round of 16	10	8	0	2	18	6	+12	80.00
Total					56	38	9	9	123	55	+68	67.86

Source: Soccerway

=== Premier League ===
On 25 May 2025, Mohamed Salah netted his 29th goal of the league season with an equaliser against Crystal Palace, which marked his 47th goal involvement of the season, setting a new record in a 38-game Premier League season, and equalling the previous record set by Alan Shearer and Andy Cole who did it in 42-game seasons.

==== League table ====
Pos	Team	Pld	W	D	L	GF	GA	GD	Pts	Qualification or relegation
1	Liverpool (C)	38	25	9	4	86	41	+45	84	Qualification for the Champions League league phase (Note: The Premier League gained an additional Champions League place as a result of England gaining one of the two European Performance Spots (EPS) awarded to the two associations with the highest UEFA coefficient points in 2024–25.)
2	Arsenal	38	20	14	4	69	34	+35	74	Qualification for the Champions League league phase
3	Manchester City	38	21	8	9	72	44	+28	71	Qualification for the Champions League league phase
4	Chelsea	38	20	9	9	64	43	+21	69	Qualification for the Champions League league phase
5	Newcastle United	38	20	6	12	68	47	+21	66	Qualification for the Champions League league phase

Source: Premier League
Rules for classification: 1) Points; 2) Goal difference; 3) Goals scored; 4) If the champions, relegated teams or qualified teams for UEFA competitions cannot be determined by rules 1 to 3, rules 4.1 to 4.3 are applied – 4.1) Points gained in head-to-head record between such teams; 4.2) Away goals scored in head-to-head record between such teams; 4.3) Play-offs
(C) Champions

==== Results summary ====
Overall								Home						Away					
Pld	W	D	L	GF	GA	GD	Pts	W	D	L	GF	GA	GD	W	D	L	GF	GA	GD
38	25	9	4	86	41	+45	84	14	4	1	42	16	+26	11	5	3	44	25	+19

Source: Soccerway

==== Results by round ====
Round	1	2	3	4	5	6	7	8	9	10	11	12	13	14	16	17	18	19	20	21	22	23	24	15^{1}	25	29^{2}	26	27	28	30	31	32	33	34	35	36	37	38
Ground	A	H	A	H	H	A	A	H	A	H	H	A	H	A	H	A	H	A	H	A	A	H	A	A	H	A	A	H	H	H	A	H	A	H	A	H	A	H
Result	W	W	W	L	W	W	W	W	D	W	W	W	W	D	D	W	W	W	D	D	W	W	W	D	W	D	W	W	W	W	L	W	W	W	L	D	L	D
Position	3	4	2	4	2	1	1	1	2	1	1	1	1	1	1	1	1	1	1	1	1	1	1	1	1	1	1	1	1	1	1	1	1	1	1	1	1	1
Points	3	6	9	9	12	15	18	21	22	25	28	31	34	35	36	39	42	45	46	47	50	53	56	57	60	61	64	67	70	73	73	76	79	82	82	83	83	84

Source: Premier League
A = Away; H = Home; W = Win; D = Draw; L = Loss; P = Postponed
Notes:
- ^{1} Matchday 15 (v. Everton) was postponed due to severe weather caused by Storm Darragh.
- ^{2} Matchday 29 (v. Aston Villa) was moved forward due to Liverpool's participation in the EFL Cup final.

==== Matches ====
The league fixtures were released on 18 June 2024.

Win Draw Loss Fixtures

17 August 2024 1	Ipswich Town	0–2	Liverpool	Ipswich
12:30 BST	Woolfenden (yellow card) 6'; Hutchinson (yellow card) 13'; Burns (yellow card) 24'	Report	Jota 60'; Salah 65'; Gakpo (yellow card) 90+5'	Stadium: Portman Road; Attendance: 30,014; Referee: Tim Robinson

25 August 2024 2	Liverpool	2–0	Brentford	Liverpool
16:30 BST	Díaz 13'; Szoboszlai (yellow card) 30'; Gravenberch (yellow card) 38'; Salah 70'	Report	Nørgaard (yellow card) 40'; Jensen (yellow card) 45'; Mbeumo (yellow card) 90+4'	Stadium: Anfield; Attendance: 60,107; Referee: Stuart Attwell
Note: Fixture was initially scheduled for 24 August, but was moved for live Sky Sports broadcast.

1 September 2024 3	Manchester United	0–3	Liverpool	Trafford
16:00 BST	Zirkzee (yellow card) 23'; Martínez (yellow card) 40'; Mainoo (yellow card) 45+1'; De Ligt (yellow card) 65'	Report	Díaz 35', 42'; Van Dijk (yellow card) 55'; Salah 56'	Stadium: Old Trafford; Attendance: 73,738; Referee: Anthony Taylor
Note: Fixture was initially scheduled for 31 August, but was moved for live Sky Sports broadcast.

14 September 2024 4	Liverpool	0–1	Nottingham Forest	Liverpool
15:00 BST	Robertson (yellow card) 62'; Gravenberch (yellow card) 83'; Szoboszlai (yellow card) 86'; Alexander-Arnold (yellow card) 90+4'	Report	Moreno (yellow card) 44'; Yates (yellow card) 45+1'; Sels (yellow card) 66'; Hudson-Odoi 72'; Elanga (yellow card) 90+2'	Stadium: Anfield; Attendance: 60,344; Referee: Michael Oliver

21 September 2024 5	Liverpool	3–0	Bournemouth	Liverpool
15:00 BST	Díaz 26', 28'; Núñez 37'; Konaté (yellow card) 60'	Report	Christie (yellow card) 1'; Kluivert (yellow card) 18'; Huijsen (yellow card) 45+3'; Cook (yellow card) 87'	Stadium: Anfield; Attendance: 60,347; Referee: Tony Harrington

28 September 2024 6	Wolverhampton Wanderers	1–2	Liverpool	Wolverhampton
17:30 BST	André (yellow card) 30'; Aït-Nouri 56'; Forbs (yellow card) 87'	Report	Alexander-Arnold (yellow card) 6'; Jota (yellow card) 36'; Konaté 45+2', (yellow card) 63'; Salah 61' (pen.)	Stadium: Molineux Stadium; Attendance: 31,413; Referee: Anthony Taylor
Note: Fixture was initially scheduled for a 15:00 kick-off, but was moved for live Sky Sports broadcast.

5 October 2024 7	Crystal Palace	0–1	Liverpool	Selhurst
12:30 BST	Lerma (yellow card) 71'; Hughes (yellow card) 73'; Sarr (yellow card) 74'; Nketiah (yellow card) 76'	Report	Jota 9'; Gakpo (yellow card) 31'; Mac Allister (yellow card) 43'	Stadium: Selhurst Park; Attendance: 25,185; Referee: Simon Hooper
Note: Fixture was initially scheduled for a 15:00 kick-off, but was moved for live TNT Sports broadcast.

20 October 2024 8	Liverpool	2–1	Chelsea	Liverpool
16:30 BST	Salah 29' (pen.); Szoboszlai (yellow card) 45+8'; Jones 51'; Núñez (yellow card) 69'; Konaté (yellow card) 80'; Mac Allister (yellow card) 90+2'	Report	Adarabioyo (yellow card) 6'; Jackson (yellow card) 28', (goal) 48'; Veiga (yellow card) 78'	Stadium: Anfield; Attendance: 60,277; Referee: John Brooks
Note: Fixture was initially scheduled for 19 October, but was moved for live Sky Sports broadcast.

27 October 2024 9	Arsenal	2–2	Liverpool	Holloway
16:30 GMT	Saka 9'; Merino 43'; Raya (yellow card) 66'; Jesus (yellow card) 90+8'	Report	Van Dijk 18'; Mac Allister (yellow card) 33'; Salah 81'; Núñez (yellow card) 90+4'	Stadium: Emirates Stadium; Attendance: 60,383; Referee: Anthony Taylor
Note: Fixture was initially scheduled for 26 October, but was moved for live Sky Sports broadcast.

2 November 2024 10	Liverpool	2–1	Brighton & Hove Albion	Liverpool
15:00 GMT	Mac Allister (yellow card) 45'; Gakpo 70'; Salah 72'	Report	Kadıoğlu 14', (yellow card) 83'; Verbruggen (yellow card) 90+6'	Stadium: Anfield; Attendance: 60,331; Referee: Tony Harrington

9 November 2024 11	Liverpool	2–0	Aston Villa	Liverpool
20:00 GMT	Núñez 20'; Salah 84'	Report	Rogers (yellow card) 34'; Tielemans (yellow card) 45+3'; Kamara (yellow card) 76'	Stadium: Anfield; Attendance: 60,292; Referee: David Coote
Note: Fixture was initially scheduled for a 15:00 kick-off, but was moved for live TNT Sports broadcast.

24 November 2024 12	Southampton	2–3	Liverpool	Southampton
14:00 GMT	Lallana (yellow card) 23'; Armstrong (penalty missed) 42', 42', (yellow card) 73'; Fernandes 56'; Stephens (yellow card) 90+8'	Report	Bradley (yellow card) 13'; Konaté (yellow card) 16'; Szoboszlai 30'; Gakpo (yellow card) 49'; Salah 65', 83' (pen.), (yellow card) 84'	Stadium: St Mary's Stadium; Attendance: 31,278; Referee: Sam Barrott
Note: Fixture was initially scheduled for 23 November, but was moved for live Sky Sports broadcast.

1 December 2024 13	Liverpool	2–0	Manchester City	Liverpool
16:00 GMT	Gakpo 12'; Gravenberch (yellow card) 36'; Salah 78' (pen.)	Report	Nunes (yellow card) 24'; Foden (yellow card) 32'; Akanji (yellow card) 45+1'	Stadium: Anfield; Attendance: 60,248; Referee: Chris Kavanagh
Note: Fixture was initially scheduled for 30 November, but was moved for live Sky Sports broadcast.

4 December 2024 14	Newcastle United	3–3	Liverpool	Newcastle upon Tyne
19:30 GMT	Isak 35'; Tonali (yellow card) 58'; Gordon 62'; Schär 90'; Pope (yellow card) 90+6'	Report	Mac Allister (yellow card) 20'; Quansah (yellow card) 42'; Gravenberch (yellow card) 45'; Jones 50'; Salah 68', 83'; Alexander-Arnold (yellow card) 69'; Núñez (yellow card) 71'	Stadium: St James' Park; Attendance: 52,237; Referee: Andy Madley
Note: Fixture was initially scheduled for a 19:45 kick-off, but was moved for live Amazon Prime Video broadcast.

14 December 2024 16	Liverpool	2–2	Fulham	Liverpool
15:00 GMT	Díaz (yellow card) 7'; Robertson (red card) 17'; Gakpo 47'; Jones (yellow card) 57'; Jota 86'; Núñez (yellow card) 88'	Report	Diop (yellow card) 1'; Pereira (yellow card) 9', (goal) 11'; Robinson (yellow card) 27'; Muniz 76'; Berge (yellow card) 83'	Stadium: Anfield; Attendance: 60,333; Referee: Tony Harrington

22 December 2024 17	Tottenham Hotspur	3–6	Liverpool	Tottenham
16:30 GMT	Maddison 41'; Kulusevski 72'; Bergvall (yellow card) 79'; Solanke 83'	Report	Díaz 23', 85'; Gakpo (yellow card) 31'; Mac Allister 36'; Szoboszlai 45+1', (yellow card) 52'; Salah 54', 61'	Stadium: Tottenham Hotspur Stadium; Attendance: 61,439; Referee: Sam Barrott
Note: Fixture was initially scheduled for 21 December, but was moved for live Sky Sports broadcast.

26 December 2024 18	Liverpool	3–1	Leicester City	Liverpool
20:00 GMT	Gomez (yellow card) 37'; Gakpo 45+1'; Jones 49'; Robertson (yellow card) 58'; Szoboszlai (yellow card) 80'; Salah 82'	Report	Ayew 6', (yellow card) 43'; Vestergaard (yellow card) 58'	Stadium: Anfield; Attendance: 60,300; Referee: Darren Bond
Note: Fixture was initially scheduled for a 15:00 kick-off, but was moved for live Amazon Prime Video broadcast.

29 December 2024 19	West Ham United	0–5	Liverpool	Stratford
17:15 GMT		Report	Díaz 30'; Gakpo 40'; Salah 44'; Alexander-Arnold 54'; Jota 84'	Stadium: London Stadium; Attendance: 62,476; Referee: Anthony Taylor
Note: Fixture was initially scheduled for a 15:00 kick-off, but was moved for live Sky Sports broadcast.

5 January 2025 20	Liverpool	2–2	Manchester United	Liverpool
16:30 GMT	Gakpo 59'; Salah 70' (pen.); Núñez (yellow card) 76'; Alexander-Arnold (yellow card) 83'	Report	Dalot (yellow card) 23'; Martínez 52'; Amad (yellow card) 53', (goal) 80'; De Ligt (yellow card) 64'; Maguire (yellow card) 73'	Stadium: Anfield; Attendance: 60,275; Referee: Michael Oliver
Note: Fixture was initially scheduled for 4 January, but was moved for live Sky Sports broadcast.

14 January 2025 21	Nottingham Forest	1–1	Liverpool	West Bridgford
20:00 GMT	Wood 8'; Gibbs-White (yellow card) 42'; Yates (yellow card) 53'	Report	Jota 66'; Díaz (yellow card) 70'	Stadium: City Ground; Attendance: 30,249; Referee: Chris Kavanagh
Note: Fixture was initially scheduled for a 19:45 kick-off, but was moved for live TNT Sports broadcast.

18 January 2025 22	Brentford	0–2	Liverpool	Brentford
15:00 GMT	Nørgaard (yellow card) 68'; Roerslev (yellow card) 69'	Report	Tsimikas (yellow card) 8'; Szoboszlai (yellow card) 43'; Núñez 90+1', 90+3', (yellow card) 90+2'	Stadium: Brentford Community Stadium; Attendance: 17,215; Referee: Andy Madley

25 January 2025 23	Liverpool	4–1	Ipswich Town	Liverpool
15:00 GMT	Szoboszlai 11'; Salah 35'; Gakpo 44', 65'	Report	Delap (yellow card) 75'; Enciso (yellow card) 81'; Greaves 90'	Stadium: Anfield; Attendance: 60,420; Referee: Michael Salisbury

1 February 2025 24	Bournemouth	0–2	Liverpool	Bournemouth
15:00 GMT	Christie (yellow card) 48'; Huijsen (yellow card) 55'	Report	Salah 30' (pen.), 75'; Gravenberch (yellow card) 49'; Mac Allister (yellow card) 54'; Van Dijk (yellow card) 66'	Stadium: Dean Court; Attendance: 11,239; Referee: Darren England

12 February 2025 15	Everton	2–2	Liverpool	Liverpool
19:30 GMT	Beto 11'; Lindstrøm (yellow card) 35'; Gueye (yellow card) 37'; Doucouré (yellow card) 45+3' (yellow-red card) 90+14'; Tarkowski 90+8'	Report	Mac Allister 16'; Robertson (yellow card) 27'; Bradley (yellow card) 45+2'; Jones (yellow card) 63' (yellow-red card) 90+13'; Salah 73'	Stadium: Goodison Park; Attendance: 39,280; Referee: Michael Oliver
Note: Fixture was initially scheduled for a 15:00 kick-off on 7 December, but was moved to 12:30 for live TNT Sports broadcast, and later postponed due to severe weather caused by Storm Darragh.

16 February 2025 25	Liverpool	2–1	Wolverhampton Wanderers	Liverpool
14:00 GMT	Díaz 15'; Konaté (yellow card) 31'; Salah 37' (pen.); Van Dijk (yellow card) 71'	Report	Doherty (yellow card) 26'; Agbadou (yellow card) 39'; Cunha 67'	Stadium: Anfield; Attendance: 60,401; Referee: Simon Hooper
Note: Fixture was initially scheduled for 15 February, but was moved for live Sky Sports broadcast.

19 February 2025 29	Aston Villa	2–2	Liverpool	Birmingham
19:30 GMT	Disasi (yellow card) 23'; Tielemans 38'; Watkins 45+3'	Report	Salah 29'; Alexander-Arnold 61'	Stadium: Villa Park; Attendance: 41,910; Referee: Craig Pawson
Note: Fixture was initially scheduled for a 15:00 kick-off on 15 March, but was moved to 12:30 for live TNT Sports broadcast, and later moved forward due to Liverpool's participation in the EFL Cup final.

23 February 2025 26	Manchester City	0–2	Liverpool	Manchester
16:30 GMT		Report	Salah 14'; Szoboszlai 37'	Stadium: City of Manchester Stadium; Attendance: 52,803; Referee: Anthony Taylor
Note: Fixture was initially scheduled for 22 February, but was moved for live Sky Sports broadcast.

26 February 2025 27	Liverpool	2–0	Newcastle United	Liverpool
20:15 GMT	Szoboszlai 11'; Mac Allister 63'	Report	Murphy (yellow card) 80'	Stadium: Anfield; Attendance: 60,374; Referee: Stuart Attwell
Note: Fixture was initially scheduled for a 20:00 kick-off, but was moved for live TNT Sports broadcast.

8 March 2025 28	Liverpool	3–1	Southampton	Liverpool
15:00 GMT	Tsimikas (yellow card) 31'; Núñez (yellow card) 45+3', (goal) 51'; Salah 55' (pen.), 88' (pen.)	Report	Smallbone 45+1'; Onuachu (yellow card) 90+6'	Stadium: Anfield; Attendance: 60,399; Referee: Lewis Smith

2 April 2025 30	Liverpool	1–0	Everton	Liverpool
20:00 BST	Jota 57', (yellow card) 64'; Núñez (yellow card) 88'	Report	Tarkowski (yellow card) 11'; Beto (yellow card) 29'	Stadium: Anfield; Attendance: 60,331; Referee: Sam Barrott

6 April 2025 31	Fulham	3–2	Liverpool	Fulham
14:00 BST	Sessegnon 23'; Iwobi 32'; Muniz 37'; Lukić (yellow card) 46'; Smith Rowe (yellow card) 86'; Leno (yellow card) 90+5'	Report	Mac Allister 14'; Díaz 72'	Stadium: Craven Cottage; Attendance: 27,770; Referee: Chris Kavanagh
Note: Fixture was initially scheduled for 5 April, but was moved for live Sky Sports broadcast.

13 April 2025 32	Liverpool	2–1	West Ham United	Liverpool
14:00 BST	Díaz 18'; Van Dijk 89'	Report	Robertson 86' (o.g.); Coufal (yellow card) 90+6'; Paquetá (yellow card) 90+8'	Stadium: Anfield; Attendance: 60,376; Referee: Andy Madley
Note: Fixture was initially scheduled for 12 April, but was moved for live Sky Sports broadcast.

20 April 2025 33	Leicester City	0–1	Liverpool	Leicester
16:30 BST	Ndidi (yellow card) 70'	Report	Bradley (yellow card) 65'; Alexander-Arnold 76', (yellow card) 77'	Stadium: King Power Stadium; Attendance: 30,402; Referee: Stuart Attwell
Note: Fixture was initially scheduled for 19 April, but was moved for live Sky Sports broadcast.

27 April 2025 34	Liverpool	5–1	Tottenham Hotspur	Liverpool
16:30 BST	Díaz 16'; Mac Allister 24'; Gakpo 34', (yellow card) 34'; Salah 63'; Udogie 69' (o.g.); Elliott (yellow card) 90+4'	Report	Solanke 12'; Richarlison (yellow card) 90+4'	Stadium: Anfield; Attendance: 60,415; Referee: Thomas Bramall
Note: Fixture was initially scheduled for 26 April, but was moved for live Sky Sports broadcast.

4 May 2025 35	Chelsea	3–1	Liverpool	Fulham
16:30 BST	Fernández 3'; Chalobah (yellow card) 54'; Quansah 56' (o.g.); Sancho (yellow card) 84'; Palmer 90+6' (pen.)	Report	Van Dijk (yellow card) 51', (goal) 85'; Quansah (yellow card) 58'	Stadium: Stamford Bridge; Attendance: 39,829; Referee: Simon Hooper
Note: Fixture was initially scheduled for 3 May, but was moved for live Sky Sports broadcast.

11 May 2025 36	Liverpool	2–2	Arsenal	Liverpool
16:30 BST	Gakpo 20'; Díaz 21'; Bradley (yellow card) 60'	Report	Merino (yellow card) 34' (yellow-red card) 79', (goal) 70'; Lewis-Skelly (yellow card) 43'; Martinelli 47'	Stadium: Anfield; Attendance: 60,324; Referee: Anthony Taylor
Note: Fixture was initially scheduled for 10 May, but was moved for live Sky Sports broadcast.

19 May 2025 37	Brighton & Hove Albion	3–2	Liverpool	Brighton and Hove
20:00 BST	Ayari 32'; Mitoma 69'; Webster (yellow card) 77'; Hinshelwood 85'	Report	Elliott 9'; Szoboszlai 45+1'	Stadium: Falmer Stadium; Attendance: 31,611; Referee: Andy Madley
Note: Fixture was initially scheduled for 18 May, but was moved for live Sky Sports broadcast.

25 May 2025 38	Liverpool	1–1	Crystal Palace	Liverpool
16:00 BST	Gravenberch (yellow card) 61' (red card) 68'; Salah 84'; Van Dijk (yellow card) 90+5'	Report	Sarr 9'	Stadium: Anfield; Attendance: 60,382; Referee: Darren England

=== FA Cup ===
As a Premier League side, Liverpool entered the FA Cup in the third round, and were drawn at home to League Two side Accrington Stanley, where Rio Ngumoha made his senior debut and became the youngest Liverpool player ever to feature in the competition at 16 years and 135 days. In the fourth round, they were drawn away to Championship side Plymouth Argyle.

Win Draw Loss Fixtures

11 January 2025 Third round	Liverpool	4–0	Accrington Stanley	Liverpool
12:15 GMT	Jota 29'; Alexander-Arnold 45'; Danns 76'; Chiesa 90'	Report	Henderson (yellow card) 58'	Stadium: Anfield; Attendance: 60,261; Referee: Lewis Smith

9 February 2025 Fourth round	Plymouth Argyle	1–0	Liverpool	Plymouth
15:00 GMT	Hardie 53' (pen.); Bundu (yellow card) 70'; Sorinola (yellow card) 79'; Hazard (yellow card) 90'; Talovierov (yellow card) 90+8'	Report	Nyoni (yellow card) 18'; Mabaya (yellow card) 43'	Stadium: Home Park; Attendance: 16,724; Referee: Sam Barrott

=== EFL Cup ===
As one of the Premier League clubs participating in European competitions, Liverpool entered the EFL Cup in the third round, and were drawn at home against Premier League side West Ham United. They were then drawn away to Brighton & Hove Albion in the fourth round, and away to Southampton in the quarter-finals. In the semi-finals, Liverpool were drawn against Tottenham Hotspur, first leg away then second leg at home.

Win Draw Loss Fixtures

25 September 2024 Third round	Liverpool	5–1	West Ham United	Liverpool
20:00 BST	Jota 25', 49'; Quansah (yellow card) 63'; Salah 74'; Gakpo 90', 90+3'	Report	Quansah 21' (o.g.); Álvarez (yellow card) 67' (yellow-red card) 76'; Paquetá (yellow card) 70'	Stadium: Anfield; Attendance: 60,044; Referee: Andy Madley

30 October 2024 Fourth round	Brighton & Hove Albion	2–3	Liverpool	Brighton and Hove
19:30 GMT	Adingra 81'; Lamptey 90'	Report	Gakpo 46', 63'; Endo (yellow card) 51'; Díaz 85'; Konaté (yellow card) 90+2'	Stadium: Falmer Stadium; Attendance: 28,441; Referee: Darren Bond

18 December 2024 Quarter-finals	Southampton	1–2	Liverpool	Southampton
20:00 GMT	Downes (yellow card) 57'; Archer 59'; Brereton Díaz (yellow card) 90+4'	Report	Núñez 23'; Elliott 32', (yellow card) 57'; McConnell (yellow card) 90'	Stadium: St Mary's Stadium; Attendance: 26,503; Referee: Simon Hooper

8 January 2025 Semi-finals First leg	Tottenham Hotspur	1–0	Liverpool	Tottenham
20:00 GMT	Bissouma (yellow card) 32'; Bergvall (yellow card) 68', (goal) 86'	Report		Stadium: Tottenham Hotspur Stadium; Attendance: 59,037; Referee: Stuart Attwell

6 February 2025 Semi-finals Second leg	Liverpool	4–0 (4–1 agg.)	Tottenham Hotspur	Liverpool
20:00 GMT	Gakpo 34'; Salah 51' (pen.); Szoboszlai 75'; Van Dijk 80'	Report		Stadium: Anfield; Attendance: 60,395; Referee: Craig Pawson

16 March 2025 Final	Liverpool	1–2	Newcastle United	Wembley
16:30 GMT	Chiesa 90+4', (yellow card) 90+8'	Report	Burn 45'; Isak 52'; Pope (yellow card) 90'; Tonali (yellow card) 90+9'	Stadium: Wembley Stadium; Attendance: 88,513; Referee: John Brooks

=== UEFA Champions League ===
As the third-placed team in the Premier League, Liverpool entered the UEFA Champions League in the league phase.

==== League phase ====
The league phase draw was held on 29 August 2024. Liverpool were drawn at home to Real Madrid, Bayer Leverkusen, Lille, Bologna, and away to RB Leipzig, Milan, PSV Eindhoven and Girona.

On 10 December 2024, Liverpool recorded their 150th win in European Cup history following a 1–0 win over Girona in the league phase.

Pos	Team	Pld	W	D	L	GF	GA	GD	Pts	Qualification
1	(The Football Association) Liverpool	8	7	0	1	17	5	+12	21	Advance to round of 16 (seeded)
2	(Royal Spanish Football Federation) Barcelona	8	6	1	1	28	13	+15	19	Advance to round of 16 (seeded)
3	(The Football Association) Arsenal	8	6	1	1	16	3	+13	19	Advance to round of 16 (seeded)
4	(Italian Football Federation) Inter Milan	8	6	1	1	11	1	+10	19	Advance to round of 16 (seeded)
5	(Royal Spanish Football Federation) Atlético Madrid	8	6	0	2	20	12	+8	18	Advance to round of 16 (seeded)

Source: UEFA
Rules for classification: League phase tiebreakers

Round	1	2	3	4	5	6	7	8
Ground	A	H	A	H	H	A	H	A
Result	W	W	W	W	W	W	W	L
Position	7	5	2	1	1	1	1	1
Points	3	6	9	12	15	18	21	21

Source: UEFA
A = Away; H = Home; W = Win; D = Draw; L = Loss

Win Draw Loss Fixtures

17 September 2024 1	Milan (Italy)	1–3	(England) Liverpool	Milan, Italy
21:00 CEST	Pulisic 3'; Calabria (yellow card) 22'; Fofana (yellow card) 31'	Report	Konaté 23', (yellow card) 80'; Van Dijk 41'; Mac Allister (yellow card) 53'; Szoboszlai 67'	Stadium: San Siro; Attendance: 59,826; Referee: Espen Eskås (Norway)

2 October 2024 2	Liverpool (England)	2–0	(Italy) Bologna	Liverpool, England
20:00 BST	Mac Allister 11'; Van Dijk (yellow card) 26'; Konaté (yellow card) 39'; Robertson (yellow card) 55'; Salah 75'; Tsimikas (yellow card) 90'	Report	Beukema (yellow card) 39'; Aebischer (yellow card) 67'	Stadium: Anfield; Attendance: 59,816; Referee: Nikola Dabanović (Montenegro)

23 October 2024 3	RB Leipzig (Germany)	0–1	(England) Liverpool	Leipzig, Germany
21:00 CEST	Lukeba (yellow card) 8'; Geertruida (yellow card) 23'	Report	Mac Allister (yellow card) 12'; Núñez 27'	Stadium: Red Bull Arena; Attendance: 45,228; Referee: Sandro Schärer (Switzerland)

5 November 2024 4	Liverpool (England)	4–0	(Germany) Bayer Leverkusen	Liverpool, England
20:00 GMT	Díaz 61', 83', 90+2'; Gakpo 63'	Report	García (yellow card) 26'; Hradecky (yellow card) 60'	Stadium: Anfield; Attendance: 59,790; Referee: Danny Makkelie (Netherlands)

27 November 2024 5	Liverpool (England)	2–0	(Spain) Real Madrid	Liverpool, England
20:00 GMT	Núñez (yellow card) 13'; Gravenberch (yellow card) 18'; Mac Allister (yellow card) 40', (goal) 52'; Salah (penalty missed) 70'; Gakpo 77'	Report	Asencio (yellow card) 13'; Mbappé (penalty missed) 61'; Mendy (yellow card) 70'; Ceballos (yellow card) 80'; Endrick (yellow card) 90'	Stadium: Anfield; Attendance: 59,546; Referee: François Letexier (France)

10 December 2024 6	Girona (Spain)	0–1	(England) Liverpool	Girona, Spain
18:45 CET	Romeu (yellow card) 55'; Francés (yellow card) 87'; Portu (yellow card) 90+3'	Report	Díaz (yellow card) 53'; Salah 63' (pen.); Gomez (yellow card) 79'	Stadium: Estadi Montilivi; Attendance: 9,241; Referee: Benoît Bastien (France)

21 January 2025 7	Liverpool (England)	2–1	(France) Lille	Liverpool, England
20:00 GMT	Salah 34'; Elliott 67', (yellow card) 90+4'; Mac Allister (yellow card) 90+2'	Report	Mandi (yellow card) 35' (yellow-red card) 59'; David 62'; André (yellow card) 88'	Stadium: Anfield; Attendance: 59,782; Referee: Felix Zwayer (Germany)

29 January 2025 8	PSV Eindhoven (Netherlands)	3–2	(England) Liverpool	Eindhoven, Netherlands
21:00 CET	Bakayoko 35'; Saibari 45'; Karsdorp (yellow card) 45+3'; Veerman (yellow card) 45+3'; Pepi 45+6'	Report	Gakpo 28' (pen.); Elliott 40', (yellow card) 66'; Robertson (yellow card) 45+5'; Morton (yellow card) 63'; Nallo (red card) 87'	Stadium: Philips Stadion; Attendance: 35,000; Referee: Tobias Stieler (Germany)

==== Knockout phase ====
As the first-placed team in the league phase, Liverpool entered the knockout phase directly into the round of 16.

===== Round of 16 =====
The round of 16 draw was held on 21 February 2025. Liverpool were drawn against French champions and eventual winners Paris Saint-Germain, first leg away then second leg at home.

5 March 2025 First leg	Paris Saint-Germain (France)	0–1	(England) Liverpool	Paris, France
21:00 CET	Marquinhos (yellow card) 38'	Report	Van Dijk (yellow card) 70'; Elliott 87'	Stadium: Parc des Princes; Attendance: 47,511; Referee: Davide Massa (Italy)

11 March 2025 Second leg	Liverpool (England)	0–1 (a.e.t.) (1–1 agg.) (1–4 p)	(France) Paris Saint-Germain	Liverpool, England
20:00 GMT	Mac Allister (yellow card) 90+2'	Report	Dembélé 12'; Marquinhos (yellow card) 46'	Stadium: Anfield; Attendance: 59,765; Referee: István Kovács (Romania)
	Penalties
	Salah (penalty scored); Núñez (penalty missed); Jones (penalty missed)		(penalty scored) Vitinha; (penalty scored) Ramos; (penalty scored) Dembélé; (penalty scored) Doué

== Statistics ==
=== Appearances ===
Players with no appearances are not included on the list.

No.	Pos	Nat	Player	Total		Premier League		FA Cup		EFL Cup		Champions League	
No.	Pos	Nat	Player	Apps	Goals	Apps	Goals	Apps	Goals	Apps	Goals	Apps	Goals
1	GK	(Brazil) BRA	Alisson Becker	35	0	28+0	0	0+0	0	1+0	0	6+0	0
2	DF	(England) ENG	Joe Gomez	17	0	6+3	0	1+0	0	3+0	0	1+3	0
3	MF	(Japan) JPN	Wataru Endo	32	0	1+19	0	2+0	0	3+1	0	1+5	0
4	DF	(Netherlands) NED	Virgil van Dijk	49	5	37+0	3	0+0	0	3+0	1	9+0	1
5	DF	(France) FRA	Ibrahima Konaté	42	2	30+1	1	0+0	0	2+2	0	7+0	1
7	FW	(Colombia) COL	Luis Díaz	50	17	28+8	13	1+0	0	2+2	1	7+2	3
8	MF	(Hungary) HUN	Dominik Szoboszlai	49	8	29+7	6	1+0	0	3+0	1	7+2	1
9	FW	(Uruguay) URU	Darwin Núñez	47	7	8+22	5	1+1	0	3+3	1	5+4	1
10	MF	(Argentina) ARG	Alexis Mac Allister	49	7	30+5	5	0+0	0	3+3	0	7+1	2
11	FW	(Egypt) EGY	Mohamed Salah	52	34	38+0	29	0+0	0	3+2	2	9+0	3
14	FW	(Italy) ITA	Federico Chiesa	14	2	1+5	0	1+1	1	1+2	1	1+2	0
17	MF	(England) ENG	Curtis Jones	46	3	19+14	3	0+0	0	4+1	0	4+4	0
18	FW	(Netherlands) NED	Cody Gakpo	49	18	23+12	10	0+0	0	5+1	5	4+4	3
19	MF	(England) ENG	Harvey Elliott	28	5	2+16	1	2+0	0	1+2	1	1+4	3
20	FW	(Portugal) POR	Diogo Jota	37	9	14+12	6	2+0	1	3+2	2	3+1	0
21	DF	(Greece) GRE	Kostas Tsimikas	29	0	9+9	0	2+0	0	2+1	0	5+1	0
26	DF	(Scotland) SCO	Andy Robertson	45	0	29+4	0	0+0	0	3+1	0	6+2	0
38	MF	(Netherlands) NED	Ryan Gravenberch	49	0	37+0	0	0+0	0	3+0	0	9+0	0
51	FW	(Republic of Ireland) IRL	Trent Koné-Doherty	1	0	0+0	0	0+1	0	0+0	0	0+0	0
52	DF	(Zimbabwe) ZIM	Isaac Mabaya	1	0	0+0	0	0+1	0	0+0	0	0+0	0
53	MF	(England) ENG	James McConnell	4	0	0+0	0	1+1	0	0+1	0	1+0	0
56	GK	(Czech Republic) CZE	Vítězslav Jaroš	2	0	0+1	0	0+0	0	1+0	0	0+0	0
62	GK	(Republic of Ireland) IRL	Caoimhín Kelleher	20	0	10+0	0	2+0	0	4+0	0	4+0	0
65	DF	(England) ENG	Amara Nallo	1	0	0+0	0	0+0	0	0+0	0	0+1	0
66	DF	(England) ENG	Trent Alexander-Arnold	44	4	28+5	3	1+0	1	1+1	0	7+1	0
73	FW	(England) ENG	Rio Ngumoha	1	0	0+0	0	1+0	0	0+0	0	0+0	0
76	FW	(England) ENG	Jayden Danns	4	1	0+1	0	0+1	1	0+1	0	1+0	0
78	DF	(England) ENG	Jarell Quansah	25	0	4+9	0	2+0	0	5+1	0	2+2	0
80	MF	(England) ENG	Tyler Morton	5	0	0+0	0	1+0	0	2+1	0	0+1	0
84	DF	(Northern Ireland) NIR	Conor Bradley	29	0	7+12	0	0+1	0	4+0	0	3+2	0
98	MF	(England) ENG	Trey Nyoni	5	0	0+0	0	1+1	0	1+1	0	0+1	0

=== Goals ===
Rank	Pos.	No.	Player	Premier League	FA Cup	EFL Cup	Champions League	Total
1	FW	11	(Egypt) Mohamed Salah	29	0	2	3	34
2	FW	18	(Netherlands) Cody Gakpo	10	0	5	3	18
3	FW	7	(Colombia) Luis Díaz	13	0	1	3	17
4	FW	20	(Portugal) Diogo Jota	6	1	2	0	9
5	MF	8	(Hungary) Dominik Szoboszlai	6	0	1	1	8
6	FW	9	(Uruguay) Darwin Núñez	5	0	1	1	7
6	MF	10	(Argentina) Alexis Mac Allister	5	0	0	2	7
8	DF	4	(Netherlands) Virgil van Dijk	3	0	1	1	5
8	MF	19	(England) Harvey Elliott	1	0	1	3	5
10	DF	66	(England) Trent Alexander-Arnold	3	1	0	0	4
11	MF	17	(England) Curtis Jones	3	0	0	0	3
12	DF	5	(France) Ibrahima Konaté	1	0	0	1	2
12	FW	14	(Italy) Federico Chiesa	0	1	1	0	2
14	FW	76	(England) Jayden Danns	0	1	0	0	1
Own goals				1	0	0	0	1
Total				86	4	15	18	123

=== Clean sheets ===
Rank	No.	Player	Premier League	FA Cup	EFL Cup	Champions League	Total
1	1	(Brazil) Alisson Becker	9	0	0	3	12
2	62	(Republic of Ireland) Caoimhín Kelleher	4	1	1	3	9
Total			13	1	1	6	21

=== Disciplinary record ===
No.	Pos.	Player	Premier League			FA Cup			EFL Cup			Champions League			Total		
No.	Pos.	Player	Yellow card	(yellow card) (yellow-red card)	Red card	Yellow card	(yellow card) (yellow-red card)	Red card	Yellow card	(yellow card) (yellow-red card)	Red card	Yellow card	(yellow card) (yellow-red card)	Red card	Yellow card	(yellow card) (yellow-red card)	Red card
2	DF	(England) Joe Gomez	1	0	0	0	0	0	0	0	0	1	0	0	2	0	0
3	MF	(Japan) Wataru Endo	0	0	0	0	0	0	1	0	0	0	0	0	1	0	0
4	DF	(Netherlands) Virgil van Dijk	5	0	0	0	0	0	0	0	0	2	0	0	7	0	0
5	DF	(France) Ibrahima Konaté	5	0	0	0	0	0	1	0	0	2	0	0	8	0	0
7	FW	(Colombia) Luis Díaz	2	0	0	0	0	0	0	0	0	1	0	0	3	0	0
8	MF	(Hungary) Dominik Szoboszlai	6	0	0	0	0	0	0	0	0	0	0	0	6	0	0
9	FW	(Uruguay) Darwin Núñez	8	0	0	0	0	0	0	0	0	1	0	0	9	0	0
10	MF	(Argentina) Alexis Mac Allister	6	0	0	0	0	0	0	0	0	5	0	0	11	0	0
11	FW	(Egypt) Mohamed Salah	1	0	0	0	0	0	0	0	0	0	0	0	1	0	0
14	FW	(Italy) Federico Chiesa	0	0	0	0	0	0	1	0	0	0	0	0	1	0	0
17	MF	(England) Curtis Jones	1	1	0	0	0	0	0	0	0	0	0	0	1	1	0
18	FW	(Netherlands) Cody Gakpo	5	0	0	0	0	0	0	0	0	0	0	0	5	0	0
19	MF	(England) Harvey Elliott	1	0	0	0	0	0	1	0	0	2	0	0	4	0	0
20	FW	(Portugal) Diogo Jota	2	0	0	0	0	0	0	0	0	0	0	0	2	0	0
21	DF	(Greece) Kostas Tsimikas	2	0	0	0	0	0	0	0	0	1	0	0	3	0	0
26	DF	(Scotland) Andy Robertson	3	0	1	0	0	0	0	0	0	2	0	0	5	0	1
38	MF	(Netherlands) Ryan Gravenberch	6	0	1	0	0	0	0	0	0	1	0	0	7	0	1
52	DF	(Zimbabwe) Isaac Mabaya	0	0	0	1	0	0	0	0	0	0	0	0	1	0	0
53	MF	(England) James McConnell	0	0	0	0	0	0	1	0	0	0	0	0	1	0	0
65	DF	(England) Amara Nallo	0	0	0	0	0	0	0	0	0	0	0	1	0	0	1
66	DF	(England) Trent Alexander-Arnold	5	0	0	0	0	0	0	0	0	0	0	0	5	0	0
78	DF	(England) Jarell Quansah	2	0	0	0	0	0	1	0	0	0	0	0	3	0	0
80	MF	(England) Tyler Morton	0	0	0	0	0	0	0	0	0	1	0	0	1	0	0
84	DF	(Northern Ireland) Conor Bradley	4	0	0	0	0	0	0	0	0	0	0	0	4	0	0
98	MF	(England) Trey Nyoni	0	0	0	1	0	0	0	0	0	0	0	0	1	0	0
Total			65	1	2	2	0	0	6	0	0	19	0	1	92	1	3

== Club awards ==
=== Player of the Month award ===
Awarded monthly to the player that was chosen by fans voting on liverpoolfc.com

Month	Player	Ref.
August	(Egypt) Mohamed Salah	
September	(Netherlands) Ryan Gravenberch	
October	(Egypt) Mohamed Salah	
November	(Egypt) Mohamed Salah	
December	(Egypt) Mohamed Salah	
January	(Netherlands) Cody Gakpo	
February	(Hungary) Dominik Szoboszlai	
March	(Brazil) Alisson Becker	
April	(Argentina) Alexis Mac Allister	

=== Player of the Season award ===
Mohamed Salah won the Player of the Season award for the fifth time, his fourth in the last five seasons which equals Steven Gerrard's record.

== Parade incident ==
During the club's Premier League victory parade on 26 May 2025, a man drove into a large crowd on Water Street; 79 people were injured, 50 of whom were hospitalised. Merseyside Police arrested a 53-year-old man on the scene.
