= Isaac Mabaya =

Zimbabwe international footballer (born 2004)

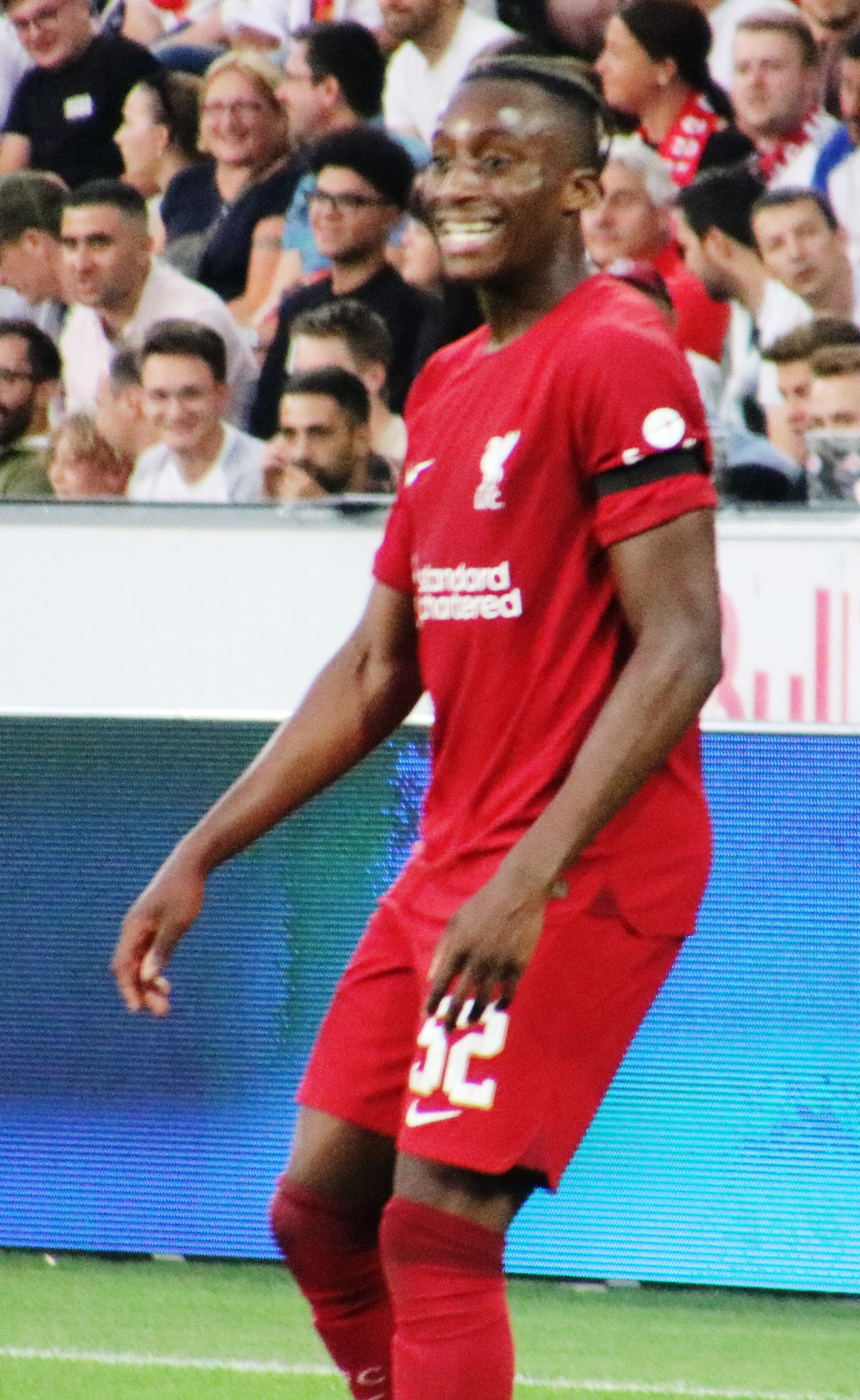
- Mabaya playing for Liverpool 2022

Personal information
- Full name: Isaac Angus Mabaya
- Date of birth: 22 September 2004 (age 22)
- Place of birth: Preston, Lancashire, England
- Height: 6 ft 1 in (1.86 m)
- Position: Right-back

Team information
- Current team: Liverpool
- Number: 52

Youth career
- –2024: Liverpool

Senior career*
Years	Team	Apps	(Gls)
2024–	Liverpool	0	(0)
2025–2026	→ Wigan Athletic (loan)	2	(0)

International career^{‡}
2019	England U15	1	(0)
2019	England U16	5	(0)
2022	England U18	1	(1)
2022	England U19	2	(0)
- * Club domestic league appearances and goals as of 23:51, 25 August 2025 (UTC) ‡ National team caps and goals as of 00:15, 5 November 2023 (UTC)

Isaac Angus Mabaya (born 22 September 2004) is a professional footballer who plays as a right-back for Premier League club Liverpool. Born in England, he plays for the Zimbabwe national team.

== Early life ==
Mabaya was born in Preston, Lancashire to Zimbabwean parents, David Mabaya and Rosina Mugabe. He joined Liverpool aged six years-old.

== Club career ==
Mabaya progressed through the academy system at Liverpool. He initially played as a midfielder but transitioned to right-back during the 2020–21 season. He signed his first professional contract with the club in September 2021. In January 2022, he made the Liverpool first-team match day squad for the first time when he was an unused substitute in the FA Cup against Shrewsbury Town.

Mabaya impressed enough during the 2021–22 season, playing at right-back for the Liverpool under-18 side, that he was chosen to tour the Far East with the Liverpool first-team squad during the summer of 2022. He had game time on the tour, and featured against Manchester United in Bangkok.

Mabaya's 2022–23 season was curtailed by a season-ending ankle injury in October 2022. He signed a new professional contract with Liverpool in May 2023.

He was included in the Liverpool first-team squad for the UEFA Champions League tie against PSV Eindhoven on 29 January 2025 and was named amongst the match-day substitutes.

On 9 February 2025, he made his competitive debut in the fourth round of the FA Cup away to Plymouth Argyle, coming on in the 11th minute for injured captain Joe Gomez.

In August 2025, he joined Wigan Athletic on a season-long loan.

== International career ==
An England youth international, he was called up to the England U18 side for the first time in March 2022. He scored on his debut, against Sweden U18.

Mabaya later received his first call-up to the England U19 side in September 2022. He made his debut that month in a 6–0 home win against Georgia, providing an assist for Liverpool teammate Oakley Cannonier.

In November 2023, Mabaya was called-up by Baltemar Brito to the senior Zimbabwe national football team for FIFA 2026 World Cup qualifying matches against Rwanda and Nigeria. However, he did not feature in the finalised squad for the matches.

== Career statistics ==
As of match played 12 August 2025

Appearances and goals by club, season and competition
Club	Season	League			FA Cup		EFL Cup		Europe		Other		Total	
Club	Season	Division	Apps	Goals	Apps	Goals	Apps	Goals	Apps	Goals	Apps	Goals	Apps	Goals
Liverpool U21	2021–22	—			—		—		—		1 (Note: Appearance(s) in EFL Trophy)	0	1	0
Liverpool U21	2022–23	—			—		—		—		1	0	1	0
Liverpool U21	Total		—		—		—		—		2	0	2	0
Liverpool	2024–25	Premier League	0	0	1	0	0	0	0	0	0	0	1	0
Wigan Athletic (loan)	2025–26	League One	2	0	0	0	1	0	—		0	0	3	0
Career total			2	0	1	0	1	0	0	0	2	0	6	0
