= 2019–20 Liverpool F.C. season =

English football club season

Liverpool
2019–20 season
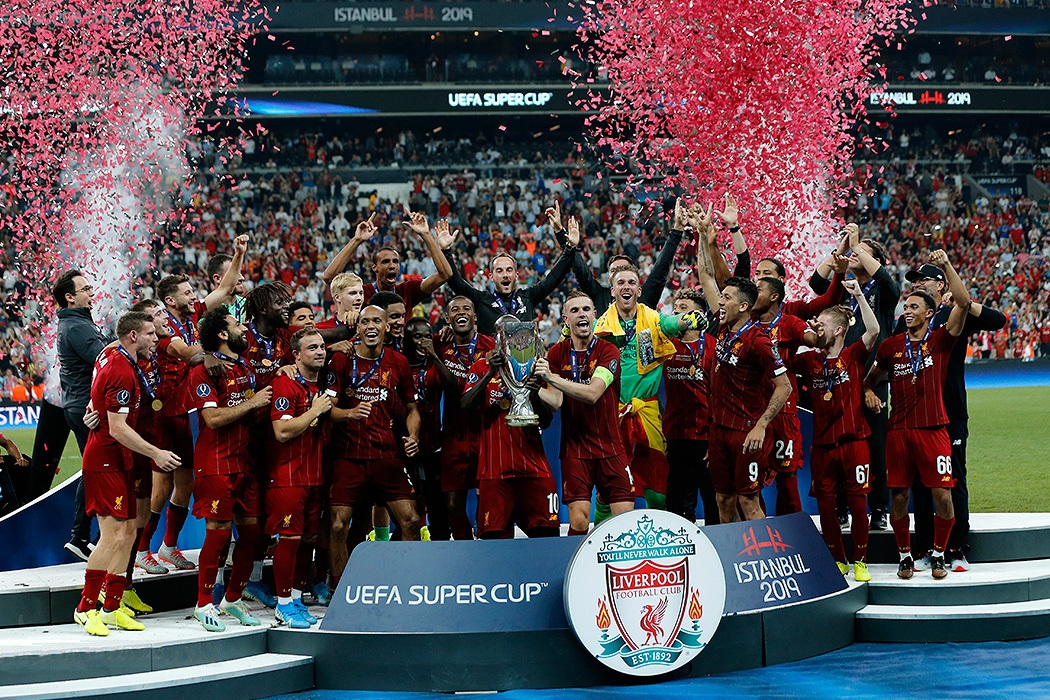
- Sadio Mané and Jordan Henderson lifting the UEFA Super Cup after Liverpool beat Chelsea on penalties
- Owner: Fenway Sports Group
- Chairman: Tom Werner
- Manager: Jürgen Klopp
- Stadium: Anfield
- Premier League: 1st
- FA Cup: Fifth round
- EFL Cup: Quarter-finals
- UEFA Champions League: Round of 16
- FA Community Shield: Runners-up
- UEFA Super Cup: Winners
- FIFA Club World Cup: Winners
- Top goalscorer: League: Mohamed Salah (19); All: Mohamed Salah (23)
Home colours	Away colours	Third colours

The 2019–20 season was Liverpool Football Club's 128th season in existence and the club's 58th consecutive season in the top flight of English football. Liverpool also competed in the FA Cup, EFL Cup, FA Community Shield, UEFA Champions League, UEFA Super Cup and the FIFA Club World Cup. The season was suspended from 13 March to 17 June due to the COVID-19 pandemic.

== Season overview ==
Having finished second in the 2018–19 Premier League, Liverpool contested the 2019 FA Community Shield against domestic treble winners Manchester City, losing 5–4 on penalties after a 1–1 draw. As winners of the 2018–19 UEFA Champions League, they contested the 2019 UEFA Super Cup against Chelsea, winning 5–4 on penalties after a 2–2 draw. The victory was Liverpool's fourth in the annual contest; only Real Madrid, Barcelona and AC Milan have more wins, with five titles apiece.

Liverpool were eliminated in the quarter-finals of the 2019–20 EFL Cup by Aston Villa after fielding a vastly inexperienced side, managed by Liverpool under-23 manager Neil Critchley, while the first-team squad participated in the 2019 FIFA Club World Cup in Qatar under Klopp. Having finished as runners-up on three previous occasions, Liverpool won their first world title after defeating Brazilian club Flamengo 1–0 in the final after extra time, making them the first English side to win the international treble of the UEFA Champions League, UEFA Super Cup and FIFA Club World Cup. Liverpool were unsuccessful in their defence of the UEFA Champions League, exiting the competition in the round of 16 following a 4–2 aggregate defeat across two legs after extra time to Atlético Madrid.

On 25 June, following Manchester City's defeat to Chelsea, Liverpool clinched their nineteenth league title – the first since 1989–90 and the first during the Premier League era. Upon winning the league, Liverpool claimed the unusual achievement of winning the Premier League earlier than any other team by games played (with seven remaining) and later than any other team by date (being the only team to clinch the title in June).

Over the season, Liverpool set a number of other English top-flight records, including the most consecutive home wins (24; of which 7 were carried over from the previous season) and the biggest point lead at any time (25). They also matched the Premier League records for the most wins (32) the most home wins (18), and the most consecutive wins (18). Beginning the season prior, Liverpool enjoyed a 44-match unbeaten run in the league, the second-longest streak in top-flight history, behind Arsenal's run of 49 games between May 2003 to October 2004. The team remained unbeaten at home in the league for the third season in a row and finished the season with 99 points, the club's record and the second highest in English top-flight history after Manchester City's 100 two years prior. Liverpool also recorded the best ever start to a season in the history of the top 5 leagues in Europe (as they stood in 2020), picking up 20 wins and 1 draw for a total of 61 points out of a possible of 63; they eventually extended that record to 26 wins and 1 draw for a total of 79 points out of a possible 81 before suffering their first league defeat on 29 February 2020 to Watford.

== First-team squad ==
Squad no.	Player	Nationality	Position(s)	Date of birth (age)	Signed from	Apps	Goals	Assists
Goalkeepers
1	Alisson Becker	(Brazil)	GK	2 October 1992 (aged 27)	(Italy) Roma	88	1	1
13	Adrián	(Spain)	GK	3 January 1987 (aged 33)	(England) West Ham United	18	0	0
22	Andy Lonergan	(England)	GK	19 October 1983 (aged 36)	(England) Middlesbrough	0	0	0
62	Caoimhín Kelleher	(Republic of Ireland)	GK	23 November 1998 (aged 21)	(England) LFC Academy	4	0	0
Defenders
2	Nathaniel Clyne	(England)	RB	5 April 1991 (aged 29)	(England) Southampton	103	2	4
4	Virgil van Dijk (3rd captain)	(Netherlands)	CB	8 July 1991 (aged 29)	(England) Southampton	122	12	6
6	Dejan Lovren	(Croatia)	CB	5 July 1989 (aged 31)	(England) Southampton	185	8	4
12	Joe Gomez	(England)	CB/RB/LB	23 May 1997 (aged 23)	(England) Charlton Athletic	109	0	3
26	Andy Robertson	(Scotland)	LB	11 March 1994 (aged 26)	(England) Hull City	127	4	30
32	Joël Matip	(Cameroon)	CB	8 August 1991 (aged 28)	(Germany) Schalke 04	111	5	1
51	Ki-Jana Hoever	(Netherlands)	CB/RB	18 January 2002 (aged 18)	(Netherlands) Ajax	4	1	0
66	Trent Alexander-Arnold	(England)	RB	7 October 1998 (aged 21)	(England) LFC Academy	134	8	34
72	Sepp van den Berg	(Netherlands)	CB/RB	20 December 2001 (aged 18)	(Netherlands) PEC Zwolle	4	0	0
76	Neco Williams	(Wales)	RB	13 April 2001 (aged 19)	(England) LFC Academy	11	0	1
Midfielders
3	Fabinho	(Brazil)	DM/RB/CB	23 October 1993 (aged 26)	(France) Monaco	80	3	6
5	Georginio Wijnaldum	(Netherlands)	CM/DM/AM	11 November 1990 (aged 29)	(England) Newcastle United	186	19	15
7	James Milner (vice-captain)	(England)	CM/LB/RB	4 January 1986 (aged 34)	(England) Manchester City	214	26	39
8	Naby Keïta	(Guinea)	CM/AM	10 February 1995 (aged 25)	(Germany) RB Leipzig	60	7	4
14	Jordan Henderson (captain)	(England)	CM/DM	17 June 1990 (aged 30)	(England) Sunderland	364	29	48
15	Alex Oxlade-Chamberlain	(England)	CM/AM/LW/RW	15 August 1993 (aged 26)	(England) Arsenal	87	13	10
20	Adam Lallana	(England)	CM/DM/AM	10 May 1988 (aged 32)	(England) Southampton	178	22	21
23	Xherdan Shaqiri	(Switzerland)	RW/LW/AM	10 October 1991 (aged 28)	(England) Stoke City	41	7	5
48	Curtis Jones	(England)	CM	30 January 2001 (aged 19)	(England) LFC Academy	13	3	1
67	Harvey Elliott	(England)	RW/LW	4 April 2003 (aged 17)	(England) Fulham	8	0	0
Forwards
9	Roberto Firmino	(Brazil)	ST/AM	2 October 1991 (aged 28)	(Germany) 1899 Hoffenheim	244	78	54
10	Sadio Mané	(Senegal)	LW/RW/ST	10 April 1992 (aged 28)	(England) Southampton	170	81	28
11	Mohamed Salah	(Egypt)	RW/ST	15 June 1992 (aged 28)	(Italy) Roma	152	94	37
18	Takumi Minamino	(Japan)	RW/LW/AM/ST	16 January 1995 (aged 25)	(Austria) Red Bull Salzburg	14	0	0
27	Divock Origi	(Belgium)	ST/LW	18 April 1995 (aged 25)	(France) Lille	140	34	9

=== New contracts ===
Date	Pos.	No.	Player	Ref.
10 July 2019	FW	27	(Belgium) Divock Origi	
15 July 2019	GK	73	(Poland) Kamil Grabara	
31 July 2019	DF	51	(Netherlands) Ki-Jana Hoever	
7 August 2019	DF	47	(England) Nat Phillips	
16 August 2019	MF	48	(England) Curtis Jones	
22 August 2019	MF	15	(England) Alex Oxlade-Chamberlain	
18 October 2019	DF	32	(Cameroon) Joël Matip	
13 December 2019	MF	7	(England) James Milner	
9 June 2020	MF	20	(England) Adam Lallana	
9 June 2020	GK	22	(England) Andy Lonergan	

Date	Coach	Ref.
13 December 2019	(Germany) Jürgen Klopp	

== Transfers and loans ==
=== Transfers in ===
Entry date	Position	No.	Player	From club	Fee	Ref.
1 July 2019	DF	72	(Netherlands) Sepp van den Berg	(Netherlands) PEC Zwolle	£1,300,000 (Note: Fee may eventually rise to £4,400,000.)	
28 July 2019	MF	67	(England) Harvey Elliott	(England) Fulham	£1,700,000 (Note: Fee may eventually rise to £4,300,000.)	
5 August 2019	GK	13	(Spain) Adrián	(England) West Ham United	Free	
12 August 2019	GK	22	(England) Andy Lonergan	(England) Middlesbrough	Free	
1 January 2020	FW	18	(Japan) Takumi Minamino	(Austria) Red Bull Salzburg	£7,250,000	
Total					£10,250,000	

=== Transfers out ===
Exit date	Position	No.	Player	To club	Fee	Ref.
1 July 2019	FW	15	(England) Daniel Sturridge	(Turkey) Trabzonspor	Released	
1 July 2019	DF	18	(Spain) Alberto Moreno	(Spain) Villarreal	Released	
1 July 2019	GK	34	(Hungary) Ádám Bogdán	(Scotland) Hibernian	Released	
1 July 2019	DF	56	(England) Connor Randall	(Bulgaria) Arda	Released	
1 July 2019	MF	64	(Portugal) Rafael Camacho	(Portugal) Sporting CP	£5,000,000 (Note: Fee may eventually rise to £7,000,000.)	
1 July 2019	FW	28	(England) Danny Ings	(England) Southampton	£18,000,000 (Note: Fee may eventually rise to £20,000,000.)	
5 August 2019	GK	22	(Belgium) Simon Mignolet	(Belgium) Club Brugge	£6,400,000 (Note: Fee may eventually rise to £8,200,000.)	
2 September 2019	MF	40	(England) Ryan Kent	(Scotland) Rangers	£6,500,000 (Note: Fee may eventually rise to £7,500,000.)	
9 January 2020	MF	—	(Brazil) Allan	(Brazil) Atlético Mineiro	£3,200,000	
1 July 2020	MF	68	(Spain) Pedro Chirivella	(France) Nantes	Released	
1 July 2020	DF	2	(England) Nathaniel Clyne	(England) Crystal Palace	Released	
Total					£39,100,000	

=== Loans out ===
Start date	End date	Position	No.	Player	To club	Fee	Ref.
25 August 2018	4 May 2020	GK	—	(Germany) Loris Karius	(Turkey) Beşiktaş	£2,250,000	
1 July 2019	31 December 2019	MF	—	(Brazil) Allan	(Brazil) Fluminense	None	
1 July 2019	30 June 2020	MF	16	(Serbia) Marko Grujić	(Germany) Hertha BSC	£2,000,000 (Note: Fee may eventually rise to £2,500,000.)	
1 July 2019	30 June 2020	MF	54	(England) Sheyi Ojo	(Scotland) Rangers	None	
15 July 2019	30 June 2020	GK	73	(Poland) Kamil Grabara	(England) Huddersfield Town	None	
30 July 2019	30 June 2020	MF	58	(Wales) Ben Woodburn	(England) Oxford United	None	
6 August 2019	30 June 2020	FW	—	(Nigeria) Taiwo Awoniyi	(Germany) Mainz 05	£600,000	
6 August 2019	31 July 2020	FW	59	(Wales) Harry Wilson	(England) Bournemouth	£2,500,000 (Note: Fee may eventually rise to £3,000,000.)	
7 August 2019	27 December 2019	DF	47	(England) Nat Phillips	(Germany) VfB Stuttgart	None	
8 August 2019	30 June 2020	MF	53	(England) Ovie Ejaria	(England) Reading	None	
7 January 2020	30 June 2020	FW	24	(England) Rhian Brewster	(Wales) Swansea City	None	
13 January 2020	30 June 2020	DF	47	(England) Nat Phillips	(Germany) VfB Stuttgart	None	
Total						£7,350,000	

=== Transfer summary ===
Spending

Summer: ▼£ 3,000,000

Winter: ▼£ 7,250,000

Total: ▼£ 10,250,000

Income

Summer: ▲£ 43,250,000

Winter: ▲£ 3,200,000

Total: ▲£ 46,450,000

Net Expenditure

Summer: ▲£ 40,250,000

Winter: ▼£ 4,050,000

Total: ▲£ 36,200,000

== Friendlies ==
=== Pre-season ===
In June 2019, Liverpool announced their pre-season schedule.

11 July 2019 Friendly	Tranmere Rovers	0–6	Liverpool	Birkenhead, England
19:30 BST		Report	Clyne 6'; Brewster 38', 45'; Jones 53'; Origi 60'; Duncan 67'	Stadium: Prenton Park; Referee: Mike Dean

14 July 2019 Friendly	Bradford City	1–3	Liverpool	Bradford, England
15:00 BST	Doyle 81' (pen.)	Report	Milner 13', 15' (pen.); Brewster 41'	Stadium: Valley Parade; Attendance: 24,343; Referee: Andy Madley

20 July 2019 Friendly	Liverpool	2–3	Borussia Dortmund	Notre Dame, United States
01:00 BST	Wilson 35'; Larouci (yellow card) 43'; Brewster 75' (pen.), (yellow card) 84'	Report	Alcácer 3'; Hummels (yellow card) 11'; Delaney 53'; Bruun Larsen 58'	Stadium: Notre Dame Stadium; Attendance: 40,361; Referee: Nima Saghafi (United States)

21 July 2019 Friendly	Liverpool	1–2	Sevilla	Boston, United States
23:00 BST	Woodburn (yellow card) 36'; Origi 44'	Report	Banega (yellow card) 12'; Diego Carlos (yellow card) 35'; Nolito 37'; Gnagnon (red card) 76'; Pozo 90'	Stadium: Fenway Park; Attendance: 35,654; Referee: Fotis Bazakos (United States)

25 July 2019 Western Union Cup	Liverpool	2–2	Sporting CP	New York City, United States
23:00 BST	Origi 20'; Wijnaldum 44'; Fabinho (yellow card) 88'	Report	Fernandes 4'; Neto (yellow card) 30'; Wendel 53'	Stadium: Yankee Stadium; Attendance: 31,112; Referee: Sorin Stoica (United States)

28 July 2019 Friendly	Liverpool	0–3	Napoli	Edinburgh, Scotland
17:30 BST		Report	Insigne 17'; Milik 28'; Younes 52'	Stadium: Murrayfield Stadium; Attendance: 65,442 (Note: Largest attendance at a football match in Scotland since the 1989 Scottish Cup Final.); Referee: Bobby Madden (Scotland)

31 July 2019 Friendly	Liverpool	3–1	Lyon	Geneva, Switzerland
18:00 BST	Alisson (yellow card) 3'; Firmino 17'; Andersen 21' (o.g.); Hoever (yellow card) 38'; Wilson 53'	Report	Depay 4' (pen.)	Stadium: Stade de Genève; Referee: Stephan Klossner (Switzerland)

=== Mid-season ===
11 June 2020 Friendly	Liverpool	6–0	Blackburn Rovers	Liverpool, England
	Mané 10'; Keïta 23'; Minamino 36'; Matip 67'; Hoever 69'; Clarkson 84'	Report		Stadium: Anfield; Attendance: 0

== Competitions ==
=== Overview ===
Competition	First match	Last match	Starting round	Final position	Record							
Competition	First match	Last match	Starting round	Final position	Pld	W	D	L	GF	GA	GD	Win %
Premier League	9 August 2019	26 July 2020	Matchday 1	Winners	38	32	3	3	85	33	+52	84.21
UEFA Super Cup	14 August 2019		Final	Winners	1	0	1	0	2	2	+0	0.00
FIFA Club World Cup	18 December 2019	21 December 2019	Semi-finals	Winners	2	2	0	0	2	1	+1	100.00
FA Community Shield	4 August 2019		Final	Runners-up	1	0	1	0	1	1	+0	0.00
EFL Cup	25 September 2019	17 December 2019	Third round	Quarter-finals	3	1	1	1	7	10	−3	33.33
UEFA Champions League	17 September 2019	11 March 2020	Group stage	Round of 16	8	4	1	3	15	12	+3	50.00
FA Cup	5 January 2020	3 March 2020	Third round	Fifth round	4	2	1	1	4	4	+0	50.00
Total					57	41	8	8	116	63	+53	71.93

Source: Competitions

=== FA Community Shield ===
4 August 2019	Liverpool	1–1 (4–5 p)	Manchester City	Wembley
15:00 BST	Matip 77'	Report	Sterling 12'; De Bruyne (yellow card) 33'	Stadium: Wembley Stadium; Attendance: 77,565; Referee: Martin Atkinson
	Penalties
	Shaqiri (penalty scored); Wijnaldum (penalty missed); Lallana (penalty scored); Oxlade-Chamberlain (penalty scored); Salah (penalty scored)		(penalty scored) Gündoğan; (penalty scored) B. Silva; (penalty scored) Foden; (penalty scored) Zinchenko; (penalty scored) Gabriel Jesus
Note: Manchester City manager Pep Guardiola was cautioned (yellow card) in the 42nd minute. Live on BT Sport

=== UEFA Super Cup ===
14 August 2019	Liverpool (England)	2–2 (a.e.t.) (5–4 p)	(England) Chelsea	Istanbul, Turkey
22:00 TRT	Mané 48', 95'; Henderson (yellow card) 85'; Alexander-Arnold (yellow card) 107'	Report	Giroud 36'; Azpilicueta (yellow card) 79'; Jorginho 101' (pen.)	Stadium: Vodafone Park; Attendance: 38,434; Referee: Stéphanie Frappart (France)
	Penalties
	Firmino (penalty scored); Fabinho (penalty scored); Origi (penalty scored); Alexander-Arnold (penalty scored); Salah (penalty scored)		(penalty scored) Jorginho; (penalty scored) Barkley; (penalty scored) Mount; (penalty scored) Emerson; (penalty missed) Abraham

=== FIFA Club World Cup ===
18 December 2019 Semi-finals	Monterrey (Mexico)	1–2	(England) Liverpool	Doha, Qatar
20:30 AST	Funes Mori 14'; Vangioni (yellow card) 47'; Gallardo (yellow card) 78'	Report	Keïta 12'; Gomez (yellow card) 58'; Firmino 90+1'	Stadium: Khalifa International Stadium; Attendance: 45,416; Referee: Roberto Tobar (Chile)
Note: Monterrey manager Antonio Mohamed was cautioned (yellow card) in the 77th minute for arguing with match officials. Liverpool manager Jürgen Klopp was also cautioned (yellow card) in the 77th minute for mocking Antonio Mohamed's protest.

21 December 2019 Final	Liverpool (England)	1–0 (a.e.t.)	(Brazil) Flamengo	Doha, Qatar
20:30 AST	Mané (yellow card) 45+1'; Salah (yellow card) 81'; Firmino 99', (yellow card) 100'; Milner (yellow card) 105'	Report	Vitinho (yellow card) 90'; Diego (yellow card) 112'	Stadium: Khalifa International Stadium; Attendance: 45,416; Referee: Abdulrahman Al-Jassim (Qatar)

=== Premier League ===
==== League table ====
Pos	Team	Pld	W	D	L	GF	GA	GD	Pts	Qualification or relegation
1	Liverpool (C)	38	32	3	3	85	33	+52	99	Qualification for the Champions League group stage
2	Manchester City	38	26	3	9	102	35	+67	81	Qualification for the Champions League group stage
3	Manchester United	38	18	12	8	66	36	+30	66	Qualification for the Champions League group stage
4	Chelsea	38	20	6	12	69	54	+15	66	Qualification for the Champions League group stage
5	Leicester City	38	18	8	12	67	41	+26	62	Qualification for the Europa League group stage

Source: Premier League
Rules for classification: 1) Points; 2) Goal difference; 3) Goals scored; 4) If the champions, relegated teams or qualified teams for UEFA competitions cannot be determined by rules 1 to 3, rules 4.1 to 4.3 are applied – 4.1) Points gained in head to head record between such teams; 4.2) Away goals scored in head to head record between such teams; 4.3) Play-offs
(C) Champions

==== Results summary ====
Overall								Home						Away					
Pld	W	D	L	GF	GA	GD	Pts	W	D	L	GF	GA	GD	W	D	L	GF	GA	GD
38	32	3	3	85	33	+52	99	18	1	0	52	16	+36	14	2	3	33	17	+16

Source: Premier League

==== Results by matchday ====
Matchday	1	2	3	4	5	6	7	8	9	10	11	12	13	14	15	16	17	19	20	21	22	23	24	18^{1}	25	26	27	28	29	30	31	32	33	34	35	36	37	38
Ground	H	A	H	A	H	A	A	H	A	H	A	H	A	H	H	A	H	A	H	H	A	H	A	A	H	A	H	A	H	A	H	A	H	A	H	A	H	A
Result	W	W	W	W	W	W	W	W	D	W	W	W	W	W	W	W	W	W	W	W	W	W	W	W	W	W	W	L	W	D	W	L	W	W	D	L	W	W
Position	3	1	1	1	1	1	1	1	1	1	1	1	1	1	1	1	1	1	1	1	1	1	1	1	1	1	1	1	1	1	1	1	1	1	1	1	1	1
Points	3	6	9	12	15	18	21	24	25	28	31	34	37	40	43	46	49	52	55	58	61	64	67	70	73	76	79	79	82	83	86	86	89	92	93	93	96	99

Source: Premier League
A = Away; H = Home; W = Win; D = Draw; L = Loss; P = Postponed
Notes:
- ^{1} Matchday 18 (v. West Ham United) was postponed due to Liverpool's participation in the FIFA Club World Cup.

==== Matches ====
The league fixtures were announced on 13 June 2019.

9 August 2019 1	Liverpool	4–1	Norwich City	Liverpool
20:00 BST	Hanley 7' (o.g.); Salah 19'; Van Dijk 28'; Origi 42'	Report	Leitner (yellow card) 60'; Pukki 64'; Buendía (yellow card) 65'	Stadium: Anfield; Attendance: 53,333; Referee: Michael Oliver

17 August 2019 2	Southampton	1–2	Liverpool	Southampton
15:00 BST	Romeu (yellow card) 36'; Ings 83'; Djenepo (yellow card) 84'	Report	Mané 45+1'; Firmino 71'; Alexander-Arnold (yellow card) 79'	Stadium: St Mary's Stadium; Attendance: 31,712; Referee: Andre Marriner

24 August 2019 3	Liverpool	3–1	Arsenal	Liverpool
17:30 BST	Matip 41'; Salah 49' (pen.), 58'; Fabinho (yellow card) 90+3'	Report	David Luiz (yellow card) 48'; Torreira 85'	Stadium: Anfield; Attendance: 53,298; Referee: Anthony Taylor
Note: Fixture was initially scheduled for a 15:00 kick-off, but was moved for live Sky Sports broadcast.

31 August 2019 4	Burnley	0–3	Liverpool	Burnley
17:30 BST		Report	Wood 33' (o.g.); Mané 37'; Firmino 80'	Stadium: Turf Moor; Attendance: 21,762; Referee: Chris Kavanagh
Note: Fixture was initially scheduled for a 15:00 kick-off, but was moved for live Sky Sports broadcast.

14 September 2019 5	Liverpool	3–1	Newcastle United	Liverpool
12:30 BST	Mané 28', 40'; Salah 72'	Report	Willems 7'	Stadium: Anfield; Attendance: 51,430; Referee: Andre Marriner
Note: Fixture was initially scheduled for a 15:00 kick-off, but was moved for live BT Sport broadcast.

22 September 2019 6	Chelsea	1–2	Liverpool	Fulham
16:30 BST	Tomori (yellow card) 20'; Kanté 71'; Kovačić (yellow card) 84'; Alonso (yellow card) 90+4'	Report	Alexander-Arnold 14', (yellow card) 57'; Firmino 30'; Fabinho (yellow card) 78'; Milner (yellow card) 86'	Stadium: Stamford Bridge; Attendance: 40,638; Referee: Michael Oliver
Note: Fixture was initially scheduled for 21 September, but was moved for live Sky Sports broadcast.

28 September 2019 7	Sheffield United	0–1	Liverpool	Sheffield
12:30 BST	O'Connell (yellow card) 63'	Report	Wijnaldum 70'; Adrián (yellow card) 83'	Stadium: Bramall Lane; Attendance: 31,774; Referee: Anthony Taylor
Note: Fixture was initially scheduled for a 15:00 kick-off, but was moved for live BT Sport broadcast.

5 October 2019 8	Liverpool	2–1	Leicester City	Liverpool
15:00 BST	Fabinho (yellow card) 39'; Mané 40'; Milner 90+5' (pen.)	Report	Ndidi (yellow card) 30'; Söyüncü (yellow card) 53'; Evans (yellow card) 69'; Maddison 80'; Choudhury (yellow card) 89'	Stadium: Anfield; Attendance: 53,322; Referee: Chris Kavanagh

20 October 2019 9	Manchester United	1–1	Liverpool	Trafford
16:30 BST	Rashford 36'	Report	Fabinho (yellow card) 70'; Lallana 85'	Stadium: Old Trafford; Attendance: 73,737; Referee: Martin Atkinson
Note: Fixture was initially scheduled for 19 October, but was moved for live Sky Sports broadcast.

27 October 2019 10	Liverpool	2–1	Tottenham Hotspur	Liverpool
16:30 GMT	Lovren (yellow card) 50'; Henderson 52'; Alexander-Arnold (yellow card) 64'; Salah 75' (pen.); Milner (yellow card) 90+1'	Report	Kane 1'; Sissoko (yellow card) 36'; Rose (yellow card) 37'; Ndombele (yellow card) 72'	Stadium: Anfield; Attendance: 53,222; Referee: Anthony Taylor
Note: Fixture was initially scheduled for 26 October, but was moved for live Sky Sports broadcast.

2 November 2019 11	Aston Villa	1–2	Liverpool	Birmingham
15:00 GMT	Trézéguet 21'; El Ghazi (yellow card) 81'	Report	Mané (yellow card) 37', (goal) 90+4'; Van Dijk (yellow card) 58'; Robertson 87'	Stadium: Villa Park; Attendance: 41,878; Referee: Jon Moss

10 November 2019 12	Liverpool	3–1	Manchester City	Liverpool
16:30 GMT	Fabinho 6'; Salah 13'; Mané 51'	Report	Rodri (yellow card) 65'; B. Silva 78'; Jesus (yellow card) 90+5'	Stadium: Anfield; Attendance: 53,324; Referee: Michael Oliver
Note: Fixture was initially scheduled for 9 November, but was moved for live Sky Sports broadcast.

23 November 2019 13	Crystal Palace	1–2	Liverpool	Selhurst
15:00 GMT	Zaha 82'	Report	Mané 49'; Fabinho (yellow card) 54'; Firmino 85'	Stadium: Selhurst Park; Attendance: 25,486; Referee: Kevin Friend

30 November 2019 14	Liverpool	2–1	Brighton & Hove Albion	Liverpool
15:00 GMT	Van Dijk 18', 24'; Alisson (red card) 76'	Report	Dunk 79'	Stadium: Anfield; Attendance: 53,319; Referee: Martin Atkinson

4 December 2019 15	Liverpool	5–2	Everton	Liverpool
20:15 GMT	Origi 6', 31'; Shaqiri 17'; Alexander-Arnold (yellow card) 27'; Mané 45'; Wijnaldum 90'	Report	Keane 21'; Richarlison (yellow card) 31', (goal) 45+3'; Davies (yellow card) 67'	Stadium: Anfield; Attendance: 53,094; Referee: Mike Dean
Note: Fixture was initially scheduled for a 19:45 kick-off, but was moved for live Amazon Prime Video broadcast.

7 December 2019 16	Bournemouth	0–3	Liverpool	Bournemouth
15:00 GMT		Report	Oxlade-Chamberlain 35'; Gomez (yellow card) 39'; Keïta 44'; Salah 54'	Stadium: Dean Court; Attendance: 10,832; Referee: Chris Kavanagh

14 December 2019 17	Liverpool	2–0	Watford	Liverpool
12:30 GMT	Salah 38', 90'; Henderson (yellow card) 43'; Milner (yellow card) 57'	Report	Hughes (yellow card) 24'	Stadium: Anfield; Attendance: 53,311; Referee: Andre Marriner
Note: Fixture was initially scheduled for a 15:00 kick-off, but was moved for live BT Sport broadcast.

26 December 2019 19	Leicester City	0–4	Liverpool	Leicester
20:00 GMT	Maddison (yellow card) 73'	Report	Firmino 31', 74'; Gomez (yellow card) 62'; Milner 71' (pen.); Alexander-Arnold 78'	Stadium: King Power Stadium; Attendance: 32,211; Referee: Michael Oliver
Note: Fixture was initially scheduled for a 15:00 kick-off, but was moved for live Amazon Prime Video broadcast.

29 December 2019 20	Liverpool	1–0	Wolverhampton Wanderers	Liverpool
16:30 GMT	Mané 42'; Lallana (yellow card) 45+1'	Report		Stadium: Anfield; Attendance: 53,326; Referee: Anthony Taylor
Note: Fixture was initially scheduled for 28 December, but was moved for live Sky Sports broadcast.

2 January 2020 21	Liverpool	2–0	Sheffield United	Liverpool
20:00 GMT	Salah 4'; Mané 64'	Report		Stadium: Anfield; Attendance: 53,321; Referee: Paul Tierney
Note: Fixture was initially scheduled for 1 January, but was moved for live BT Sport broadcast.

11 January 2020 22	Tottenham Hotspur	0–1	Liverpool	Tottenham
17:30 GMT		Report	Gomez (yellow card) 23'; Firmino 37'; Oxlade-Chamberlain (yellow card) 39'	Stadium: Tottenham Hotspur Stadium; Attendance: 61,023; Referee: Martin Atkinson
Note: Fixture was initially scheduled for a 15:00 kick-off, but was moved for live Sky Sports broadcast.

19 January 2020 23	Liverpool	2–0	Manchester United	Liverpool
16:30 GMT	Van Dijk 14'; Salah 90+3', (yellow card) 90+4'	Report	Matić (yellow card) 8'; De Gea (yellow card) 25'; Shaw (yellow card) 72'	Stadium: Anfield; Attendance: 52,916; Referee: Craig Pawson
Note: Fixture was initially scheduled for 18 January, but was moved for live Sky Sports broadcast.

23 January 2020 24	Wolverhampton Wanderers	1–2	Liverpool	Wolverhampton
20:00 GMT	Jiménez 51'	Report	Henderson 8'; Robertson (yellow card) 55'; Firmino 84'	Stadium: Molineux Stadium; Attendance: 31,746; Referee: Michael Oliver
Note: Fixture was initially scheduled for 21 January, but was moved for live BT Sport broadcast.

29 January 2020 18	West Ham United	0–2	Liverpool	Stratford
19:45 GMT	Diop (yellow card) 34'; Noble (yellow card) 43'	Report	Salah 35' (pen.); Oxlade-Chamberlain 52'	Stadium: London Stadium; Attendance: 59,959; Referee: Jon Moss
Note: Fixture was initially scheduled for 21 December, but was postponed due to Liverpool's participation in the FIFA Club World Cup.

1 February 2020 25	Liverpool	4–0	Southampton	Liverpool
15:00 GMT	Oxlade-Chamberlain 47'; Henderson 60'; Salah 71', 90'	Report	Ward-Prowse (yellow card) 65'; Stephens (yellow card) 89'	Stadium: Anfield; Attendance: 53,291; Referee: Kevin Friend

15 February 2020 26	Norwich City	0–1	Liverpool	Norwich
17:30 GMT	Hanley (yellow card) 41'	Report	Mané 78', (yellow card) 90'; Keïta (yellow card) 83'	Stadium: Carrow Road; Attendance: 27,110; Referee: Stuart Attwell
Note: Fixture was initially scheduled for 8 February, but was moved for the mid-season player break and live Sky Sports broadcast.

24 February 2020 27	Liverpool	3–2	West Ham United	Liverpool
20:00 GMT	Wijnaldum 9'; Salah 68'; Mané 81'	Report	Diop 12', (yellow card) 66'; Rice (yellow card) 51'; Fornals 54'; Noble (yellow card) 80'	Stadium: Anfield; Attendance: 53,313; Referee: Jon Moss
Note: Fixture was initially scheduled for 22 February, but was moved for live Sky Sports broadcast.

29 February 2020 28	Watford	3–0	Liverpool	Watford
17:30 GMT	Sarr 54', 60'; Deeney 72'	Report		Stadium: Vicarage Road; Attendance: 21,634; Referee: Michael Oliver
Note: Fixture was initially scheduled for a 15:00 kick-off, but was moved for live Sky Sports broadcast.

7 March 2020 29	Liverpool	2–1	Bournemouth	Liverpool
12:30 GMT	Salah 24'; Mané 33'	Report	C. Wilson 9', (yellow card) 90+2'	Stadium: Anfield; Attendance: 53,323; Referee: Paul Tierney
Note: Fixture was initially scheduled for a 15:00 kick-off, but was moved for live BT Sport broadcast.

21 June 2020 30	Everton	0–0	Liverpool	Liverpool
19:00 BST	Keane (yellow card) 40'; Digne (yellow card) 61'	Report	Milner (yellow card) 20'; Origi (yellow card) 85'	Stadium: Goodison Park; Attendance: 0 Referee: Mike Dean
Note: Fixture was initially scheduled for 14 March, but was postponed due to the COVID-19 pandemic in the United Kingdom.

24 June 2020 31	Liverpool	4–0	Crystal Palace	Liverpool
20:15 BST	Alexander-Arnold 23'; Salah 44'; Fabinho 55'; Mané 69'	Report		Stadium: Anfield; Attendance: 0 Referee: Martin Atkinson
Note: Fixture was initially scheduled for 21 March, but was postponed due to the COVID-19 pandemic in the United Kingdom.

2 July 2020 32	Manchester City	4–0	Liverpool	Manchester
20:15 BST	De Bruyne 25' (pen.); Sterling 35'; Mendy (yellow card) 41'; Foden 45'; Walker (yellow card) 56'; Oxlade-Chamberlain 66' (o.g.)	Report	Gomez (yellow card) 24'; Henderson (yellow card) 90+1'	Stadium: City of Manchester Stadium; Attendance: 0 Referee: Anthony Taylor
Note: Fixture was initially scheduled for 4 April, but was postponed due to the COVID-19 pandemic in the United Kingdom.

5 July 2020 33	Liverpool	2–0	Aston Villa	Liverpool
16:30 BST	Robertson (yellow card) 20'; Mané 71'; Jones 89'	Report	McGinn (yellow card) 36'	Stadium: Anfield; Attendance: 0 Referee: Paul Tierney
Note: Fixture was initially scheduled for 11 April, but was postponed due to the COVID-19 pandemic in the United Kingdom.

8 July 2020 34	Brighton & Hove Albion	1–3	Liverpool	Brighton and Hove
20:15 BST	Trossard 45'; Lamptey (yellow card) 85'	Report	Salah 6', 76'; Henderson 8'; Williams (yellow card) 41'; Mané (yellow card) 62'; Fabinho (yellow card) 78'; Gomez (yellow card) 89'	Stadium: Falmer Stadium; Attendance: 0 Referee: Craig Pawson
Note: Fixture was initially scheduled for 18 April, but was postponed due to the COVID-19 pandemic in the United Kingdom.

11 July 2020 35	Liverpool	1–1	Burnley	Liverpool
15:00 BST	Robertson 34'; Gomez (yellow card) 80'	Report	Rodriguez 69'; Bardsley (yellow card) 88'; Pope (yellow card) 89'	Stadium: Anfield; Attendance: 0 Referee: David Coote
Note: Fixture was initially scheduled for 25 April, but was postponed due to the COVID-19 pandemic in the United Kingdom.

15 July 2020 36	Arsenal	2–1	Liverpool	Holloway
20:15 BST	Lacazette 32'; Nelson 44'; Torreira (yellow card) 46'; Xhaka (yellow card) 81'; Ceballos (yellow card) 90+1'	Report	Mané 20'; Alexander-Arnold (yellow card) 48'	Stadium: Emirates Stadium; Attendance: 0 Referee: Paul Tierney
Note: Fixture was initially scheduled for 2 May, but was postponed due to the COVID-19 pandemic in the United Kingdom.

22 July 2020 37	Liverpool	5–3	Chelsea	Liverpool
20:15 BST	Keïta 23'; Alexander-Arnold 38'; Wijnaldum 43'; Firmino 54'; Gomez (yellow card) 83'; Oxlade-Chamberlain 84'	Report	Giroud 45+3'; Abraham 61'; Pulisic 73'	Stadium: Anfield; Attendance: 0 Referee: Andre Marriner
Note: Fixture was initially scheduled for 9 May, but was postponed due to the COVID-19 pandemic in the United Kingdom.

26 July 2020 38	Newcastle United	1–3	Liverpool	Newcastle upon Tyne
16:00 BST	Gayle 1'; Fernández (yellow card) 33'	Report	Van Dijk 38'; Origi 59'; Mané 89'	Stadium: St James' Park; Attendance: 0 Referee: Anthony Taylor
Note: Fixture was initially scheduled for 17 May, but was postponed due to the COVID-19 pandemic in the United Kingdom.

=== FA Cup ===
Liverpool entered the competition in the third round. The draw for the third round was made on 2 December 2019. The fourth round draw was made by Alex Scott and David O'Leary on Monday, 6 January 2020. The draw for the fifth round was made on 27 January 2020.

5 January 2020 Third round	Liverpool	1–0	Everton	Liverpool
16:01 GMT	Jones 71'	Report	Digne (yellow card) 57'	Stadium: Anfield; Attendance: 52,583; Referee: Jon Moss
Note: Live on BBC One

26 January 2020 Fourth round	Shrewsbury Town	2–2	Liverpool	Shrewsbury
17:00 GMT	Cummings 65' (pen.), 75'	Report	Jones 15'; Love 46' (o.g.); Larouci (yellow card) 64'	Stadium: New Meadow; Attendance: 9,510; Referee: Simon Hooper
Note: Live on BBC One

4 February 2020 Fourth round replay	Liverpool	1–0	Shrewsbury Town	Liverpool
19:45 GMT	N. Williams (yellow card) 40'; R. Williams 75' (o.g.)	Report	Golbourne (yellow card) 32'; Love (yellow card) 65'	Stadium: Anfield; Attendance: 52,399; Referee: Andy Madley

3 March 2020 Fifth round	Chelsea	2–0	Liverpool	Fulham
19:45 GMT	Willian 13'; Barkley 64'	Report	Fabinho (yellow card) 61'; Milner (yellow card) 76'; Mané (yellow card) 90+4'	Stadium: Stamford Bridge; Attendance: 40,103; Referee: Chris Kavanagh
Note: Live on BBC One

=== EFL Cup ===
Liverpool entered the competition in the third round. The draw was confirmed on 28 August 2019, live on Sky Sports. The draw for the fourth round was made on 25 September. The quarter-final draw was conducted on 31 October, live on BBC Radio 2.

25 September 2019 Third round	Milton Keynes Dons	0–2	Liverpool	Milton Keynes
19:45 BST		Report	Milner 41'; Hoever 69'	Stadium: Stadium MK; Attendance: 28,521; Referee: Oliver Langford
Note: Live on Sky Sports

30 October 2019 Fourth round	Liverpool	5–5 (5–4 p)	Arsenal	Liverpool
19:30 GMT	Mustafi 6' (o.g.); Brewster (yellow card) 24'; Milner 43' (pen.); Lallana (yellow card) 44'; Oxlade-Chamberlain 58'; Origi 62', 90+4'	Report	Torreira 19'; Martinelli 26', 36'; Maitland-Niles 54'; Willock (yellow card) 64', (goal) 70'; Kolašinac (yellow card) 77'; Saka (yellow card) 85'	Stadium: Anfield; Attendance: 52,694; Referee: Andre Marriner
	Penalties
	Milner (penalty scored); Lallana (penalty scored); Brewster (penalty scored); Origi (penalty scored); Jones (penalty scored)		(penalty scored) Bellerín; (penalty scored) Guendouzi; (penalty scored) Martinelli; (penalty missed) Ceballos; (penalty scored) Maitland-Niles
Note: Live on Sky Sports

17 December 2019 Quarter-finals	Aston Villa	5–0	Liverpool	Birmingham
19:45 GMT	Hourihane 14'; Boyes 17' (o.g.); Kodjia 37', 45'; Wesley 90+2'	Report	Christie-Davies (yellow card) 41'	Stadium: Villa Park; Attendance: 30,323; Referee: Lee Mason
Note: Live on Sky Sports

=== UEFA Champions League ===
Liverpool entered the competition in the group stage.

==== Group stage ====
The draw for the group stage was held on 29 August 2019.

Pos	Team	Pld	W	D	L	GF	GA	GD	Pts	Qualification	LIV	NAP	SAL	GNK
1	(England) Liverpool	6	4	1	1	13	8	+5	13	Advance to knockout phase	—	1–1	4–3	2–1
2	(Italy) Napoli	6	3	3	0	11	4	+7	12	Advance to knockout phase	2–0	—	1–1	4–0
3	(Austria) Red Bull Salzburg	6	2	1	3	16	13	+3	7	Transfer to Europa League	0–2	2–3	—	6–2
4	(Belgium) Genk	6	0	1	5	5	20	−15	1		1–4	0–0	1–4	—

Source: UEFA
Rules for classification: Group stage tiebreakers

17 September 2019 1	Napoli (Italy)	2–0	(England) Liverpool	Naples, Italy
20:00 BST	Mertens 82' (pen.); Llorente (yellow card) 90', (goal) 90+2'	Report	Robertson (yellow card) 57'; Milner (yellow card) 61'	Stadium: Stadio San Paolo; Attendance: 38,878; Referee: Felix Brych (Germany)

2 October 2019 2	Liverpool (England)	4–3	(Austria) Red Bull Salzburg	Liverpool, England
20:00 BST	Mané 9'; Robertson 25'; Salah 36', 69'; Fabinho (yellow card) 86'	Report	Hwang Hee-chan 39'; Minamino 56'; Haaland 60'	Stadium: Anfield; Attendance: 52,243; Referee: Andreas Ekberg (Sweden)

23 October 2019 3	Genk (Belgium)	1–4	(England) Liverpool	Genk, Belgium
20:00 BST	Odey (yellow card) 84', (goal) 88'	Report	Oxlade-Chamberlain 2', 57'; Gomez (yellow card) 70'; Mané 77'; Salah 87'	Stadium: Luminus Arena; Attendance: 19,626; Referee: Slavko Vinčić (Slovenia)

5 November 2019 4	Liverpool (England)	2–1	(Belgium) Genk	Liverpool, England
20:00 GMT	Wijnaldum 14'; Oxlade-Chamberlain 53'	Report	Lucumí (yellow card) 22'; Samatta 40'; De Norre (yellow card) 83'	Stadium: Anfield; Attendance: 52,611; Referee: Ivan Kružliak (Slovakia)

27 November 2019 5	Liverpool (England)	1–1	(Italy) Napoli	Liverpool, England
20:00 GMT	Lovren 65'; Robertson (yellow card) 90+2'	Report	Mertens 21'; Koulibaly (yellow card) 90+2'; Allan (yellow card) 90+4'	Stadium: Anfield; Attendance: 52,128; Referee: Carlos del Cerro Grande (Spain)

10 December 2019 6	Red Bull Salzburg (Austria)	0–2	(England) Liverpool	Wals-Siezenheim, Austria
17:55 GMT		Report	Mané (yellow card) 51'; Keïta 57'; Salah 58'	Stadium: Stadion Wals-Siezenheim; Attendance: 29,520; Referee: Danny Makkelie (Netherlands)

==== Knockout phase ====
The draw for the round of 16 was confirmed on 16 December.

===== Round of 16 =====
18 February 2020 First leg	Atlético Madrid (Spain)	1–0	(England) Liverpool	Madrid, Spain
20:00 GMT	Saúl 4'; Correa (yellow card) 45'	Report	Mané (yellow card) 40'; Gomez (yellow card) 59'	Stadium: Wanda Metropolitano; Attendance: 67,443; Referee: Szymon Marciniak (Poland)

11 March 2020 Second leg	Liverpool (England)	2–3 (a.e.t.) (2–4 agg.)	(Spain) Atlético Madrid	Liverpool, England
20:00 GMT	Wijnaldum 43'; Firmino 94'; Alexander-Arnold (yellow card) 119'	Report	Llorente 97', 105+1'; Morata (yellow card) 119', (goal) 120+1'; Saúl (yellow card) 120'	Stadium: Anfield; Attendance: 52,267; Referee: Danny Makkelie (Netherlands)

== Squad statistics ==
=== Appearances ===
Players with no appearances are not included on the list.

No.	Pos.	Nat.	Player	Premier League		FA Cup		EFL Cup		Champions League		Other (Note: Includes Community Shield, UEFA Super Cup and FIFA Club World Cup)		Total	
No.	Pos.	Nat.	Player	Apps	Starts	Apps	Starts	Apps	Starts	Apps	Starts	Apps	Starts	Apps	Starts
1	GK	(Brazil)	Alisson	29	29	0	0	0	0	5	5	3	3	37	37
3	MF	(Brazil)	Fabinho	28	22	2	2	0	0	7	6	2	2	39	32
4	DF	(Netherlands)	Virgil van Dijk	38	38	1	1	0	0	8	8	3	3	50	50
5	MF	(Netherlands)	Georginio Wijnaldum	37	35	0	0	0	0	8	5	2	1	47	41
6	DF	(Croatia)	Dejan Lovren	10	9	1	1	1	1	3	3	0	0	15	14
7	MF	(England)	James Milner	22	9	2	1	2	2	8	4	3	2	37	18
8	MF	(Guinea)	Naby Keïta	18	9	0	0	2	2	4	3	3	2	27	16
9	FW	(Brazil)	Roberto Firmino	38	34	2	0	0	0	8	7	4	2	52	43
10	FW	(Senegal)	Sadio Mané	35	31	1	1	0	0	8	7	3	2	47	41
11	FW	(Egypt)	Mohamed Salah	34	33	2	0	0	0	8	8	4	4	48	45
12	DF	(England)	Joe Gomez	28	22	2	2	2	2	7	5	4	4	43	35
13	GK	(Spain)	Adrián	11	9	3	3	0	0	3	3	1	1	18	16
14	MF	(England)	Jordan Henderson	30	26	0	0	0	0	6	6	4	4	40	36
15	MF	(England)	Alex Oxlade-Chamberlain	30	17	2	0	2	2	5	3	4	3	43	25
18	FW	(Japan)	Takumi Minamino	10	2	3	3	0	0	1	0	0	0	14	5
20	MF	(England)	Adam Lallana	15	3	2	2	2	2	0	0	3	1	22	8
23	MF	(Switzerland)	Xherdan Shaqiri	7	2	0	0	0	0	1	0	3	1	11	3
26	DF	(Scotland)	Andy Robertson	36	34	1	1	0	0	8	7	4	4	49	46
27	FW	(Belgium)	Divock Origi	28	7	3	3	1	1	6	1	4	2	42	14
32	DF	(Cameroon)	Joël Matip	9	8	1	1	0	0	1	1	2	1	13	11
46	DF	(England)	Adam Lewis	0	0	1	1	0	0	0	0	0	0	1	1
48	MF	(England)	Curtis Jones	6	1	4	4	2	1	0	0	0	0	12	6
49	FW	(Canada)	Liam Millar	0	0	1	1	0	0	0	0	0	0	1	1
51	DF	(Netherlands)	Ki-Jana Hoever	0	0	1	1	2	2	0	0	0	0	3	3
53	FW	(England)	Joe Hardy	0	0	1	0	0	0	0	0	0	0	1	0
54	DF	(Scotland)	Tony Gallacher	0	0	0	0	1	1	0	0	0	0	1	1
62	GK	(Republic of Ireland)	Caoimhín Kelleher	0	0	1	1	3	3	0	0	0	0	4	4
66	DF	(England)	Trent Alexander-Arnold	38	35	0	0	0	0	7	6	4	2	49	43
67	MF	(England)	Harvey Elliott	2	0	3	3	3	3	0	0	0	0	8	6
68	MF	(Spain)	Pedro Chirivella	0	0	3	3	3	1	0	0	0	0	6	4
69	MF	(England)	Elijah Dixon-Bonner	0	0	1	0	0	0	0	0	0	0	1	0
70	DF	(Algeria)	Yasser Larouci	0	0	2	1	0	0	0	0	0	0	2	1
72	DF	(Netherlands)	Sepp van den Berg	0	0	1	1	3	2	0	0	0	0	4	3
75	MF	(England)	Luis Longstaff	0	0	0	0	1	1	0	0	0	0	1	1
76	DF	(Wales)	Neco Williams	6	3	4	4	1	1	0	0	0	0	11	8
77	DF	(Wales)	Morgan Boyes	0	0	1	0	1	1	0	0	0	0	2	1
80	MF	(England)	Jake Cain	0	0	1	1	0	0	0	0	0	0	1	1
81	MF	(England)	Jack Bearne	0	0	0	0	1	0	0	0	0	0	1	0
84	MF	(England)	Leighton Clarkson	0	0	1	1	1	0	0	0	0	0	2	1
93	DF	(England)	James Norris	0	0	0	0	1	0	0	0	0	0	1	0
99	MF	(England)	Thomas Hill	0	0	0	0	1	1	0	0	0	0	1	1
Players who went out on loan or left permanently but made appearances for Liverpool prior to departing
24	FW	(England)	Rhian Brewster	0	0	1	0	2	2	0	0	0	0	3	2
47	DF	(England)	Nat Phillips	0	0	1	1	0	0	0	0	0	0	1	1
55	MF	(England)	Herbie Kane	0	0	0	0	2	1	0	0	0	0	2	1
57	MF	(Wales)	Isaac Christie-Davies	0	0	0	0	1	1	0	0	0	0	1	1
Total				38		4		3		8		4		57	

=== Goals ===
Rank	Pos.	No.	Player	Premier League	FA Cup	EFL Cup	Champions League	Other	Total
1	FW	11	(Egypt) Mohamed Salah	19	0	0	4	0	23
2	FW	10	(Senegal) Sadio Mané	18	0	0	2	2	22
3	FW	9	(Brazil) Roberto Firmino	9	0	0	1	2	12
4	MF	15	(England) Alex Oxlade-Chamberlain	4	0	1	3	0	8
5	MF	5	(Netherlands) Georginio Wijnaldum	4	0	0	2	0	6
5	FW	27	(Belgium) Divock Origi	4	0	2	0	0	6
7	DF	4	(Netherlands) Virgil van Dijk	5	0	0	0	0	5
8	MF	7	(England) James Milner	2	0	2	0	0	4
8	MF	8	(Guinea) Naby Keïta	2	0	0	1	1	4
8	MF	14	(England) Jordan Henderson	4	0	0	0	0	4
8	DF	66	(England) Trent Alexander-Arnold	4	0	0	0	0	4
12	DF	26	(Scotland) Andy Robertson	2	0	0	1	0	3
12	MF	48	(England) Curtis Jones	1	2	0	0	0	3
14	MF	3	(Brazil) Fabinho	2	0	0	0	0	2
14	DF	32	(Cameroon) Joël Matip	1	0	0	0	1	2
16	DF	6	(Croatia) Dejan Lovren	0	0	0	1	0	1
16	MF	20	(England) Adam Lallana	1	0	0	0	0	1
16	MF	23	(Switzerland) Xherdan Shaqiri	1	0	0	0	0	1
16	DF	51	(Netherlands) Ki-Jana Hoever	0	0	1	0	0	1
Own goals				2	2	1	0	0	5
Total				85	4	7	15	6	117

=== Clean sheets ===
No.	Player	Premier League	FA Cup	EFL Cup	Champions League	Other	Total
1	(Brazil) Alisson Becker	13	0	0	1	1	15
13	(Spain) Adrián	2	1	0	0	0	3
62	(Republic of Ireland) Caoimhín Kelleher	0	1	1	0	0	2
Total		15	2	1	1	1	20

=== Disciplinary record ===
No.	Pos.	Player	Premier League		FA Cup		EFL Cup		Champions League		Other		Total	
No.	Pos.	Player	Yellow card	Red card	Yellow card	Red card	Yellow card	Red card	Yellow card	Red card	Yellow card	Red card	Yellow card	Red card
1	GK	(Brazil) Alisson Becker	0	1	0	0	0	0	0	0	0	0	0	1
3	MF	(Brazil) Fabinho	6	0	1	0	0	0	1	0	0	0	8	0
4	DF	(Netherlands) Virgil van Dijk	1	0	0	0	0	0	0	0	0	0	1	0
6	DF	(Croatia) Dejan Lovren	1	0	0	0	0	0	0	0	0	0	1	0
7	MF	(England) James Milner	4	0	1	0	0	0	1	0	1	0	7	0
8	MF	(Guinea) Naby Keïta	1	0	0	0	0	0	0	0	0	0	1	0
9	FW	(Brazil) Roberto Firmino	0	0	0	0	0	0	0	0	1	0	1	0
10	FW	(Senegal) Sadio Mané	3	0	1	0	0	0	2	0	1	0	7	0
11	FW	(Egypt) Mohamed Salah	1	0	0	0	0	0	0	0	1	0	2	0
12	DF	(England) Joe Gomez	7	0	0	0	0	0	2	0	1	0	10	0
13	GK	(Spain) Adrián	1	0	0	0	0	0	0	0	0	0	1	0
14	MF	(England) Jordan Henderson	2	0	0	0	0	0	0	0	1	0	3	0
15	MF	(England) Alex Oxlade-Chamberlain	1	0	0	0	0	0	0	0	0	0	1	0
20	MF	(England) Adam Lallana	1	0	0	0	1	0	0	0	0	0	2	0
24	FW	(England) Rhian Brewster	0	0	0	0	1	0	0	0	0	0	1	0
26	DF	(Scotland) Andy Robertson	2	0	0	0	0	0	2	0	0	0	4	0
27	FW	(Belgium) Divock Origi	1	0	0	0	0	0	0	0	0	0	1	0
57	MF	(Wales) Isaac Christie-Davies	0	0	0	0	1	0	0	0	0	0	1	0
66	DF	(England) Trent Alexander-Arnold	5	0	0	0	0	0	1	0	1	0	7	0
70	DF	(Algeria) Yasser Larouci	0	0	1	0	0	0	0	0	0	0	1	0
76	DF	(Wales) Neco Williams	1	0	1	0	0	0	0	0	0	0	2	0
Total			38	1	5	0	3	0	9	0	7	0	62	1

== Club awards ==
=== End-of-season award ===
Standard Chartered Men's Player of the Season: Jordan Henderson

=== Liverpool Standard Chartered Player of the Month award ===
Awarded monthly to the player that was chosen by fans voting on Liverpoolfc.com

Month	Player	Ref.
August	(Egypt) Mohamed Salah	
September	(Brazil) Roberto Firmino	
October	(England) Alex Oxlade-Chamberlain	
November	(Senegal) Sadio Mané	
December	(England) Trent Alexander-Arnold	
January	(Egypt) Mohamed Salah	
February	(England) Trent Alexander-Arnold	
