= Joe Gomez =

English footballer (born 1997)

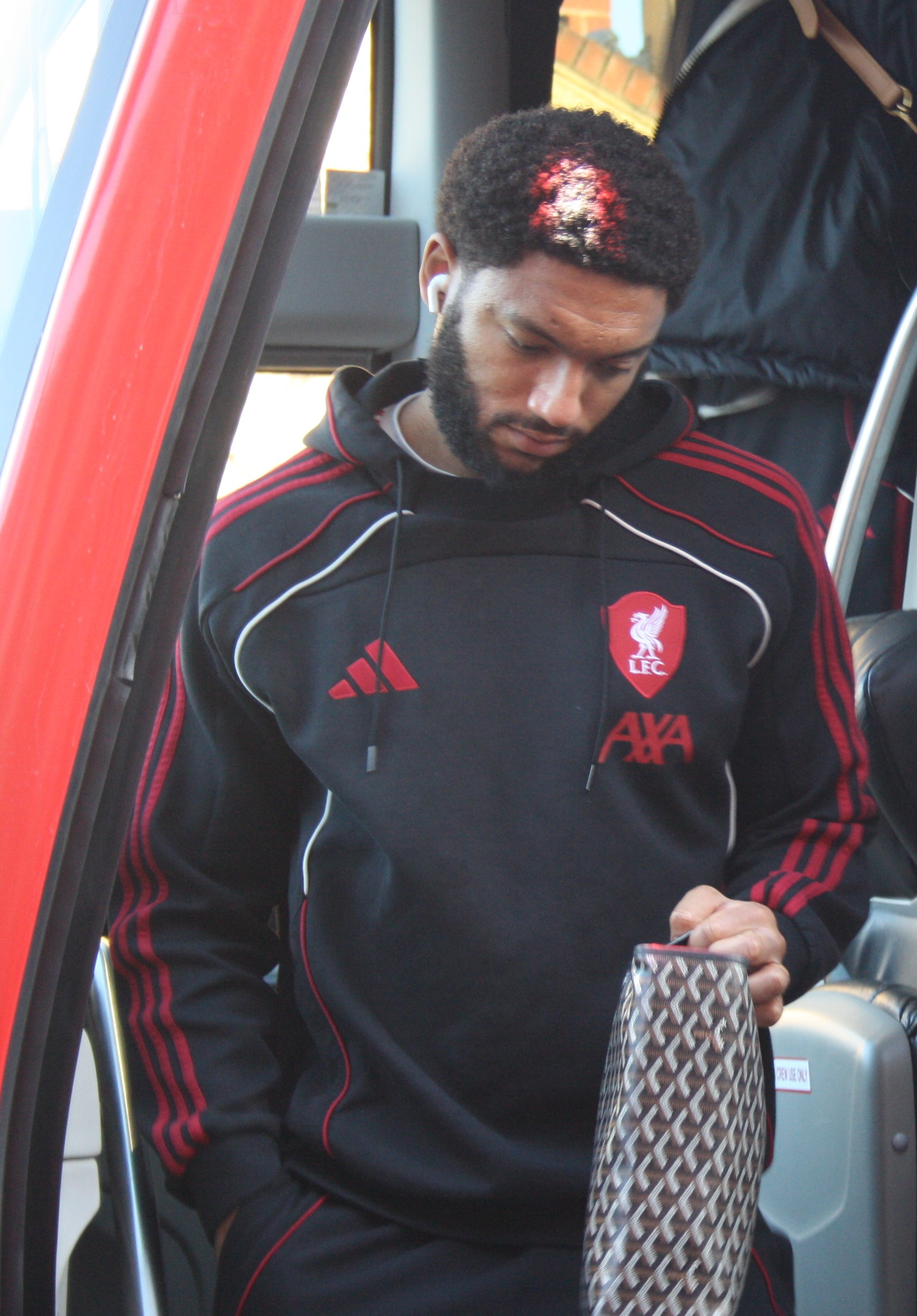
- Gomez with Liverpool in 2026

Personal information
- Full name: Joseph David Gomez
- Date of birth: 23 May 1997 (age 29)
- Place of birth: Catford, Greater London, England
- Height: 6 ft 2 in (1.88 m)
- Position: Defender

Team information
- Current team: Liverpool
- Number: 2

Youth career
- 2007–2014: Charlton Athletic

Senior career*
| Years | Team | Apps | (Gls) |
| 2014–2015 | Charlton Athletic | 21 | (0) |
| 2015– | Liverpool | 174 | (0) |

International career
| 2012 | England U16 | 2 | (0) |
| 2013–2014 | England U17 | 19 | (0) |
| 2014–2015 | England U19 | 4 | (0) |
| 2015–2017 | England U21 | 7 | (0) |
| 2017–2024 | England | 15 | (0) |
Medal record
Men's football
Representing England
UEFA European Championship
| Runner-up | 2024 Germany | Team |
UEFA Nations League
| Third place | 2019 Portugal | Team |
- * Club domestic league appearances and goals as of 22 November 2026 (UTC)

Joseph David Gomez (born 23 May 1997) is an English professional footballer who plays as a defender for Premier League club Liverpool.

Gomez began his career at Charlton Athletic, breaking into the first team at 17 and playing one full season before joining Liverpool in June 2015. After establishing himself as a first-team regular, Gomez struggled with injuries, but appeared in the 2019 UEFA Champions League final as Liverpool won the competition. He played in the final of the 2019 FIFA Club World Cup with Liverpool winning the competition for the first time in the club's history. He was part of the team that won the 2019–20 Premier League, Liverpool's first league title in 30 years. As of October 2026, he is the longest-serving player of Liverpool.

Gomez has represented England at every level and played every minute of every match when England won the 2014 UEFA European Under-17 Championship. He made his debut for the England senior team in November 2017, and was a part of the squad for UEFA Euro 2024.

== Early life ==
Gomez was born on 23 May 1997 in Catford, Greater London, to a Gambian father, Augustus Gomez, and an English mother.

== Club career ==
=== Early career ===
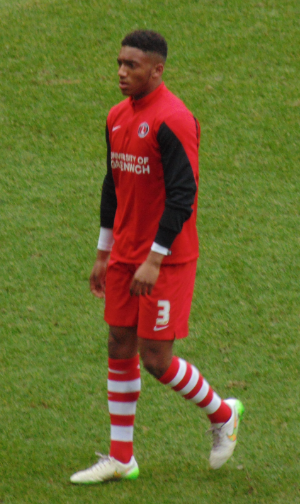
Gomez warming up for Charlton Athletic in 2015

He joined the academy at nearby Charlton Athletic at the age of 10, making his debut for the club's under-18 team at just 13 years old. Despite strong interest from other clubs, Gomez signed his first professional contract with Charlton in October 2014. His first-team debut came under manager Bob Peeters in a 4–0 home victory over Colchester United on 12 August 2014 in the 2014–15 League Cup, playing the full 90 minutes at right-back. A week later he made his league debut in a 3–2 home win against Derby County in the Championship. Gomez went on to make 24 appearances during his first season.

=== Liverpool ===
==== 2015–2017 ====
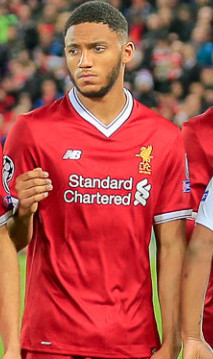
Gomez lining up for Liverpool in 2017

On 20 June 2015, Premier League club Liverpool signed Gomez on a five-year contract for a fee of £3.5 million. He made his debut against Stoke City on 9 August, starting as a left-back in a 1–0 win, assisting Philippe Coutinho's match-winning goal in the 86th minute.

On 13 October 2015, Gomez suffered a season-ending anterior cruciate ligament (ACL) injury while playing for England U21. A full year later, Gomez returned to full first-team training on 13 October 2016. On 13 November, Gomez played 45 minutes in a behind closed doors friendly match at Melwood. On 8 January 2017, Gomez made his first start since the injury in an FA Cup 0–0 home draw against Plymouth Argyle.

==== 2017–2019 ====
On 23 August 2017, Gomez made his European debut, in a 4–2 win over TSG Hoffenheim in the UEFA Champions League play-off. Due to the injury of Nathaniel Clyne, Gomez was the first-choice right-back for the first half of the season; even starting in games against rivals Arsenal and Manchester United; against the former he assisted the first goal in an eventual 4–0 win, and his performance against the latter received praise from fans. In late March 2018, it was confirmed that Gomez would miss the next few games as a result of suffering an injury during an international friendly game. In May 2018, Gomez underwent surgery to his ankle injury, with Liverpool confirming via their official website that Gomez wouldn't play in Liverpool's last fixtures of the season, including the 2018 Champions League final. Gomez made 31 appearances across the season for Liverpool.

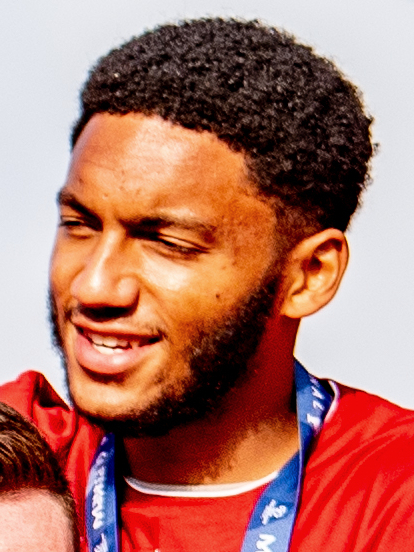
Gomez during the victory parade following Liverpool's win in the 2019 UEFA Champions League final

As a result of the lack of fitness of regular first-team defenders Dejan Lovren and Joël Matip, Gomez was able to establish himself as first-choice centre-back in Liverpool's first games of the season alongside Virgil van Dijk, receiving praise for his performances and receiving the man of the match for his performance in a 2–1 win over Leicester City on 1 September. He continued to feature in defence for the club during the opening half of the season before suffering a fractured leg in December following a challenge by Burnley defender Ben Mee. In February of the following year, he underwent surgery in an attempt to assist his recovery from the injury. Regaining fitness in April, Gomez made a substitute appearance for Liverpool in the 2019 Champions League final, which the club won.

==== 2019–2022 ====
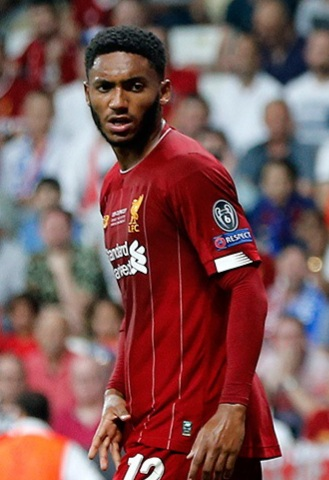
Gomez playing for Liverpool in the 2019 UEFA Super Cup

Gomez began the next season deputising for the in-form Matip, who had become a mainstay alongside van Dijk during Gomez's injury layoff the previous season. Gomez found himself recalled to the starting line-up following injury problems for Matip, and earned praise after a slew of clean sheets in the winter months as Liverpool extended a significant lead at the top of the Premier League table. He was singled out for praise for his leadership and composure during a 1–0 victory over rivals Everton in the FA Cup in January; a match in which Gomez was the only senior player in the back-line after James Milner's early departure.

Gomez suffered a tendon injury to his left knee whilst away on international duty with England and underwent successful surgery on 11 November 2020 to correct the damage. This left Liverpool with an injury crisis at the centre of their defence, following the ACL injury of Gomez' centre-back partner van Dijk. FIFA agreed to pay Liverpool £2 million in compensation to cover Gomez's wages whilst he was injured. In May 2022, Gomez was an unused substitute in the final as Liverpool won the 2021–22 FA Cup. He was also an unused substitute as they lost 1–0 to Real Madrid in the 2022 Champions League final.

==== 2022–present ====
On 7 July 2022, Gomez signed a new five-year contract with the club. On 16 October, Gomez was highly praised for his performance against Manchester City. On 9 November, he captained Liverpool in the penalty shoot-out win against Derby County in the third round of the EFL Cup at Anfield.

On 27 July 2023, following the departure of captain Jordan Henderson to Saudi Pro League club Al-Ettifaq after 12 years at the club, Gomez became the longest serving player at Liverpool. At the beginning of the 2023–24 season, due to the injuries of Trent Alexander-Arnold and Ibrahima Konaté as well as the two-game suspension of Virgil van Dijk, Gomez was a regular starter for Liverpool both at centre-back and full-back.

In December 2024, Gomez revealed that he came close to joining Newcastle United in the summer of that year, but ultimately stayed at Liverpool. In his first season under new manager Arne Slot, he struggled with injury that kept him out for most of the season, but nevertheless Liverpool won the 2024–25 Premier League, earning Gomez his second league title at the club.

== International career ==
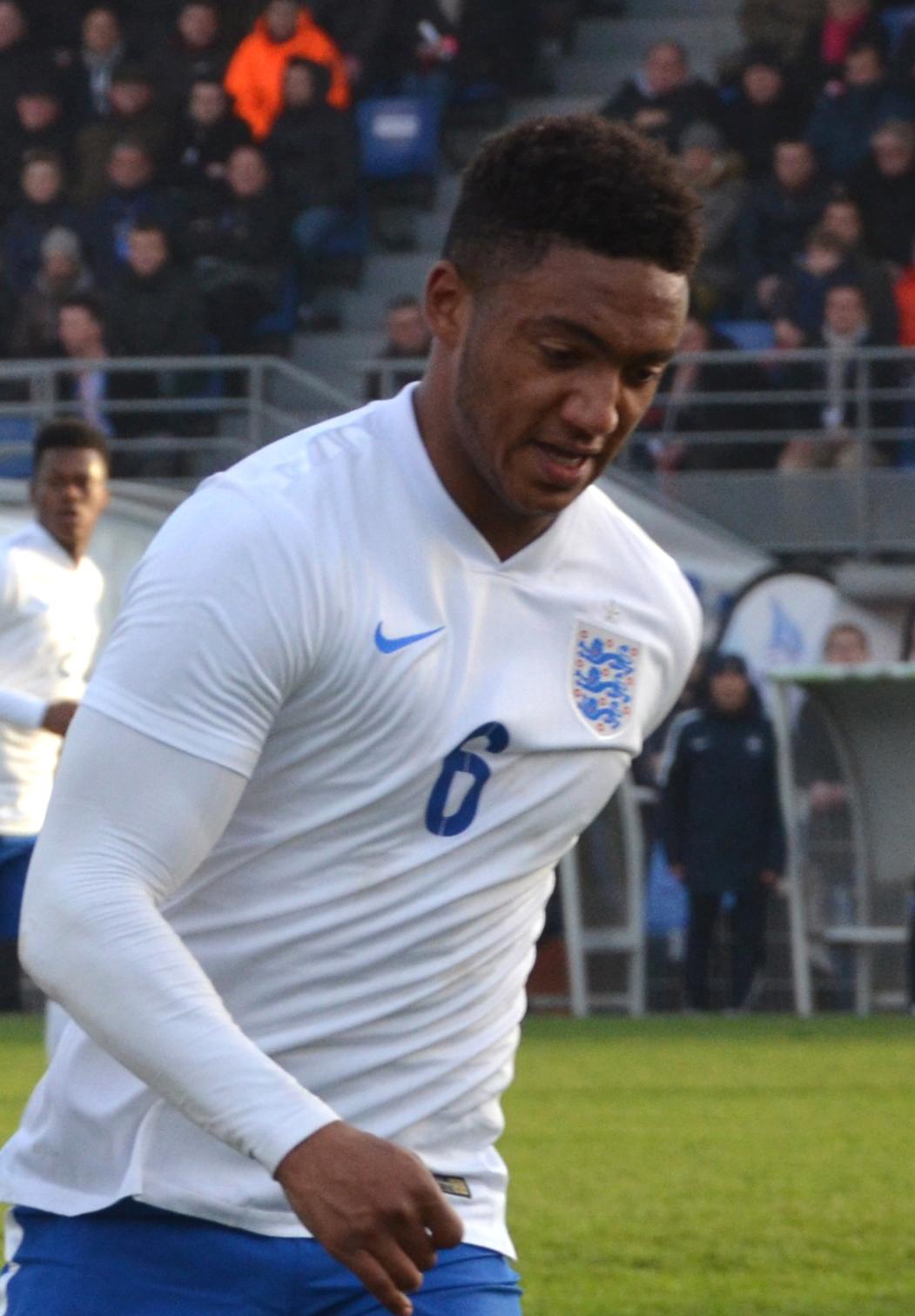
Gomez playing for England U19 in 2015

Gomez was eligible to play for the Gambia through his father but instead chose his birth country, England. He has been capped by England at under-16, under-17 and under-19 levels. In May 2014, he was part of the squad that won the 2014 UEFA European Under-17 Championship in Malta, playing every minute of England's five matches and being named in UEFA's team of the tournament.

On 25 August 2015, he received his first call-up to the under-21 squad. On 30 August 2017, Gomez was announced as England U21 captain ahead of the qualifying campaign for the 2019 UEFA European Under-21 Championship.

He received his first call-up to the England senior squad in November 2017. He made his England debut against Germany at Wembley Stadium in a friendly match, coming on as a substitute to replace Phil Jones in a 0–0 draw. Gomez received a man of the match award in the following game for his performance against Brazil, earning praise for a number of crucial interceptions, and for his ability to nullify the threat of Neymar.

In June 2024, Gomez was named in Gareth Southgate's 26-man England squad for UEFA Euro 2024.

== Style of play ==
Gomez prefers to play as a centre-back but can also play as a full-back on either side. He has been described as a complete footballer and composed ball-playing centre-back with his style of play, being compared to that of former England and Manchester United defender Rio Ferdinand whom he idolised growing up. Gomez is also noted for his athleticism, pace and strength; he is able to produce powerful and dangerous runs up-field on the counter-attack and in defence is rarely physically dominated by an opponent.

== Personal life ==
Gomez met his partner, Tamara, in 2014, on a bus on his way to school. They live together in Cheshire and have a son. His cousin Muhammadu Faal is also a footballer.

== Career statistics ==
=== Club ===
As of match played 22 November 2026

Appearances and goals by club, season and competition
| Club | Season | League | | | FA Cup | | League Cup | | Europe | | Other | | Total | |
| Club | Season | Division | Apps | Goals | Apps | Goals | Apps | Goals | Apps | Goals | Apps | Goals | Apps | Goals |
|---|---|---|---|---|---|---|---|---|---|---|---|---|---|---|
| Charlton Athletic | 2014–15 | Championship | 21 | 0 | 1 | 0 | 2 | 0 | — | | — | | 24 | 0 |
| Liverpool | 2015–16 | Premier League | 5 | 0 | 0 | 0 | 0 | 0 | 2 (Note: Appearances in UEFA Europa League) | 0 | — | | 7 | 0 |
| Liverpool | 2016–17 | Premier League | 0 | 0 | 3 | 0 | 0 | 0 | — | | — | | 3 | 0 |
| Liverpool | 2017–18 | Premier League | 23 | 0 | 1 | 0 | 1 | 0 | 6 (Note: Appearances in UEFA Champions League) | 0 | — | | 31 | 0 |
| Liverpool | 2018–19 | Premier League | 16 | 0 | 0 | 0 | 0 | 0 | 9 | 0 | — | | 25 | 0 |
| Liverpool | 2019–20 | Premier League | 28 | 0 | 2 | 0 | 2 | 0 | 7 | 0 | 4 (Note: One appearance in FA Community Shield, one appearance in UEFA Super Cup, two appearances in FIFA Club World Cup) | 0 | 43 | 0 |
| Liverpool | 2020–21 | Premier League | 7 | 0 | 0 | 0 | 1 | 0 | 3 | 0 | 1 (Note: Appearance in FA Community Shield) | 0 | 12 | 0 |
| Liverpool | 2021–22 | Premier League | 8 | 0 | 2 | 0 | 4 | 0 | 7 | 0 | — | | 21 | 0 |
| Liverpool | 2022–23 | Premier League | 21 | 0 | 3 | 0 | 2 | 0 | 5 | 0 | 0 | 0 | 31 | 0 |
| Liverpool | 2023–24 | Premier League | 32 | 0 | 4 | 0 | 5 | 0 | 10 | 0 | — | | 51 | 0 |
| Liverpool | 2024–25 | Premier League | 9 | 0 | 1 | 0 | 3 | 0 | 4 | 0 | — | | 17 | 0 |
| Liverpool | 2025–26 | Premier League | 21 | 0 | 4 | 0 | 2 | 0 | 6 | 0 | — | | 33 | 0 |
| Liverpool | 2026–27 | Premier League | 4 | 0 | 0 | 0 | 2 | 0 | 3 | 0 | — | | 9 | 0 |
| Liverpool | Total | | 174 | 0 | 20 | 0 | 22 | 0 | 62 | 0 | 5 | 0 | 283 | 0 |
| Career total | | | 195 | 0 | 21 | 0 | 24 | 0 | 62 | 0 | 5 | 0 | 307 | 0 |

=== International ===
Appearances and goals by national team and year
| National team | Year | Apps | Goals |
|---|---|---|---|
| England | 2017 | 2 | 0 |
| England | 2018 | 4 | 0 |
| England | 2019 | 2 | 0 |
| England | 2020 | 3 | 0 |
| England | 2021 | 0 | 0 |
| England | 2022 | 0 | 0 |
| England | 2023 | 0 | 0 |
| England | 2024 | 4 | 0 |
| Total | | 15 | 0 |

== Honours ==
Liverpool

- Premier League: 2019–20, 2024–25
- FA Cup: 2021–22
- EFL Cup: 2023–24
- FA Community Shield: 2022
- UEFA Champions League: 2018–19
- UEFA Super Cup: 2019
- FIFA Club World Cup: 2019

England U17

- UEFA European Under-17 Championship: 2014

England

- UEFA European Championship runner-up: 2024
- UEFA Nations League third place: 2018–19

Individual

- UEFA European Under-17 Championship Team of the Tournament: 2014
