= List of St. John's University alumni =

Notable alumni of St. John's University in New York City include, alphabetically:

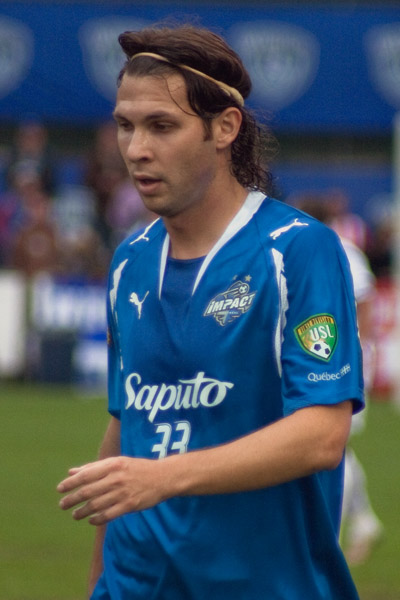
Adam Braz

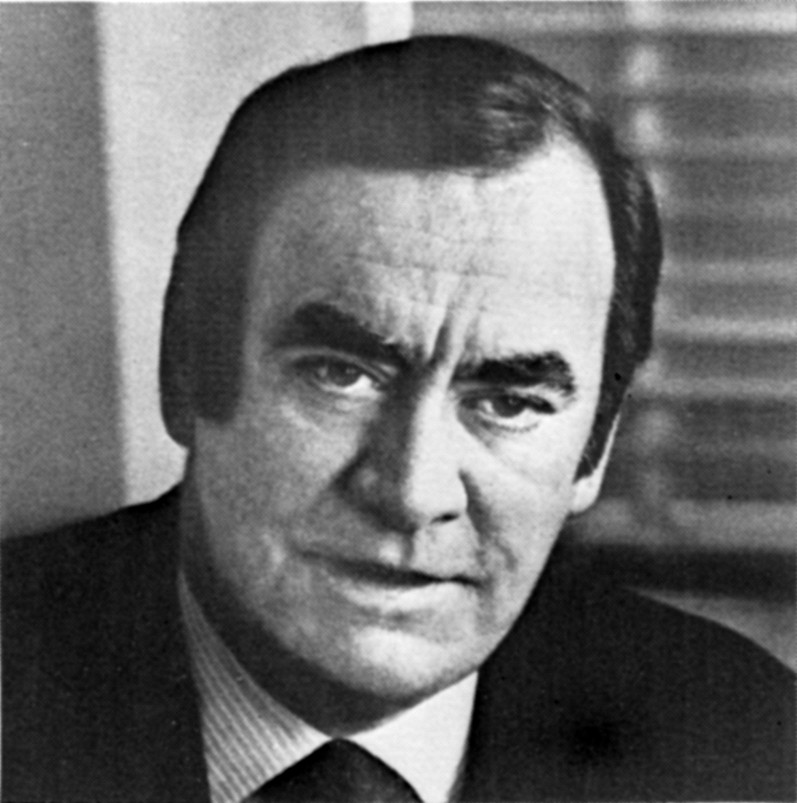
Hugh Carey

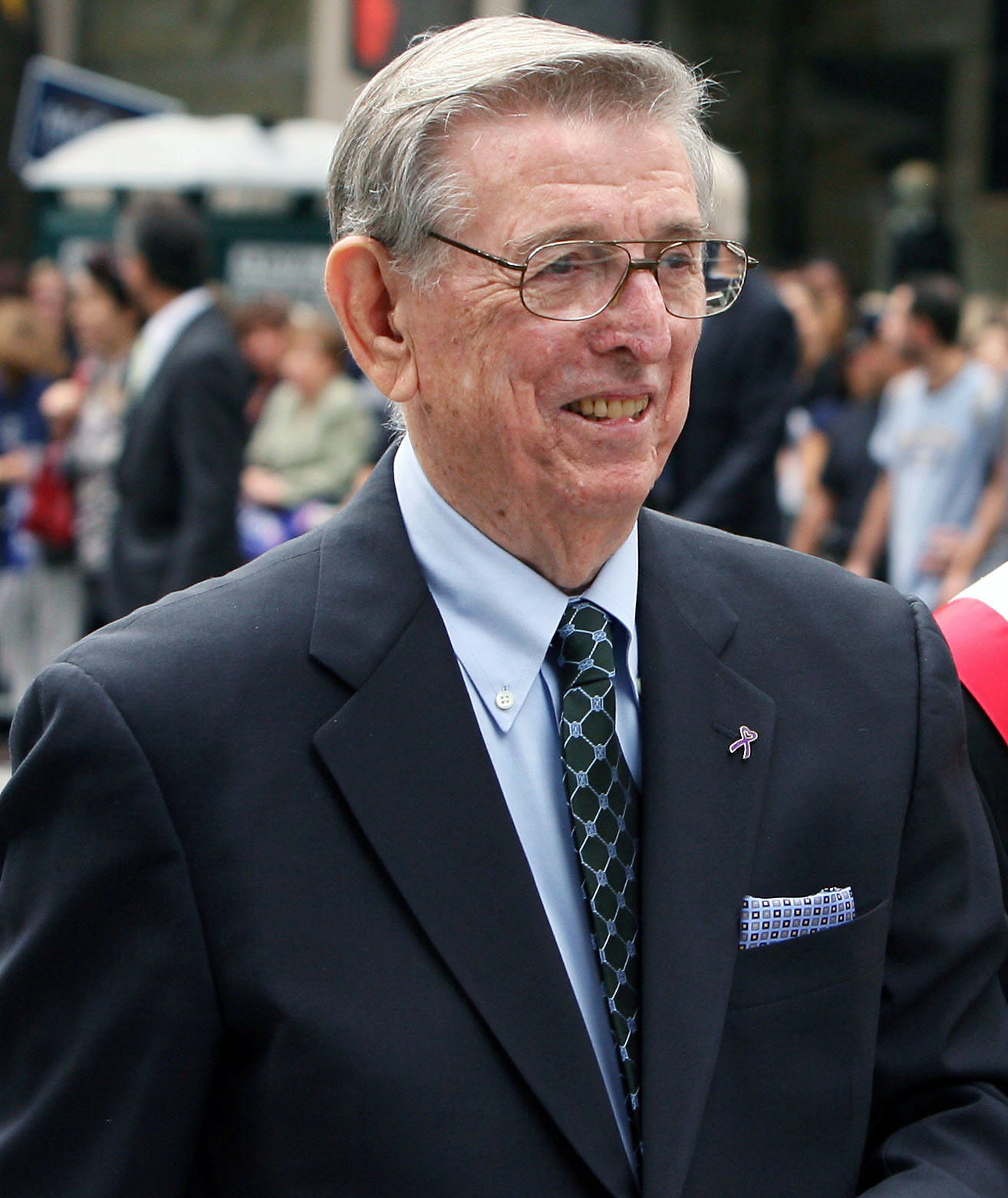
Lou Carnesecca

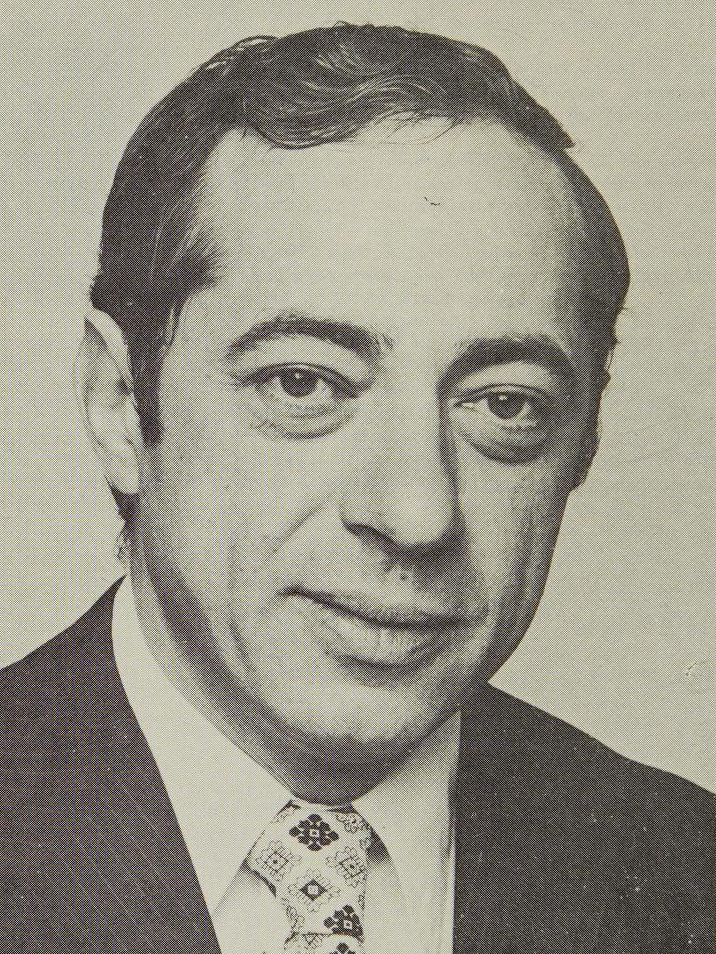
Mario Cuomo

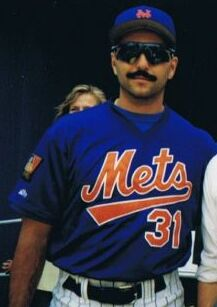
John Franco

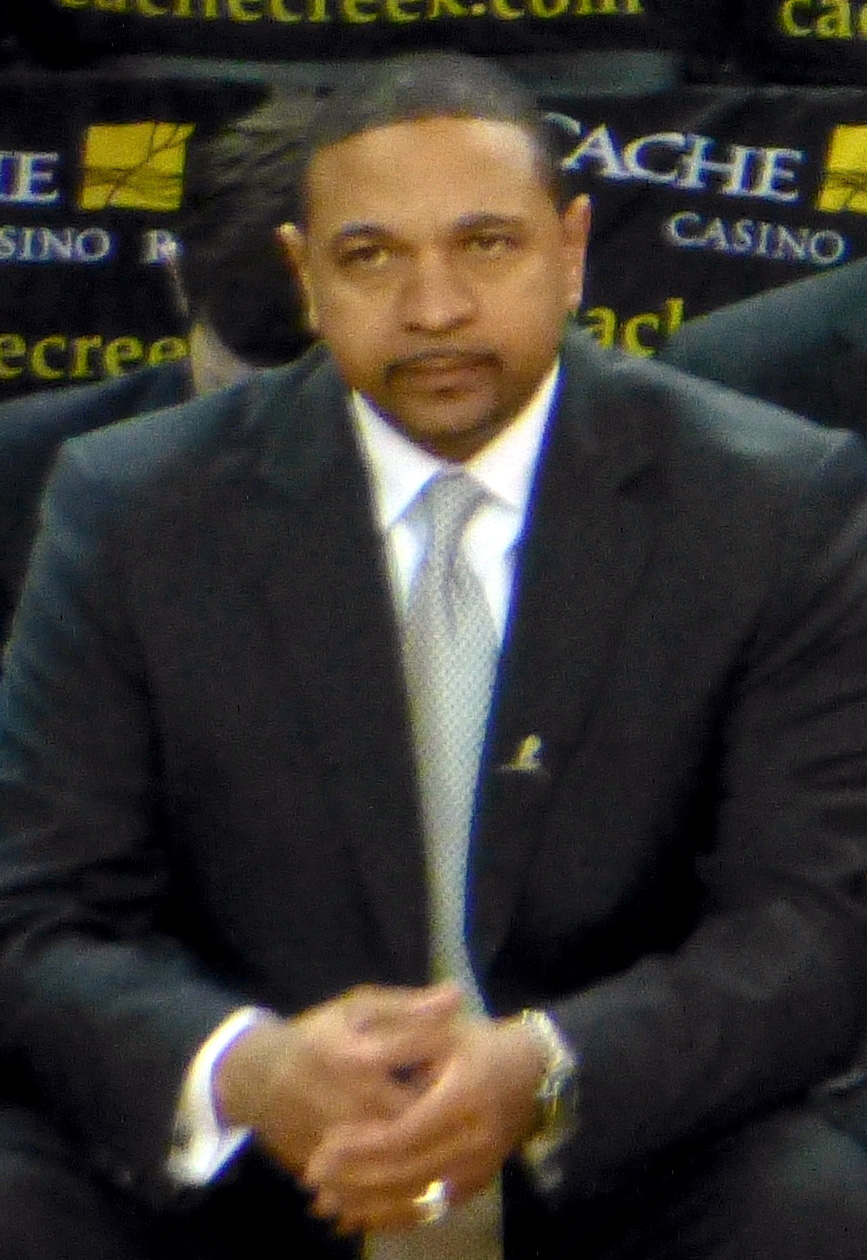
Mark Jackson

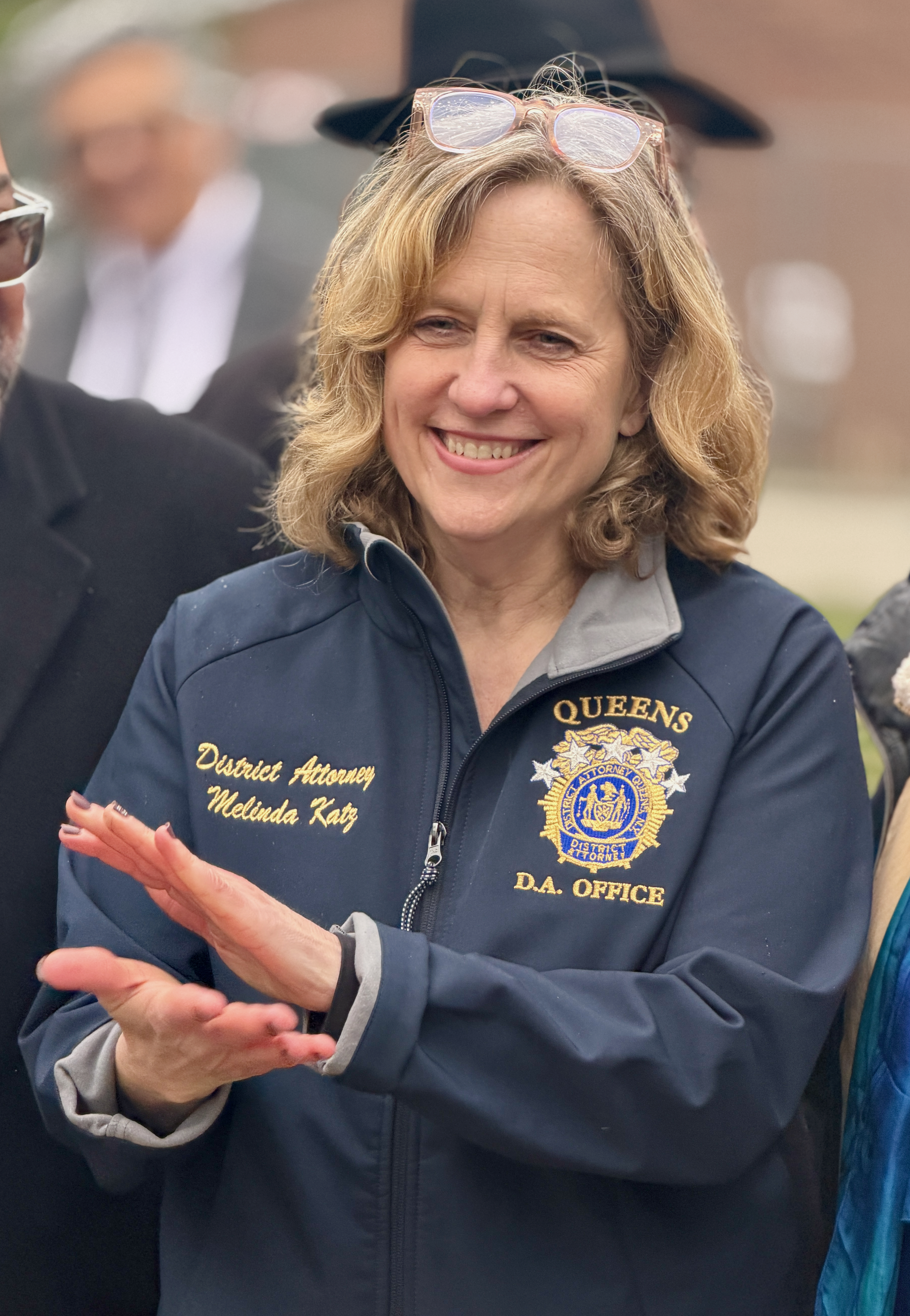
Melinda Katz

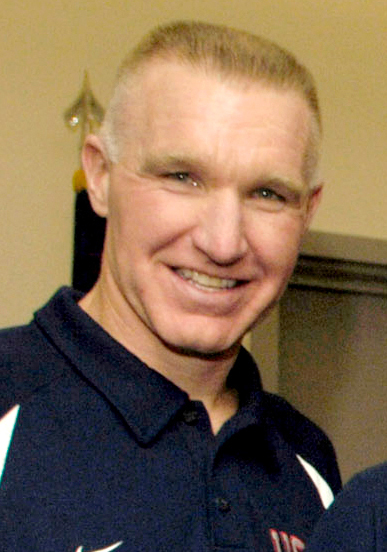
Chris Mullin

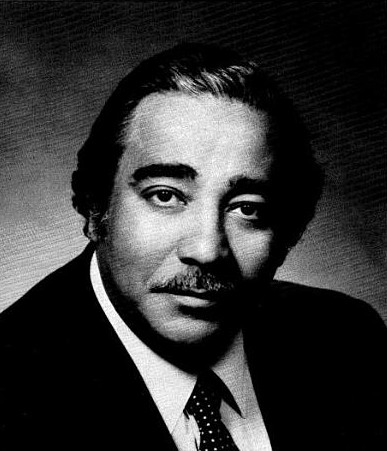
Charlie Rangel

- Peter Abbate (born 1949), member of New York State Assembly
- Joseph P. Addabbo (1925–1986), US Representative from New York (1961–86)
- Joseph Addabbo Jr. (born 1964), New York State Senator and New York City Council member
- Haron Amin (born 1979), Afghan diplomat and spokesman for Northern Alliance after September 11 attacks
- Rich Aurilia (born 1971), Major League Baseball shortstop; All-Star, Silver Slugger Award
- James Baba, Ugandan diplomat, politician, and state minister
- Michael Balboni, NY Deputy Secretary of State for Public Safety, NYS Senator
- Leszek Balcerowicz, MBA (1974), senior government official and architect of the Balcerowicz Plan leading Poland into a market economy
- Russ Banham (born 1954), Pulitzer Prize-nominated journalist and best-selling author
- Morton Bard, psychologist, trailblazer in crisis intervention, author of The Crime Victim's Book
- Erick Barkley, NBA point guard selected in first round of 2000 NBA draft
- Rowan Barrett, basketball player, top scorer in the 2002 Israel Basketball Premier League
- Frank Barsalona, music industry talent agent, non-performer inductee in Rock and Roll Hall of Fame
- Lucas Bartlett, professional soccer player
- Bruce R. Bent, inventor of first money market fund
- Walter Berry (born 1964), NBA basketball power forward; John R. Wooden Award
- Anthony Joseph Bevilacqua (1923–2012), Cardinal and Archbishop of Philadelphia
- Alessandra Biaggi (born 1986), New York State Senator
- Albert H. Bosch, United States House of Representatives
- Leonard Boudin, lawyer and civil rights activist
- Harry Boykoff (1922–2001), NBA basketball center; Consensus first-team All-American
- Keegan Bradley (born 1986), professional golfer, winner of 2011 PGA Championship
- Adam Braz (born 1981), Canadian soccer player and Technical Director of the Montreal Impact of Major League Soccer
- Robert J. Brennan, Bishop of Brooklyn, previously Bishop of Columbus, Ohio, and auxiliary Bishop of Rockville Centre
- Ron Brown, US Secretary of Commerce
- Justin Brownlee, professional basketball forward
- Danny Burawa (born 1988), Major League Baseball pitcher
- Gerald Calabrese, Mayor of Cliffside Park, New Jersey (1965–2015), NBA player with Syracuse Nationals (predecessor to Philadelphia 76ers)
- James P. Campbell, President and CEO of General Electric Consumer and Industrial
- Gerald Cardinale, New Jersey State Senator
- Hugh Carey (1919–2011), Governor of the State of New York and US Representative from Brooklyn
- Gregory W. Carman, United States House of Representatives
- Haggai Carmon, attorney, author of intelligence thrillers, and legal advice columnist
- Lou Carnesecca (1925–2024), Hall of Fame basketball coach, St. John's head coach for 24 seasons
- Tom Carr, Seattle City Attorney and Boulder City Attorney
- William G. Carroll, member of the New York State Assembly
- William J. Casey (1913–1987), Director of Central Intelligence Agency
- Ignatius Anthony Catanello (1938–2013), prelate of the Roman Catholic Church
- Alfred C. Cerullo III, New York City Commissioner and Council Member, professional actor in theater and television
- Carmen Beauchamp Ciparick (born 1942), judge of New York State Court of Appeals
- Frank Cipolla, journalist
- Dane Clark, actor
- Akis Cleanthous (1964–2011), Cypriot Minister of Education and Culture (2007–2008)
- J. Cole, hip-hop recording artist and record producer
- William Colton, member of New York State Assembly
- John Corvino, professor of philosophy at Wayne State University
- Mario Cuomo (1932 –2015), Governor of the State of New York, Lieutenant Governor, and Secretary of State
- Rachel Daly, professional footballer for England women's national football team and the US' NWSL's Houston Dash
- Nickolas Davatzes, former president and CEO of A&E Network
- Mack David (1912–1993), lyricist and songwriter
- Mel Davis, NBA basketball forward
- Raymond J. Dearie, US District Judge, Eastern District of New York
- Malia DelaCruz, musician who performs as CIAO MALZ
- George Deukmejian, Attorney General (1979–1982) and Governor of the State of California (1983–1990)
- Dominick L. DiCarlo, US Assistant Secretary of State for International Narcotics Matters, Chief Judge of the US Court of International Trade
- Janet DiFiore, Chief Judge, New York Court of Appeals
- Patricia DiMango (born 1953), Justice, New York Supreme Court
- Howell Emanuel Donaldson III, basketball player and famously known as the Seminole Heights serial killer.
- Richard Donoghue, US Attorney for the Eastern District of New York
- Tom J. Donohue, President and CEO of United States Chamber of Commerce
- Dan Donovan, United States House of Representatives, New York's 11th congressional district
- John Francis Dooling Jr., US District Judge, Eastern District of New York
- Conrad B. Duberstein (1915–2005), Chief Judge of the U.S. Bankruptcy Court for the Eastern District of New York
- Clarence Dunnaville, lawyer and civil rights activist
- George Dzundza, actor
- Randall T. Eng (born 1947), Presiding Justice, New York Supreme Court, Appellate Division
- John Louis Esposito, historian and orientalist
- Clare Farragher (born 1941), member of New Jersey General Assembly (1988–2002)
- Alexander A. Farrelly, Governor of US Virgin Islands
- L. J. Figueroa (born 1998), Dominican-American basketball player in the Israeli Basketball Premier League
- Patricia Fili-Krushel, senior executive at NBC Universal News Group, Time Warner, WebMD, ABC Television Network
- Mickey Fisher (1904/05–1963), basketball coach
- Joseph C. H. Flynn (1892–1941), lawyer, politician, and magistrate
- Gardner Fox, comic book writer, creator of original Justice Society, The Flash; novelist
- Mike Francesa, radio personality, "The Sports Pope"
- John Franco, Major League baseball pitcher, captain for New York Mets; 4× All-Star, 3× NL saves leader
- Dan Frisa, United States House of Representatives
- Jack Garfinkel (1918–2013), Boston Celtics basketball guard
- Bill Gaudette, MLS professional soccer player
- Nelson George, author, columnist, filmmaker, music and culture critic, and journalist
- John J. Ghezzi, NYS Secretary of State
- Patricia Reilly Giff, author of children's books
- Jacob H. Gilbert (1920–1981), US Representative from New York between 1960 and 1971
- John Girgenti, New Jersey State Senator
- Hy Gotkin (1922–2004), basketball player, member of the New York City Basketball Hall of Fame
- Matt Groenwald (born 1983), MLS professional soccer player
- Frank Gulotta, Nassau County District Attorney and NYS Appellate Division judge
- Dan Halloran, New York City Council member
- Zendon Hamilton, professional basketball player
- Craig Hansen, MLB professional baseball pitcher
- Maurice Harkless, NBA player for Portland Trail Blazers
- Marcus Hatten (born 1980), basketball point guard, 2006 top scorer in the Israeli Basketball Premier League
- Joseph A. Healey, US Army major general
- Richard Garth Henning, Archbishop of Boston
- Darryl Hill, basketball player known as "Showtime Hill"
- Lester Holtzman, US Congressman and NY judge
- Daryl Homer (born 1990), Olympic saber fencer
- George Hu, Taiwanese-American actor
- Charles Hynes, District Attorney of Kings County (Brooklyn)
- Race Imboden (born 1993), Olympic foil fencer for team USA
- Mark Jackson (born 1965), NBA basketball player; NCAA assists leader, NBA Rookie of the Year, NBA All-Star, NBA assists leader.
- Harold M. Jacobs (1912–1995), Jewish and civic leader
- Mark Jacoby (born 1947), Broadway actor
- Jaheim, R&B singer
- Theodore T. Jones Jr., Judge, New York Court of Appeals
- Shalrie Joseph, Grenadian MLS professional soccer player
- Agim Kaba, Albanian-American actor, artist
- Alex Katz (born 1994), American-Israeli baseball pitcher and Team Israel Olympian
- Melinda Katz (born 1965), Queens Borough President, Queens District Attorney
- Margaret M. Keane, Chief Executive Officer and President of Synchrony Financial
- Raymond W. Kelly, Commissioner of New York City Police Department
- D. J. Kennedy (born 1989), NBA basketball player
- John M. Kennedy Jr., politician from Suffolk County, New York
- Brian Kenny, ESPN sportscaster
- Lawrence Korb, US Assistant Secretary of Defense (1981–85)
- Boris Kostelanetz (1911–2006), tax lawyer
- John Kresse, NCAA men's basketball coach at College of Charleston
- Andrew Lanza, New York State Senator
- Henry J. Latham, United States House of Representatives
- Peter Le Jacq Maryknoll priest
- Ivan Lee (born 1981), Olympic saber fencer; later banned for life from Olympic sports
- Raymond Lesniak, New Jersey State Senator
- Andrew Levane (1920– 2012), NBA basketball player
- Stanley David Levison, lawyer, activist and advisor to Rev. Dr. Martin Luther King Jr.
- Steve Levy, 7th County Executive of Suffolk County
- Mark LoMonaco, professional wrestler
- Allen Lowe, composer, musician, music historian, and sound restoration specialist
- Annet Mahendru (born 1985), actress
- Patrick A. Malone, Chief Supervisory Officer of Garden State Securities Inc.
- Guy James Mangano (1930-2025), Presiding Justice of New York Supreme Court, Appellate Division
- Thomas J. Manton, US Congressman and Chair of Queens County Democratic Organization
- John J. Marchi (1921–2009), New York State Senator (1957–2007)
- Mariah the Scientist (born Mariah Amani Buckles, 1997), singer-songwriter
- Jack Martins, NYS Senator
- John McCormac, Mayor of Woodbridge Township, New Jersey
- Darryl "D.M.C." McDaniels, co-founder of hip-hop group Run-D.M.C.
- Curtis McDowald (born 1996), fencer
- Al McGuire, NCAA basketball coach and television commentator
- Ed McGuire, assistant general manager and Executive VP of Football Operations San Diego Chargers
- Frank McGuire, NCAA basketball coach at St. John's, North and South Carolina and NBA coach for Philadelphia Warriors
- Brian McNamee, MLB conditioning coach
- Stefani Miglioranzi, soccer player for Los Angeles Galaxy, played in England for Swindon Town
- Charles Minlend, professional basketball forward, 2003 Israeli Basketball Premier League MVP
- Michael Montesano, member of New York State Assembly
- Chris Mullin (born 1963), NBA player, Hall of Famer, head coach of St. John's Red Storm; John R. Wooden Award, Consensus first-team All-American, 5× NBA All-Star
- Ari Nagel (born 1975/1976), mathematics professor and sperm donor
- Sam Nahem (1915–2004), Major League Baseball pitcher
- Lou Niles, radio host of 91X and executive director of Oceanside International Film Festival
- Kate O'Beirne, journalist, political commentator, magazine editor
- Paul O'Dwyer, President of the New York City Council (1974–77)
- Diarmuid F. O'Scannlain, Judge, US Court of Appeals for the Ninth Circuit
- Joe Panik, professional baseball player for San Francisco Giants; All Star, Gold Glove Award
- Joshua Parens, Professor of Philosophy at the University of Dallas
- Basil Paterson, New York Secretary of State, NY State Senator, attorney
- Edmund D. Pellegrino, 11th President of The Catholic University of America
- James Pitaro, President of ESPN and Co-Chair, Disney Media Networks
- Harvey Pitt (1945-2023), 26th Chairman of US Securities and Exchange Commission (2001–03)
- Richie Powers, NBA referee (1956–79)
- Charles B. Rangel, US Representative of Manhattan
- Lewis Ranieri, former bond trader and "father" of mortgage-backed securities
- Steve Ratzer (born 1953), Major League Baseball pitcher
- Edward D. Re, Chief Judge of US Court of International Trade and US Assistant Secretary of State for Educational and Cultural Affairs
- Mike Repole, Co-Founder of Glaceau, BODYARMOR SuperDrink and Repole Stables
- Victor Ricciardi, professor of business
- Wayne Rosenthal (born 1965), Major League Baseball pitcher and coach
- Howard J. Rubenstein (1932–2020), lawyer and public relations expert
- Christopher Ruddy (born 1965), CEO of Newsmax Media
- Mickey Rutner (1919-2007), Major League Baseball third baseman
- Luke Sabis, musician, film director and actor
- Brent Sancho, MLS professional soccer player
- Metta Sandiford-Artest (born 1979), NBA basketball player formerly known as Metta World Peace and Ron Artest
- John J. Santucci, District Attorney of Queens
- Diane Savino, New York State Senator
- Eli Schenkel (born 1992), Canadian Olympic foil fencer
- James J. Schiro (1946–2014), CEO of PriceWaterhouseCoopers and Zurich Financial Services
- Ian Schrager, hotelier and real estate developer
- Howie Schwab, eponymous star of ESPN's show Stump the Schwab
- Malik Sealy, NBA basketball player
- Joanna Seybert (born 1946), US District Judge, Eastern District of New York
- Sidney Shapiro (1915–2014), American-born Chinese translator, actor and author
- Bob Sheppard, announcer for New York Yankees, "Voice of the Yankees"
- David D. Siegel, law professor, legal scholar and commentator
- Ron Silver (1946–2009), Tony Award for Best Actor-winning actor
- Justin Simon (born 1996), basketball player for Bnei Herzliya of the Israeli Basketball Premier League
- Keeth Smart (born 1978), Olympic team silver medalist saber fencer, first US fencer to reach #1 world ranking
- Kathryn Smith, first full-time female National Football League coach
- Taryn Delanie Smith, Miss New York 2022
- Samuel A. Spiegel (1914–1977), lawyer, politician, and judge
- John E. Sprizzo, US District Judge, Southern District of New York
- Elliot Steinmetz (born 1980), real estate lawyer and basketball coach
- Stuart Sternberg, financier and principal shareholder and Managing General Partner of the Tampa Bay Rays baseball team
- Elaine Weddington Steward, lawyer working for Major League Baseball
- Norman Sturner (born 1940), real estate developer
- Bruce Sudano, singer-songwriter, record producer and music arranger
- Kevin J. Sweeney, Bishop of Paterson, New Jersey
- Stephen Tan, business administration, Hong Kong business executive and family controlled Asia Financial Group
- Tan Xiangdong, also known as Adam Tan, Chinese-American co-founder of Hainan Airlines and former CEO of HNA Group
- Fred Thompson (1933–2019), Hall of Fame track and field coach
- Matthew Titone, member of New York State Assembly
- Michael Tucci, actor
- Bob Turner, US Representative for the 9th Congressional District of New York (2011–2013)
- Martin Tytell (1913–2008), expert in manual typewriters
- Larry Valencia, Rhode Island State Representative
- Daphne Valerius, filmmaker
- Paul Vallone, New York City Council member
- Jimmy Van Bramer, New York City Council member
- Anthony Varvaro (1984–2022), MLB pitcher and Port Authority police officer
- Guy Velella (R), New York State Senator indicted for bribery and conspiracy; pleaded guilty to one count in a plea bargain and received a year in jail, but served 182 days.
- Richard Vetere, playwright and screenwriter
- Karina Vetrano, murder victim
- Frank Viola, Major League baseball pitcher; AL Cy Young Award, 3× All-Star, MLB wins leader
- Sal Vulcano, comedian, Impractical Jokers
- Cora Walker, one of the first black women to practice law in New York
- Bill Wennington, NBA basketball player
- Aaron Wheeler (born 1998), basketball forward in the Israeli Basketball Premier League
- Jayson Williams, NBA basketball player and author; NBA All-Star
- Kevin Williams (basketball), retired NBA basketball guard
- Chris Wingert, MLS professional soccer player
- Terence Winter, writer, TV, and film producer, creator of HBO series Boardwalk Empire
- Red Wolfe, basketball player and coach
- Dagmara Wozniak (born 1988), Olympic saber fencer, Olympic team bronze medal
- Emanuel Xavier (born 1970), poet and LGBTQ+ activist
- Max Zaslofsky (1925–1985), NBA guard/forward, All-Star, scoring champion, ABA coach

== Fictional ==
- Ray Barone, title character of TV series Everybody Loves Raymond
- Shawn Stark, a main character of TV series Power, who fictionally played for St. John's Basketball
