= Cassandra Johnson =

Cassandra Johnson may refer to:

- Cassandra Potter, née Johnson, American curler
- Cassandra Johnson (judge), American attorney and judge
