= Patrick Malone =

Patrick Malone may refer to:

- Patrick A. Malone (born 1951), Washington D.C.–based trial attorney
- Patrick Malone (Irish politician) (1916–1993), Irish Fine Gael politician
- Pat Malone (hurler) (born 1965), retired Irish hurler
- Patrick Malone (British politician) (1857–1939), British Member of Parliament for Tottenham South, 1918–1923 and 1924–1929
- Matches Malone (Patrick Malone), a character from the television series Gotham
