= John M. Kennedy Jr. =

American politician

John M. Kennedy
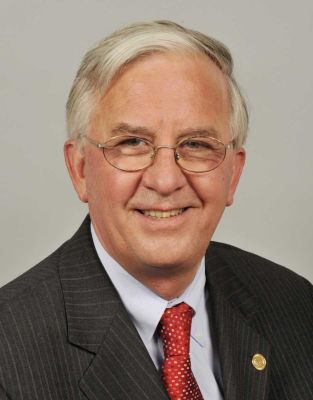

Suffolk County Comptroller
- Incumbent
- Assumed office January 2015
- Preceded by: Joseph Sawicki Jr.

Member of the Suffolk County Legislature from the 12th District
- In office November 2004 – December 2014
- Preceded by: Andrew Crecca
- Succeeded by: Leslie Kennedy

Minority Leader for the Suffolk County Legislature
- In office January 2012 – December 2014
- Preceded by: Daniel P. Losquadro
- Succeeded by: Kevin McCaffrey

Personal details
- Party: Republican
- Education: SUNY, Stony Brook University (B.A.); Adelphi University (M.B.A); St. John's University School of Law (J.D.)
- Profession: Lawyer
- Website: Suffolk County Legislature

John M. Kennedy Jr. is a politician from Suffolk County, New York. In 2014, he was elected to Suffolk County Comptroller on the Republican ticket, garnering 53% of the vote.

He served as County Legislator for the 12th Legislative District of Suffolk County, New York, for 10 years. In 2011, he was chosen from among the Republican Caucus in Suffolk to serve as Minority Leader for the Suffolk County Legislature, serving until his term ended in December 2014.

== Education and background ==
John M. Kennedy Jr. was born and raised in Suffolk County, and is a long-term resident of Nesconset, New York. Kennedy received his B.A. in psychology with a concentration in Biology from SUNY Stony Brook in 1979. He also attended Adelphi University where he received his MBA and additionally has a Juris Doctor from St. John's University School of Law. He is married with four adult children.

== Electoral history ==
In November 2004 Kennedy was first elected as County Legislator, receiving 60% of the vote running on the Republican Party, Independence Party, Conservative and Working Families tickets. In 2011, Kennedy received 73.66% of the vote against his Democratic opponent, Martin Aponte, who received 26.31%.

In November, 2014 Kennedy beat Democrat James Gaughran in the election for Suffolk County Comptroller, despite being outspent $800,000 to $100,000.

== See also ==
- List of St. John's University alumni
- Suffolk County Legislature
