= Joe Mooney =

Joe or Joseph Mooney may refer to:

- John Mooney (Irish politician) (1874–1934), Irish nationalist politician
- Joseph Mooney (footballer) (fl. 1900s), English football player
- Joe Mooney (musician) (1911–1975), American jazz and pop accordionist
- Joe Mooney (politician) (1916–1988), Irish Fianna Fáil politician from County Leitrim
- Joseph Fraser Mooney (1927–2006), Canadian politician
- Joe Mooney (groundskeeper) (born 1930), American former groundskeeper for the Boston Red Sox
- Joseph Mooney (New Zealand politician) (born 1979)

== See also ==
- Mooney
