= Boston Red Sox Hall of Fame =

- Sport: Baseball
- League: Major League Baseball
- Awarded for: Recognition of the outstanding careers of selected former Boston Red Sox players, coaches, managers, and non-uniformed personnel
- Presented by: Boston Red Sox Hall of Fame Selection Committee

History
- First award: 1995 (31 years ago)
- Website: www.mlb.com/redsox/history/red-sox-hall-of-fame

The Boston Red Sox Hall of Fame was instituted in 1995 to recognize the careers of selected former Boston Red Sox players, coaches and managers, and non-uniformed personnel. A 15-member selection committee of Red Sox broadcasters and executives, past and present media personnel, and representatives from The Sports Museum of New England and the BoSox Club (Note: The BoSox Club, established in 1967, is the official booster club of the Boston Red Sox.) are responsible for nominating candidates.

== Criteria ==
The criteria for selection into the Hall is as follows:

- Player to be eligible for nomination must have played a minimum of three years with the Boston Red Sox and must also have been out of uniform as an active player a minimum of three years.
- Non-uniformed honorees such as broadcasters and front office execs are inducted by a unanimous vote of the Boston Red Sox Hall of Fame selection committee. The memorable moment will be chosen by the committee as well.
- Former Boston Red Sox players and personnel in the National Baseball Hall of Fame in Cooperstown, New York, will be automatically enshrined in the Boston Red Sox Hall of Fame.

== Inductees ==
The following 16 people were included as charter members of the Boston Red Sox Hall of Fame, by virtue of prior induction to the National Baseball Hall of Fame:

- Eddie Collins (front office)
- Jimmy Collins
- Joe Cronin
- Bobby Doerr
- Rick Ferrell
- Jimmie Foxx
- Lefty Grove
- Harry Hooper
- Herb Pennock
- Red Ruffing
- Babe Ruth
- Tris Speaker
- Ted Williams
- Carl Yastrzemski
- Tom Yawkey (longtime owner)
- Cy Young

Induction ceremonies for additional honorees were held on:

- November 1, 1995
- September 8, 1997
- May 18, 2000
- November 14, 2002
- November 10, 2004
- November 9, 2006
- November 7, 2008
- September 17, 2010
- August 3, 2012
- August 14, 2014
- May 19, 2016
- May 24, 2018
- May 26, 2022
- May 29, 2024
- TBA, 2026

Key
Class	Year of announcement / induction
**Bold**	Member of the Baseball Hall of Fame
†	Member of the Baseball Hall of Fame as a Red Sox
**Bold**	Recipient of the Hall of Fame's Ford C. Frick Award

Members of the Boston Red Sox Hall of Fame
Class	Uniform no.	Name	Position(s)	Tenure
Charter	—N/a	**Eddie Collins**; Formally inducted in 2006	General manager	1933–1947
Charter	—	**Jimmy Collins**^{†} Formally inducted in 2004	3B; Manager	1901–1907; 1901–1906
Charter	4, 6	**Joe Cronin**^{†}	SS; Manager	1935–1945; 1935–1947
Charter	1, 9	**Bobby Doerr**^{†}	2B	1937–1944, 1946–1951
Charter	2, 7, 9	**Rick Ferrell**^{†}	C	1933–1937
Charter	3	**Jimmie Foxx**^{†} Formally inducted in 1997	1B	1936–1942
Charter	10	**Lefty Grove**^{†}	P	1934–1941
Charter	—	**Harry Hooper**^{†} Formally inducted in 1997	RF	1909–1920
Charter	17	**Herb Pennock**^{†}	P	1915–1917, 1919–1922, 1934
Charter	—	**Red Ruffing**	P	1924–1930
Charter	—	**Babe Ruth**	OF/P	1914–1919
Charter	—	**Tris Speaker**; Formally inducted in 2000	CF	1907–1915
Charter	9	**Ted Williams**^{†}	LF	1939–1942, 1946–1960
Charter	8	**Carl Yastrzemski**^{†}	LF/1B	1961–1983
Charter	—N/a	**Tom Yawkey**^{†}	Owner	1933–1976
Charter	—	**Cy Young**; Formally inducted in 1997	P Manager	1901–1908; 1907
1995	25	Tony Conigliaro	RF	1964–1967, 1969–1970, 1975
1995	7	Dom DiMaggio	CF	1940–1942, 1946–1953
1995	11, 43	Frank Malzone	3B	1955–1965
1995	6	Johnny Pesky	SS/3B; Manager	1942, 1946–1952; 1963–1964, 1980
1995	14	**Jim Rice**^{†}	LF/DH	1974–1989
1995	—	Smoky Joe Wood	P/OF	1908–1915
1995	—N/a	Jean R. Yawkey	Owner	1976–1992
1997	27, 40	**Carlton Fisk**^{†}	C	1969, 1971–1980
1997	—N/a	Dick O'Connell	Executive	1961–1977
1997	17	Mel Parnell	P	1947–1956
1997	6, 38	Rico Petrocelli	SS/3B	1963, 1965–1976
1997	17	Dick Radatz	P	1962–1966
1997	23	Luis Tiant	P	1971–1978
2000	—N/a	Ken Coleman	Broadcaster	1965–1974, 1979–1989
2000	24, 40	Dwight Evans	RF	1972–1990
2000	—	Larry Gardner	3B	1908–1917
2000	—N/a	**Curt Gowdy**	Broadcaster	1951–1965
2000	4, 30	Jackie Jensen	RF	1954–1959, 1961
2000	—N/a	Ned Martin	Broadcaster	1961–1992
2000	27	Bill Monbouquette	P	1958–1965
2000	7, 41	Reggie Smith	RF/CF	1966–1973
2000	46	Bob Stanley	P	1977–1989
2002	7	Rick Burleson	SS	1974–1980
2002	33, 38	Dave Ferriss	P	1945–1950
2002	—N/a	Lou Gorman	General manager	1984–1993
2002	—N/a	John Harrington	CEO	1992–1999
2002	15, 21, 29	Tex Hughson	P	1941–1944, 1946–1949
2002	—	Duffy Lewis	LF	1910–1917
2002	16	Jim Lonborg	P	1965–1971
2002	19	Fred Lynn	CF	1974–1980
2004	26	**Wade Boggs**^{†}	3B	1982–1992
2004	—	Bill Carrigan	C Manager	1906, 1908–1916; 1913–1916, 1927–1929
2004	43	**Dennis Eckersley**	P	1978–1984, 1998
2004	10, 28	Billy Goodman	IF	1947–1957
2004	47	Bruce Hurst	P	1980–1988
2004	—N/a	Ben Mondor	Pawtucket Red Sox owner	1977–2010
2004	3	Pete Runnels	IF; Manager	1958–1962; 1966
2004	16, 30, 41	Haywood Sullivan	C General partner	1955, 1957, 1959–1960; 1978–1993
2006	—N/a	Dick Bresciani	Executive	1972–2014
2006	16	Ellis Kinder	P	1948–1955
2006	35	Joe Morgan	Coach; Manager	1985–1988; 1988–1991
2006	2	Jerry Remy	2B; Broadcaster	1978–1984; 1988–2021
2006	5, 15, 39	George Scott	1B	1966–1971, 1977–1979
2006	5	Vern Stephens	SS	1948–1952
2006	16	**Dick Williams**	OF/3B; Manager	1963–1964; 1967–1969
2008	—N/a	George Digby	Scout	1944–2009
2008	12	Wes Ferrell	P	1934–1937
2008	37, 39	Mike Greenwell	LF	1985–1996
2008	—N/a	Edward F. Kenney Sr.	Executive	1948–1991
2008	37	Bill Lee	P	1969–1978
2008	—	Everett Scott	SS	1914–1921
2008	18, 30	Frank Sullivan	P	1953–1960
2008	42	Mo Vaughn	1B	1991–1998
2010	4	Tommy Harper	OF/3B	1972–1974
2010	2, 12	Eddie Kasko	SS/3B; Manager	1966; 1970–1973
2010	2, 24, 26, 34, 37	Jimmy Piersall	CF	1950, 1952–1958
2010	13	John Valentin	SS/3B	1992–2001
2010	23, 34	Don Zimmer	Coach; Manager	1974–1976, 1992; 1976–1980
2012	17	Marty Barrett	2B	1982–1990
2012	12, 25	Ellis Burks	OF	1987–1992, 2004
2012	15, 17, 19, 32	Joe Dobson	P	1941–1943, 1946–1950, 1954
2012	—	Dutch Leonard	P	1913–1918
2012	—N/a	Joe Mooney	Groundskeeper	1971–2000
2012	38	Curt Schilling	P	2004–2007
2012	—N/a	John I. Taylor	Owner	1904–1911
2014	—N/a	**Joe Castiglione**	Broadcaster	1983–2024
2014	21	Roger Clemens	P	1984–1996
2014	5	Nomar Garciaparra	SS	1996–2004
2014	45	**Pedro Martínez**^{†}	P	1998–2004
2016	—	Ira Flagstead	OF	1923–1929
2016	—N/a	Larry Lucchino	Executive	2001–2015
2016	33, 47	Jason Varitek	C	1997–2011
2016	49	Tim Wakefield	P	1995–2011
2018	—N/a	Arthur D'Angelo	Special achievement (Note: Arthur D'Angelo was co-founder of The Souvenir Store on Jersey Street and '47 brand.)	n/a
2018	—	Buck Freeman	RF	1901–1907
2018	—N/a	Al Green	Fenway Park guest relations	1973–2018
2018	32, 43	Derek Lowe	P	1997–2004
2018	25	Mike Lowell	3B	2006–2010
2018	20	Kevin Youkilis	1B/3B	2004–2012
2020	—	Bill Dinneen	P	1902–1907
2020	—N/a	Dan Duquette	General manager	1994–2002
2020	10	Rich Gedman	C	1980–1990
2020	34	**David Ortiz**^{†}	DH	2003–2016
2020	24	Manny Ramirez	LF	2001–2008
2024	7	Trot Nixon	RF	1996, 1998–2006
2024	58	Jonathan Papelbon	RP	2005–2011
2024	15	Dustin Pedroia	2B	2006–2019
2024	—N/a	Elaine Weddington Steward	Front office	1988–present
2026	18	Johnny Damon	CF	2002–2005
2026	62, 31	Jon Lester	SP	2006–2014
2026	50	Mike Timlin	RP	2003–2008
2026	—N/a	Sherm Feller	Public address announcer	1967–1993

Note: the uniform number column is not applicable for inductees in non-uniformed roles; no number is listed for uniformed personnel who were with the Red Sox prior to the introduction of uniform numbers (1931). Uniformed personnel are players, coaches, and managers.

=== Moments ===
Each class of inductees has also included a memorable moment in Red Sox history:

Key
Class	Year of announcement
Date	When the noted game was played
Box	Link to a box score for the noted game
SABR	Link to an article about the game from the Society for American Baseball Research (SABR)

Class	Date	Name	Opponent	"Moment" description	Box	SABR
1995	April 29, 1986	Roger Clemens	Seattle Mariners	First 20-strikeout performance		
1997	October 21, 1975	Carlton Fisk	Cincinnati Reds	Walk-off home run in bottom of the 12th to win Game 6 of 1975 World Series		
2000	October 12, 1986	Dave Henderson	California Angels	Top of the 9th home run to take the lead, and top of the 11th sacrifice fly that drove in the winning run, in Game 5 of the 1986 ALCS		
2002	June 26, 1962	Earl Wilson	Los Angeles Angels	No-hitter		
2004	October 21, 1975	Bernie Carbo	Cincinnati Reds	Game-tying three-run home run in 8th inning of Game 6 of 1975 World Series		
2006	October 17, 2004	Dave Roberts	New York Yankees	Bottom of the 9th pinch-run stolen base to start rally in Game 4 of 2004 ALCS		
2008	September 28, 1960	Ted Williams	Baltimore Orioles	Home run in final major-league at bat		
2008	October 19, 2004	Curt Schilling	New York Yankees	"Bloody sock" performance in Game 6 of 2004 ALCS		
2010	October 3, 1990	Tom Brunansky	Chicago White Sox	Game-winning catch in American League East division clinching win		
2012	October 1, 1967	1967 Red Sox	Minnesota Twins	"Impossible Dream" season's pennant-clinching victory		
2014	September 10, 1999	Pedro Martínez	New York Yankees	One-hit, 17-strikeout winning performance		
2016	October 13, 2013	David Ortiz	Detroit Tigers	Grand slam in bottom of the 8th to tie Game 2 of 2013 ALCS		
2018	July 21, 1959	Pumpsie Green	Chicago White Sox	Debuts as the first African-American player for the Red Sox		
2020	October 27, 2004	2004 Red Sox	St. Louis Cardinals	2004 World Series clinching win in Game 4		
2024	April 14, 1967	Billy Rohr	New York Yankees	One-hitter and near no-hitter in first career start		
2026	July 24, 2004	Bill Mueller	New York Yankees	Walk-off home run off Mariano Rivera		

== See also ==
- List of Boston Red Sox awards
- Ted Williams Museum
