= Cassandra Johnson (judge) =

American politician

Justice of the New York State Supreme Court from the 11th Judicial district
- Incumbent
- Assumed office January 1, 2024

Justice of the New York City Civil Court from the Queens County 4th municipal court district
- In office January 1, 2022 – December 31, 2023

Personal details
- Born: Queens,
- Party: Democrat
- Education: St. John's University School of Law
- Occupation: Attorney, Judge

Cassandra A. Johnson is an American attorney and judge. A Democrat, she served as a Housing Court judge and court employee before being elected to the New York City Civil Court and the New York Supreme Court.

== Early life and career ==
Johnson was born in Far Rockaway. She graduated from St. John's University School of Law in 2006. She was admitted to the New York State Bar in 2007 and the Connecticut State Bar in 2006.

== Political career ==
Johnson earned the Democratic nomination and subsequently won the general election for the Queens Civil Court judgeship in 2021. In 2023 she was selected as one of five judges running for New York Supreme Court on the Democratic party line.

On June 25, 2024, Johnson won the Democratic nomination for the Queens County Surrogate's Court judgeship with approximately 54% of the vote. She will be running against the GOP nominee, Stephen Weiner, in November 2024.
