= Boys High School (Brooklyn) =

Former public school in Brooklyn, New York

- U.S. National Register of Historic Places
- New York City Landmark
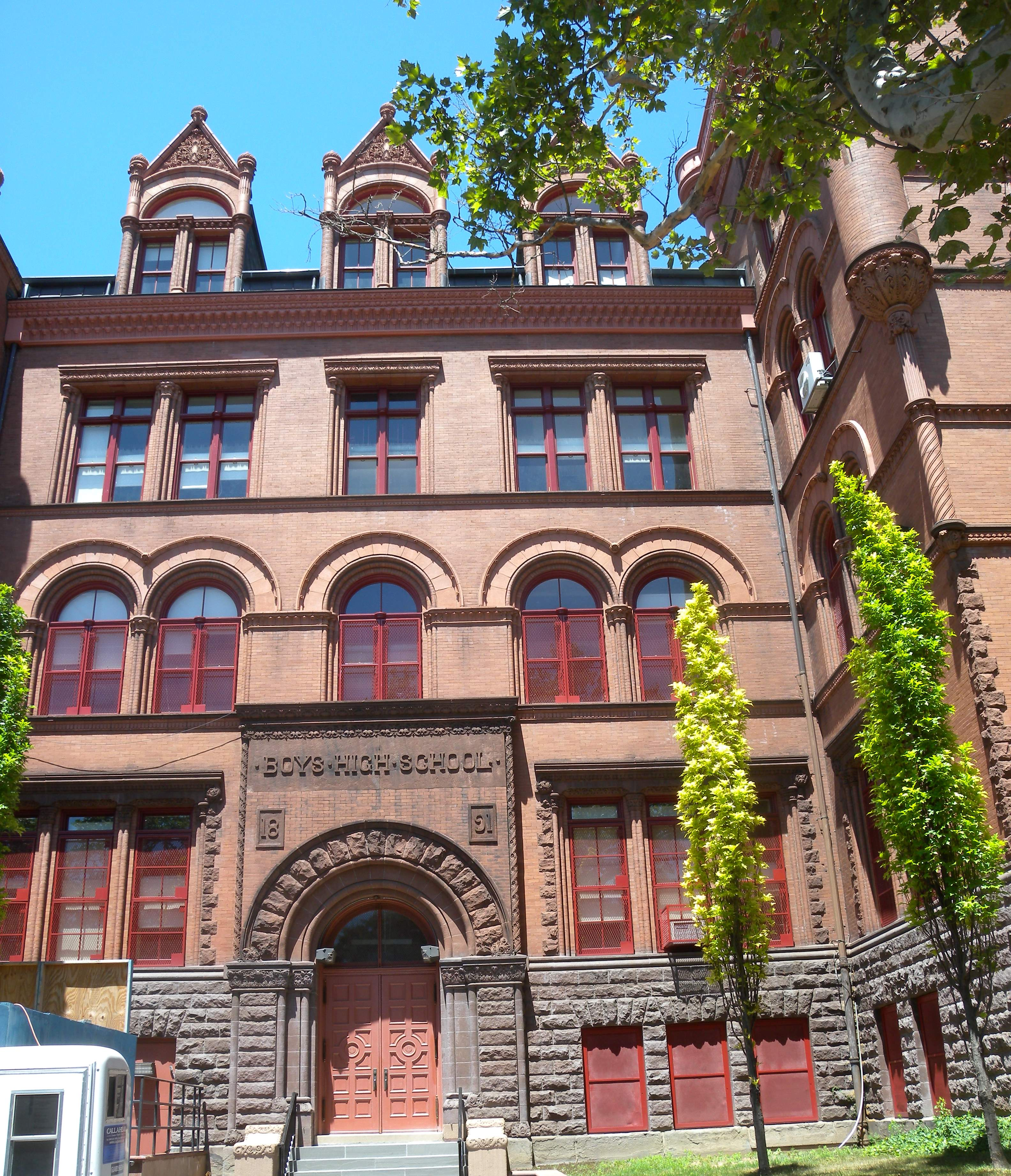
- South face

- Location within New York City Location within New York Location within the United States
- Location: 832 Marcy Avenue, Brooklyn, New York, U.S.
- Coordinates: 40°41′4″N 73°56′54″W
- Area: 1.9 acres (7,700 m^{2})
- Built: 1891 (135 years ago)
- Architect: James W. Naughton, C. B. J. Snyder
- Architectural style: Romanesque, Rundbogenstil
- NRHP reference No.: 82003361

Significant dates
- Added to NRHP: February 25, 1982 (44 years ago)
- Designated NYCL: September 23, 1975 (50 years ago)

Boys High School is a Romanesque Revival–style public school building in the Bedford–Stuyvesant neighborhood of Brooklyn, New York, United States. It is regarded as "one of Brooklyn's finest buildings".

The school is no longer in the building, as in 1975 it merged with Girls' High School to create the Boys and Girls High School on a new site.

== Architecture ==
The Romanesque Revival building is richly decorated in terracotta somewhat in the style of Louis Sullivan. The building is admired for its round corner tower, dormers, and soaring campanile.

The building was erected in 1891 on the west side of Marcy Avenue between Putnam Avenue and Madison Street. It was designed by James W. Naughton, Superintendent of Buildings at the Board of Education of the City of Brooklyn. The building is regarded as Naughton's "finest work."

When Boys High was landmarked by the New York City Landmarks Preservation Commission in 1975, the commission called it "one of the finest Romanesque Revival style buildings in the city". It was listed on the National Register of Historic Places on February 25, 1982.

The building was the exterior filming location for the Knickerbocker Hospital in the Cinemax period medical drama television series The Knick (2014–2015).

== School ==
In 1975, the same year the building was landmarked, Boys High merged with Girls' High School to become Boys and Girls High School. Boys and Girls High School immediately moved to a new building at Fulton Street and Utica Avenue.

The school was a college-preparatory program with high academic standards. Congressman Emanuel Celler described Boys High in his autobiography, "I went to Boys' High School — naturally. I say "naturally" because Boys' High School then, as now, was the high school of scholarships. Boys of Brooklyn today will tell you, "It's a hard school." It was highly competitive..."

Another Boys High graduate remembered that "I went to Boys High School in Brooklyn, a great school. It was out of the classic tradition. I guess eighty percent of the student body had to take Latin — we didn't have to; we elected Latin, because we felt it was expected of us."

== Notable alumni ==
- Isaac Asimov (1920–1992), writer
- John "the Brooklyn Bullet" Barsha (born Abraham Barshofsky; 1898–1976), American professional football player
- Jules Bender (1914–1982), collegiate and professional basketball player
- Albert Blaustein (1921–1994), civil rights and human rights lawyer and constitutional consultant
- Cy Block (1919–2004), professional Major League Baseball player
- Himan Brown (1910–2010), producer of radio and television programs
- Anatole Broyard (1920–1990), essayist, literary critic
- Emanuel Celler (1888–1981), U.S. Representative for almost 50 years
- Aaron Copland (1900–1990), classical composer, composition teacher, writer, and conductor
- Howard Cosell (born Howard William Cohen, 1918–1995), television sports journalist and author
- Mel Davis (born 1950), professional NBA basketball player
- Tommy Davis (1939–2022), Major League Baseball player
- I. A. L. Diamond (1920–1988), screenwriter
- Martin Dobelle (1906–1986), orthopedic surgeon
- Hal Draper (born Harold Dubinsky, 1914–1990), socialist activist and writer
- Ted Draper (1912–2006), historian and political writer
- Lee Farr (born Leon Farb; 1927–2017), actor
- Leon Festinger (1919–1989), social psychologist
- Louis Finkelstein (1895–1991), Chancellor of the Jewish Theological Seminary of America
- Mickey Fisher (1904/05–1963), basketball coach
- Al Goldstein (1936–2013), pornographer
- Alfred Gottschalk (1930–2009), rabbi, leader in Reform Judaism movement
- Jerome "Little Anthony" Gourdine (born 1941), lead singer of The Imperials
- Benjamin Graham (born Grossbaum,1894–1978), father of value investing
- Sihugo "Si" Green (1933–1980), professional basketball player
- Ezra E. H. Griffith (born 1942), psychiatrist
- Daniel Gutman (1901–1993), lawyer, state senator, state assemblyman, president justice of the municipal court, and law school dean
- Connie "the Hawk" Hawkins (1942–2017), NBA basketball Hall of Famer
- Will Herberg (1901–1977), political activist, philosopher, and writer
- Harold M. Jacobs (1912–1995), civic leader
- Gene Kelly (born Eugene K. Sims,1918–1979), Major League Baseball sportscaster
- Nat Krinsky (1899–1984), professional basketball player
- W. Langdon Kihn (1898–1957), portrait painter and illustrator
- Morris Kline (1908–1992), professor of mathematics
- Benjamin Lax (1915–2015), physicist elected to National Academy of Sciences
- Philip Levine (1900–1987), immuno-hematologist whose clinical research advanced knowledge on the Rhesus factor, hemolytic disease of the newborn (HDN), and blood transfusion
- William Levitt (1907–1994), real estate developer of Levittown
- Harry E. Lewis (1880–1948), lawyer, Brooklyn district attorney, New York Supreme Court Justice
- Norman Lloyd (born Perlmutter, 1914–2021), actor, director and producer
- Norman Mailer (1923–2007), novelist, journalist, playwright, screenwriter, actor and film director
- Mickey Marcus (1901–1948), U.S. Army colonel and Israel's first general
- Ernest Martin (born 1932), theatre director and manager, actor
- Abraham Maslow (1908–1970), professor of psychology
- Will Maslow (1907–2007), lawyer and civil rights leader
- Sean Michaels (born 1958), pornographic actor
- Irving "Moon"Mondschein (1924–2015), track and field champion, college football player and coach
- Jack Newfield (1938–2004), journalist
- Man Ray (born Emmanuel Radnitzky, 1890–1976), artist
- Max Roach (1924–2007), jazz percussionist, drummer, and composer
- Chris Rock (born 1965), comedian, actor, and filmmaker
- E. Ivan Rubenstein (1895–1955), lawyer and judge
- Meyer Schapiro (1904–1996), art historian
- Aubrey Schenck (1908–1999), motion picture producer
- Murray Seeman (1914-2017), lawyer and real estate developer
- Allie Sherman (1923–2015), National Football League player and head coach
- Meier Steinbrink (1880–1967), lawyer and New York Supreme Court associate justice
- Fred Thompson (1933–2019) track and field coach, and lawyer
- Lawrence Tierney (1919–2002), movie actor
- Alexander S. Wiener (1907–1976), biologist, leader in fields of forensic medicine, serology, and immunogenetics
- Lenny Wilkens (1937–2025), NBA player and coach; Hall of Fame player and coach
- Wilson Brothers, musicians and founding members of Mandrill: Lou Wilson (1941–2013), Dr. Ric Wilson (born 1943), Carlos Wilson (born 1945), and Wilfredo Wilson (born 1947)
- Izzy Yablok (1907–1983), NFL football player

== Distinguished faculty ==
- Mickey Fisher (1935–1962), basketball coach made the Final Four every year from 1956 to 1962, coach of the Israeli Men's Olympic basketball team, Rome 1960
- James Sullivan (1873–1931), principal (1907–1916), later Director of the YMCA for the American Expeditionary Forces, New York State Historian, and Director of Archives and History

== See also ==
- List of high schools in New York City
- List of New York City Designated Landmarks in Brooklyn
- National Register of Historic Places listings in Brooklyn
