= Michael A. Simons =

American legal scholar (born 1964)

Dean of the St. John's University School of Law
- In office 2009 – June 2024
- Preceded by: Mary C. Daly
- Succeeded by: Jelani Jefferson Exum

Personal details
- Born: November 22, 1964 (age 61) Westbury, New York, U.S.
- Education: College of the Holy Cross (BA); Harvard University (JD)

Michael A. Simons (born November 22, 1964) is an American legal scholar. He is the John V. Brennan Professor of Law & Ethics at the St. John's University School of Law, where he served as the dean from 2009 to 2024.

== Early life and education ==
Simons was born on November 22, 1964, in Westbury, New York. He graduated from the College of the Holy Cross with a B.A., magna cum laude, in English literature in 1986. He then earned his Juris Doctor (J.D.), magna cum laude, in 1989 from Harvard Law School, where he served as an editor and co-chair of the Harvard Law Review. After law school, he served as a law clerk for Judge Louis F. Oberdorfer of the United States District Court for the District of Columbia from 1989 to 1990.

== Career ==
Simons worked as a staff attorney in Washington, D.C., for The Washington Post from 1990 to 1991 and was an associate attorney specializing in criminal law at the New York law firm of Stillman & Friedman from 1991 to 1995. He then was an assistant United States attorney for the Southern District of New York from 1995 to 1998. He became an assistant professor of law at the St. John's University School of Law in 1998, an associate professor there in 2001, and was promoted to a full professorship in 2003. He received the law school's appointment as its John V. Brennan Professor of Law & Ethics in 2009.

In June 2010, Simons became the ninth dean to head the St. John's University School of Law, replacing Mary C. Daly. He was succeeded by Jelani Jefferson Exum in June 2024. At the time he stepped down as dean, he was also chair of the New York State Commission on Prosecutorial Conduct.
