= E. Ivan Rubenstein =

Jewish-American lawyer and judge

Ephraim Ivan Rubenstein (January 1, 1895 – February 18, 1955), was a Jewish-American lawyer and judge from Brooklyn.

== Life ==
Rubenstein was born on January 1, 1895, in Brooklyn, New York, the son of Moses Rubenstein and Minnie Hepner. His father was appraiser of the Surrogates' Court of Kings County and the son of a Russian immigrant.

Rubenstein graduated from the grammar department of Public School No. 147 in 1910. He then went to the Boys High School of Brooklyn, where he served as captain of the football team in 1913, and graduated from there in 1914. He graduated from the Brooklyn Law School with an LL.B. in 1917. In September 1917, during World War I, he enlisted in the United States Army and was assigned to duty at Camp Upton. He soon returned to Brooklyn and served as a member of Draft Board No. 68 until he was honorably discharged at the end of the war. He served as a clerk for Algeron I. Nova, and in 1925 he and Nova formed the law firm Nova, Rubenstein and Rosling. He was counsel to the Kings County Clerk from 1940 to 1942.

In January 1942, Governor Herbert H. Lehman appointed Rubenstein Justice of the New York Supreme Court, Second Judicial District to fill a vacancy caused by the election of Justice Francis D. McGarey to Kings County Surrogate. The State Senate immediately confirmed the nomination, and in February he was inducted into office. In the November 1942 election, he was elected Justice with endorsement from the Democratic and Republican parties. He was sworn in at the end of the year by now-Justice Algeron I. Nova. In January 1947, he became a member of the Appellate Term. The Appellate Division designated him acting Surrogate of Kings County following the illness and death of Surrogate McGarey until Governor Thomas E. Dewey appointed Roy M. D. Richardson to fill the vacancy as Surrogate in July 1950. In the November election that year, he was elected Surrogate as the Democratic-Liberal candidate over Richardson. He served as Surrogate until his death.

Rubenstein was a trustee of the New York and Brooklyn Federations for the Support of Jewish Philanthropic Societies of New York City, a director of the Daughters of Zion Hebrew Day Nursery School of Brooklyn, and a member of the Freemasons, the Elks, Phi Delta, the American Legion, the Brooklyn Academy of Arts and Sciences, and the Brooklyn Jewish Center. In 1925, he married Mildred Harris Levy at the Brooklyn Jewish Center in a ceremony performed by Rabbi Israel H. Levinthal. Their children were Mrs. Judith Cramer, Mrs. Ruth Koeppel, and Seth. He was also vice-president of the Brooklyn Hebrew Orphan Asylum, vice-president and trustee of Congregation Beth Elohim, a director of the Inter-Faith Movement, and a member of the Brooklyn Bar Association.

Rubenstein died in the Columbia-Presbyterian Medical Center on February 18, 1955. He was buried in Mount Lebanon Cemetery in Glendale, Queens.
