= George Digby (baseball scout) =

American baseball scout (1917–2014)

Digby

George J. Digby (August 31, 1917 – May 2, 2014) was an American baseball scout and consultant in Major League Baseball.

== Biography ==
A native of New Orleans, Louisiana, Digby started his professional career in 1944. He was coaching high school baseball in his homeland when a Boston Red Sox executive came to sign his best pitcher, Dick Callahan.

After that, Digby worked in the Boston organization for more than 60 years, half a century as a scout, 14 more as a consultant. Throughout the years, he traveled the South looking raw talent for the Red Sox. Among his finds were Red Sox graduates Tom Bolton, Steve Curry, Mike Greenwell, Jody Reed and Marc Sullivan. But Digby put great emphasis on signing future Hall of Famer Wade Boggs, after the Red Sox had reports that questioned Boggs' ability to be a Major League player, as he fought hard to convince the team that should draft the young man with the smooth swing. Finally, in 1976 Digby drafted Boggs in the seventh round and signed him for $7,500 and a college scholarship.

In 1948, one year after Jackie Robinson broke the baseball barrier in the Majors, the Birmingham Barons of the Southern Association were an affiliate team of the Red Sox who played at Rickwood Field in Alabama. The Barons, an all-white squad, shared the same field with the Birmingham Black Barons, an all-black team of the Negro leagues. At that time Digby spotted Willie Mays, by then a 17-year-old outfielder. Boston signed the Barons' player/manager Lorenzo ″Piper″ Davis for $15,000.

Digby has served as role model, inspiration, catalyst and friend for many young scouts. The George Digby Award was created by the Red Sox in honour of Digby, to recognize annually the scout that has provided outstanding services for the organization.

In 2008 Digby was selected for induction into the Boston Red Sox Hall of Fame, becoming the first scout to gain the honors. Digby is also in the Florida Scouts Hall of Fame. He was inducted in 2000 and his plaque is near the press box at Tropicana Field. The plaque shows that he has signed 53 Major League players.

Digby died on May 2, 2014, aged 96.
