= Wade Boggs =

American baseball player (born 1958)

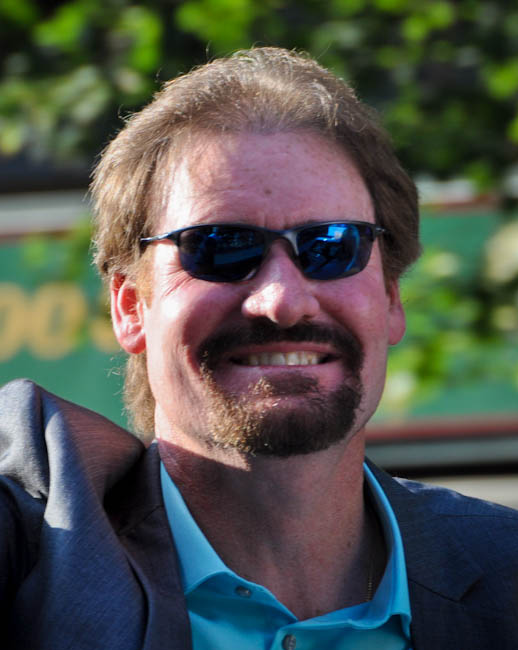
- Boggs in 2013
- Third baseman
- Born: June 15, 1958 (age 68); Omaha, Nebraska, U.S.
- Batted: Left Threw: Right

MLB debut
- April 10, 1982, for the Boston Red Sox

Last MLB appearance
- August 27, 1999, for the Tampa Bay Devil Rays

MLB statistics
- Batting average: .328
- Hits: 3,010
- Home runs: 118
- Runs batted in: 1,014
- Stats at Baseball Reference

Teams
- Boston Red Sox (1982–1992); New York Yankees (1993–1997); Tampa Bay Devil Rays (1998–1999)

Career highlights and awards
- 12× All-Star (1985–1996); World Series champion (1996); 2× Gold Glove Award (1994, 1995); 8× Silver Slugger Award (1983, 1986–1989, 1991, 1993, 1994); 5× AL batting champion (1983, 1985–1988); Boston Red Sox No. 26 retired; Tampa Bay Rays No. 12 retired; Boston Red Sox Hall of Fame; Tampa Bay Rays Hall of Fame

Member of the National

Baseball Hall of Fame
- Induction: 2005
- Vote: 91.9% (first ballot)

Wade Anthony Boggs (born June 15, 1958), nicknamed "Chicken Man", is an American former professional baseball third baseman. He spent 18 seasons in Major League Baseball (MLB), primarily with the Boston Red Sox. He also played for the New York Yankees (1993–1997), winning the 1996 World Series with them, and finished his career with the Tampa Bay Devil Rays (1998–1999).

Boggs became the 23rd player to reach 3,000 career hits. His hitting in the 1980s and 1990s made him a perennial contender for American League (AL) batting titles, winning 5 in 6 years from 1983 to 1988. His .328 career batting average is the highest of any living former player. Boggs is part of the Red Sox Hall of Fame and the Rays Hall of Fame, and he was elected to the National Baseball Hall of Fame in 2005 in his first year of eligibility.

With 12 straight All-Star appearances, Boggs is third only to Brooks Robinson and George Brett in number of consecutive appearances as a third baseman. In 1997, he ranked number 95 on the Sporting News list of the 100 Greatest Baseball Players. Boggs, a 1976 graduate of Plant High School in Tampa, Florida, resides in the Tampa Palms neighborhood of Tampa.

== Early life ==
Born in Omaha, Nebraska, the youngest of three sons of Winfield Kennedy Boggs Jr. and Sue Nell Graham, Wade had a regimented military upbringing. Winfield and Sue met in 1946 at a military base in Georgia. Winfield served with the Marines in World War II and flew for the Air Force in the Korean War, while Sue piloted mail planes in World War II. The Boggs family lived in several different places (including Puerto Rico and Savannah, Georgia) before settling in Tampa, Florida, when Wade was 11 years old. He attended Plant High School in Tampa, where he played baseball and was an All-State football player as a senior. Boggs played quarterback until his senior year, when he switched positions to avoid injury and thereby protect his baseball career. His success as a left-footed placekicker and punter earned him a scholarship offer from the University of South Carolina. He graduated from Plant High School in 1976 and was selected by the Boston Red Sox in the seventh round of the 1976 MLB draft on the advice of veteran scout George Digby. He signed with the club for $7,500.

== Professional career ==
=== Minor leagues ===
Boggs climbed slowly through the Red Sox minor league system over a period of six years, despite maintaining a better than .300 batting average consistently after his first year. He later recounted, "when I was in the minor leagues, I was told that I have no power, can’t field and am too slow." Boggs played in the longest game in professional baseball history as a member of the Pawtucket Red Sox in 1981 against Cal Ripken Jr. and the Rochester Red Wings. It lasted for 33 innings over eight hours and 25 minutes. The game took place from April 18–19, 1981, concluding on June 23, 1981, at McCoy Stadium in Pawtucket, Rhode Island. During his last year in the minor leagues with Pawtucket, he led the league with a .335 batting-average, 167 hits, and 41 doubles.

=== Boston Red Sox ===
A left-handed hitter, Boggs won five batting titles starting in 1983. He also batted .349 in his rookie year, which would have won the batting title, but he was 121 plate appearances short of the required minimum of 502. From 1982 to 1988, Boggs hit below .349 only once, hitting .325 in 1984. From 1983 to 1989, Boggs rattled off seven consecutive seasons in which he collected 200 or more hits, an AL record for consecutive 200-hit seasons that was surpassed by Seattle's Ichiro Suzuki. Boggs also had six seasons with 200 or more hits, 100+ runs, and 40+ doubles. Although he did not win another batting title after 1988 (his batting title that year broke Bill Madlock's MLB record of four by a third baseman), he regularly appeared among the league leaders in hitting.

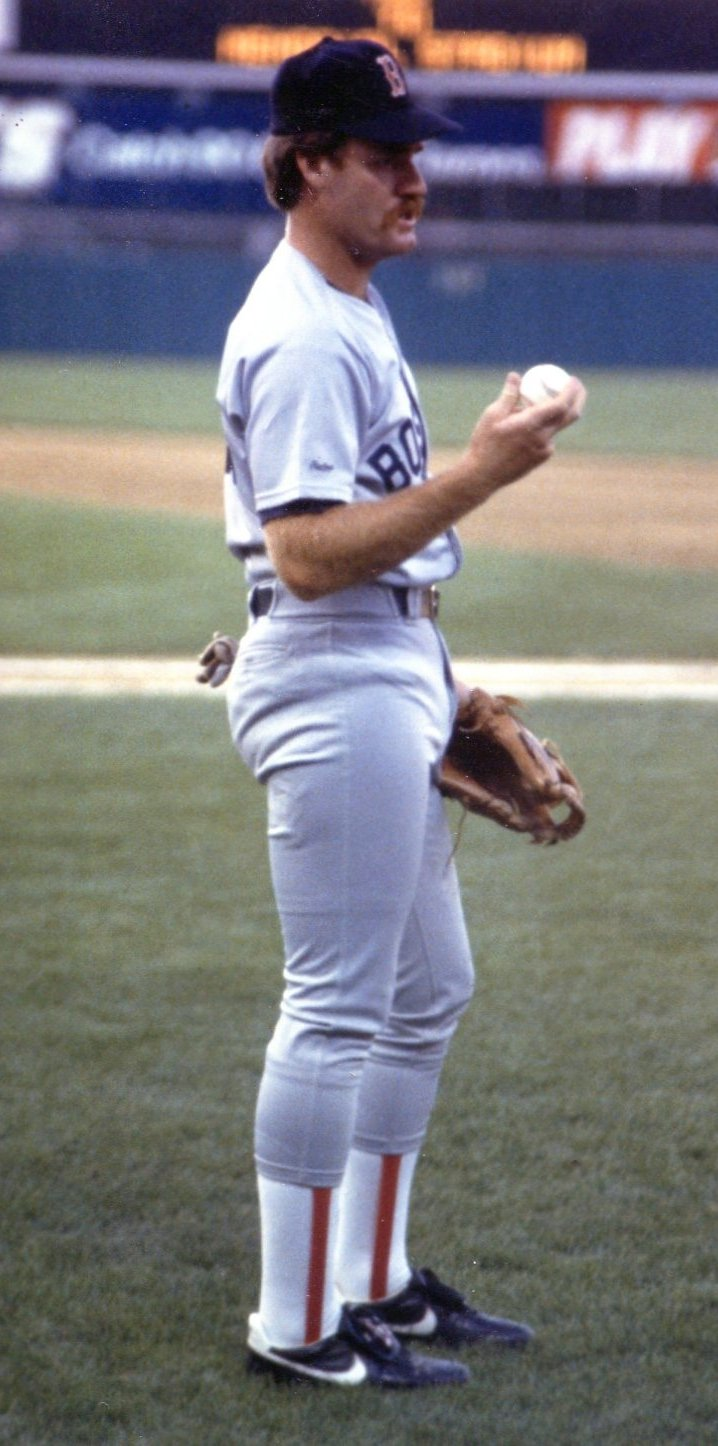
Boggs with the Red Sox in 1988

In 1985, Boggs recorded hits in 135 games, tying a major league record. He also had 240 hits and 72 multihit games, setting club records for both.

In 1986, Boggs made it to the World Series with the Red Sox, but they lost to the New York Mets in seven games. He holds the record for batting average at Fenway Park, at .369.

Boggs had a power surge in 1987, setting career highs with 24 home runs, 89 RBIs, and a .588 slugging percentage. He never hit half as many home runs in any other season.

In 1992, Boggs slumped to .259—one of only three times in his career that he failed to reach .300.

=== New York Yankees ===
After the 1992 season, Boggs became a free agent. He was heavily pursued by two teams, the Los Angeles Dodgers and the Red Sox's arch-rival New York Yankees. He signed a three-year contract with the Yankees worth $11 million, after they added the third year to the contract that the Dodgers would not offer. Boggs earned All-Star appearances and batted over .300 in four straight seasons, while collecting two Gold Glove Awards for his defense.

In 1996, Boggs helped the Yankees win their first World Series title in 18 years, against the Atlanta Braves, which gave him his only World Series ring. In game four, the Yankees rallied from six runs down to tie it, Boggs was called on to pinch hit in the 10th inning. Using the batting eye for which he was known throughout his career, he drew a bases-loaded walk from Steve Avery, forcing in the go-ahead run. The Yankees won 8–6, evening the series. After the Yankees won the series in game 6, Boggs memorably celebrated by jumping on the back of an NYPD horse, touring the field with his index finger in the air, despite his self-professed fear of horses.

=== Tampa Bay Devil Rays ===
Boggs signed with the Tampa Bay Devil Rays for the final two seasons of his career. He hit the first home run in Devil Rays history in the sixth inning of the inaugural game on March 31, 1998. On August 7, 1999, he collected his 3,000th hit with a home run. Despite his reputation for lacking home-run power, he was the first player in history to make such a hit a home run. Two yellow seats among the rest of the Tropicana's blue seats mark where both historic balls landed in right field, each with a small metal plate noting it as the area where the ball landed. Boggs retired in 1999 after sustaining a knee injury, leaving with a career batting average of .328 and 3,010 hits. His last game was on August 27, 1999; he went 0-for-3 with a walk against the Cleveland Indians. Since he signed with the first-year expansion team Devil Rays so late in his career, he is the oldest former Devil Ray. (This only includes when they were called the Devil Rays.)

== Legacy ==
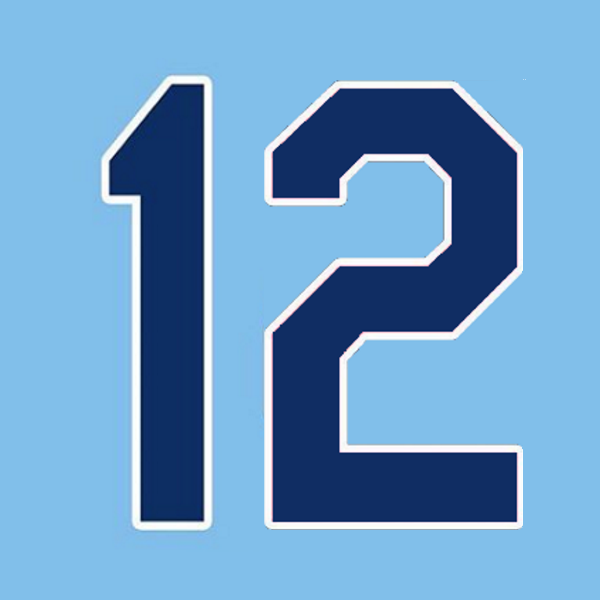
Wade Boggs's number 12 was retired by the Tampa Bay Devil Rays in 2000.

Wade Boggs's number 26 was retired by the Boston Red Sox in 2016.

Boggs' career paralleled that of Tony Gwynn, who also debuted (in the National League) in 1982. Boggs and Gwynn were the premier contact hitters of their era. They both won multiple batting titles—Boggs, five and Gwynn, eight—and each won four straight batting titles to join Ty Cobb, Rogers Hornsby, and Rod Carew as the only players to do so. Gwynn and Boggs each hit over .350 in four straight seasons, the only players to do so since 1931. They joined Lou Brock and Rod Carew as the only players whose careers ended after World War II who finished with 3,000 hits and fewer than 160 home runs.

Boggs was inducted into the Baseball Hall of Fame in 2005 and is depicted with a Red Sox cap.

Tommy John noted that Boggs always seemed to know what the next pitch was going to be. "...for pure hitting, Boggs is the best I've ever seen," John wrote in 1991. "He's a phenomenon, a pure hitting machine. I've never seen anything like him. He lit me up."

Boggs recorded 2-1/3 innings of pitching at the MLB level. His main pitch was a knuckleball, which he used 16 times (along with one fastball) in one shutout inning for the Yankees against the Anaheim Angels in a 1997 game. Boggs recorded a strike-out pitching during that game. Boggs also pitched 1-1/3 innings for Tampa Bay against the Orioles in a 1999 game, allowing one run.

On December 21, 2015, the Red Sox announced that they would retire Boggs' number (26). The ceremony was held on May 26, 2016. Boggs occasionally appears in the Yankees' annual Old-Timers' Day, a celebration of past Yankees in which the players play a multi-inning game of baseball at Yankee Stadium.

His own style included mental preparedness techniques, which consisted of visualizing four at-bats each evening before a game and imagining himself successfully getting four hits.

As of June 8, 1986—over the course of the previous 162 games (equivalent to a full season, though across two seasons)—Boggs was hitting .400, with 254 hits in 635 at-bats.

In his 18-year major league career, Boggs recorded three five-hit games and 59 four-hit games. On June 29, 1987, he had a career-high seven RBIs against the Orioles in a 14–3 victory at Fenway.

The Tampa Bay Devil Rays retired his number 12 on April 7, 2000. It is the only number to have been issued only once by the Rays.

The Boston Red Sox inducted Boggs into the team's Hall of Fame in 2004 and his number 26 was retired during a pre-game ceremony on May 26, 2016.

Boggs was known for his superstitions. He ate chicken before every game (Jim Rice once called Boggs "chicken man"), woke up at the same time every day, and ran sprints at 7:17 pm. His route to and from his position in the field beat a path to the home dugout. He drew the Hebrew word chai (meaning "living") in the batter's box before each at-bat, though he is not Jewish. He asked Fenway Park public-address announcer Sherm Feller not to say his uniform number when he introduced him because Boggs once broke out of a slump on a day when Feller forgot to announce his number.

== Life outside baseball ==
=== The Margo Adams affair and palimony lawsuit ===
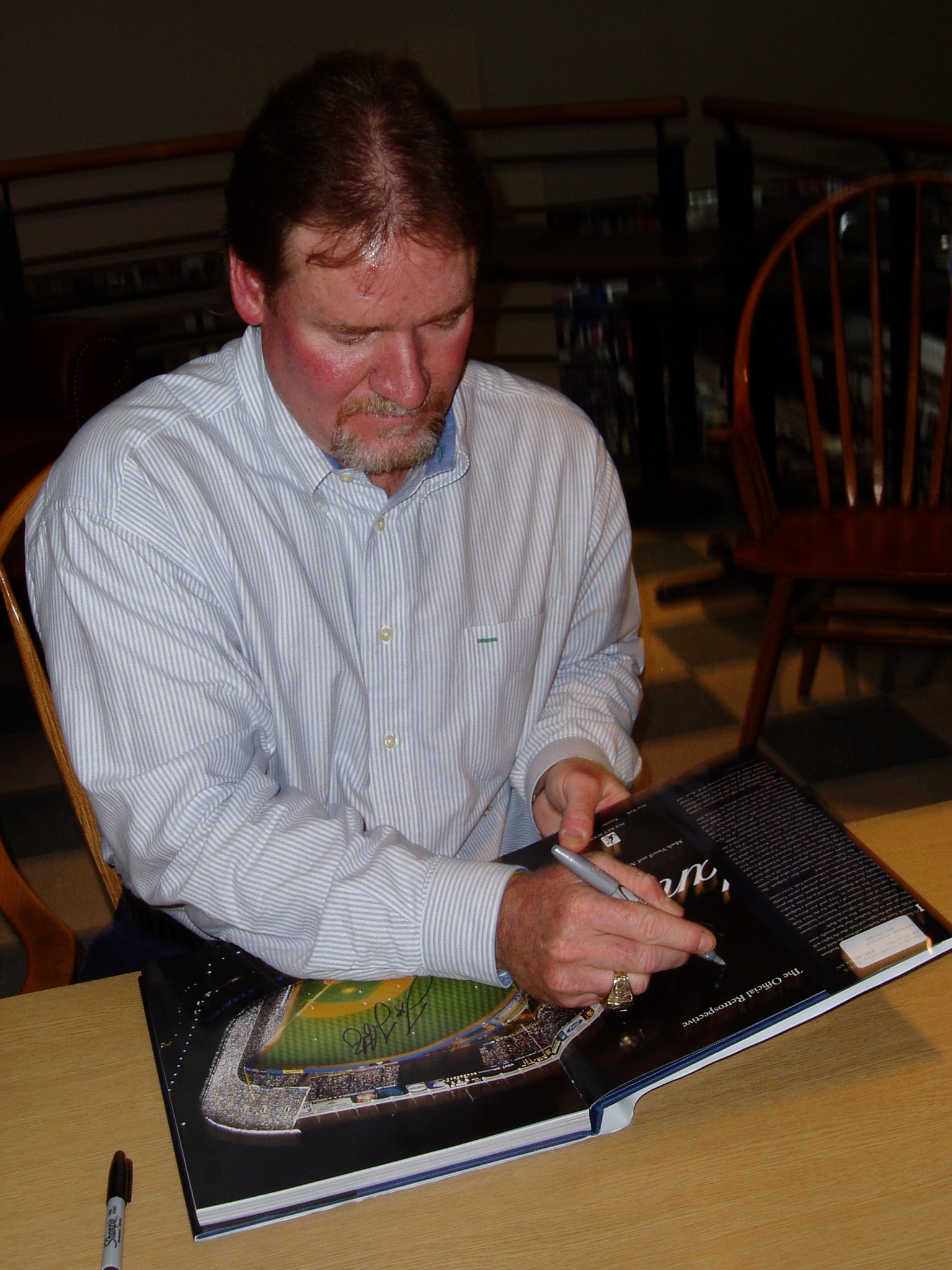
Boggs autographing the book Yankee Stadium at a book signing on September 23, 2008.

Boggs garnered nonbaseball-related media attention in 1989 for his four-year extramarital affair with Margo Adams, a California mortgage broker. After Boggs ended the relationship in 1988, Adams filed a $12 million lawsuit for emotional distress and breach of oral contract. She argued that Boggs verbally agreed to compensate her for lost income and services performed while accompanying him on road trips. Boggs' reputation was further sullied when Adams agreed to an interview with Penthouse magazine in which she discussed intimate details of her time with him. While acknowledging the affair, Boggs went on the offensive to combat the wave of negative press, denying many of her claims. Boggs' rebuttal included an appearance on the ABC program 20/20 in which he presented his side of the story to Barbara Walters. In February 1989, an appeals court threw out $11.5 million of the initial lawsuit, ruling that Adams could not seek compensation for emotional distress. The remaining demand for $500,000 was settled out of court later that year for an undisclosed amount.

=== Hall of Fame plaque cap logo controversy ===
Before his retirement, Boggs was plagued by newspaper reports that the expansion Devil Rays financially compensated him in return for selecting a Devil Rays cap for his plaque at the Baseball Hall of Fame, though he has denied that this condition was part of his contract. In light of those reports (and other rumors that teams were offering number retirement, money, or organizational jobs in exchange for the cap designation), the Hall decided in 2001 to change its practice of deferring to players' wishes about cap logo selection and reinforced its authority to determine with which cap the player would be depicted. Boggs is wearing a Boston cap on his plaque.

=== Family ===
Wade and his wife Debbie have two children, Brett and Meagann.

Boggs' mother died in June 1986 in a car accident in Tampa while he was with the Red Sox. Shortly after her death, Boggs and his father bought a fish camp on U.S. 301 just south of Hawthorne, Florida, that they named Yankee Landing-Finway Fish Camp; his father operated it until shortly before he died.

Wade Boggs was named one of the "Top 10 Most Superstitious Athletes" by Men's Fitness for his well-known superstitions about baseball, including his habit of eating chicken before every game and practicing at only specific times of day. His chicken-eating habits earned him the nickname "Chicken Man".

=== Wrestling ===
As a baseball player, Boggs made an appearance for the professional wrestling promotion World Wrestling Federation (WWF) in 1992. He appeared in a vignette with wrestler Mr. Perfect (Curt Hennig) in which Perfect played baseball. The two remained good friends afterward; 15 years later, in 2007, Boggs inducted the late Perfect into the WWE Hall of Fame. In the DVD The Life and Times of Mr. Perfect, Boggs related how Hennig saved his life, carrying Boggs to help after he had severely cut his leg climbing over a broken barbed wire fence during a hunting trip. He also made a guest appearance on the December 13, 1999, episode of WWF Raw Is War wherein he was involved in a brief segment with Dwayne "The Rock" Johnson.

=== Television ===
Boggs was one of the baseball players featured in The Simpsons episode "Homer at the Bat" in which he was recruited as a ringer by Mr. Burns for the Power Plant's softball team, only to later be knocked out in a bar fight by Barney Gumble. Boggs appeared as himself in the Cheers episode "Bar Wars" in which he was sent to the bar as an apology by a rival bar. He was accosted by the regulars, who thought he was a fake. (Cheers writer Ken Levine revealed in 2009 that Boggs had promised to bring Kirstie Alley's panties back to spring training with him, but in fact brought back his mistress Margo Adams' panties, instead.) In Seinfeld's "The Chaperone", George convinces the Yankees to switch to cotton uniforms, assuring manager Buck Showalter that the Bombers would be "five degrees cooler than the other team." Wade Boggs was quoted as saying, "What a fabric! Finally, we can breathe."

Boggs is the subject of an apocryphal story in which, on a cross-country flight during his career, he drank a very large number of beers, sometimes given as exactly 64 (a number Boggs has denied). In 2011, he appeared in the Psych episode "Dead Man's Curveball", in which he tells Danny Glover's character that the real number was 73. In 2015, he guest-starred in the It's Always Sunny in Philadelphia season-10 premiere "The Gang Beats Boggs", in which the characters try to drink more than 70 beers while flying across the country. Dee confuses Boggs with Boss Hogg, while Charlie believes that Boggs is dead. Boggs reportedly told actor Charlie Day that counting postflight excursions, the total for the day was 107.

In August 2017, Boggs served as a fill-in color commentator for some Red Sox games played in Tampa Bay and broadcast on New England Sports Network, working with play-by-play announcer Dave O'Brien.

In 2018, Wade Boggs was mentioned in a Good Mythical Morning episode by hosts Rhett and Link, involving his Wade Boggs .352 Bar that was made in 1990. He later made a cameo appearance on the show in 2021.

=== Cancer diagnosis ===
On September 7, 2024, Boggs revealed that he was battling prostate cancer. On February 17, 2025, Boggs revealed that he was declared cancer-free.

== Bibliography ==
- Fowl Tips: My Favorite Chicken Recipes (1984). Wakefield, Rhode Island: Narragansett Graphics. OCLC 23719240.
- Boggs! (1986). Contemporary Books, ISBN 0-8092-5063-2.
- The Techniques of Modern Hitting (1990). Perigee Books. ISBN 0-399-51595-X (with David Brisson).

== See also ==
- DHL Hometown Heroes
- List of Major League Baseball annual doubles leaders
- List of Major League Baseball annual runs scored leaders
- List of Major League Baseball career assists as a third baseman leaders
- List of Major League Baseball career batting average leaders
- List of Major League Baseball career doubles leaders
- List of Major League Baseball career on-base percentage leaders
- List of Major League Baseball career putouts as a third baseman leaders
- List of Major League Baseball career runs scored leaders
- List of Major League Baseball career runs batted in leaders
- List of Major League Baseball career times on base leaders
- List of Major League Baseball career total bases leaders
- List of Major League Baseball doubles records
- List of Major League Baseball hit records
- List of people from Omaha, Nebraska
- Major League Baseball titles leaders

Awards and achievements
Preceded by Dwight Evans; Eddie Murray	American League annual on-base percentage leader 1983; 1985—1989	Succeeded by Eddie Murray; Rickey Henderson
