= John P. Lomenzo =

American lawyer and politician

John P. Lomenzo (August 12, 1915 – June 7, 2004, Rochester, Monroe County, New York) was an American lawyer and politician.

== Life ==
He graduated from Niagara University and Fordham University School of Law, and was admitted to the bar in 1939. He was a judge of the Monroe County Court when he was the Republican candidate for New York State Comptroller in 1962. He was defeated by the incumbent Democrat Arthur Levitt Sr., but was appointed Secretary of State of New York by Governor Nelson A. Rockefeller on August 22, 1963, and stayed in office until he resigned in December 1973 and was replaced by Governor Malcolm Wilson after Rockefeller's resignation. In 1970-71, he was the President of the National Association of Secretaries of State. He was an alternate delegate to the 1964 Republican National Convention.

Since 1975, he had been a director of Conair Corporation. He was a partner in the law firm of Field, Lomenzo & Turret.

His son John P. Lomenzo Jr., has been Town Court Justice of Penfield, New York since 1995.

== Sources ==
- "Paid Notice: Deaths LOMENZO, JOHN P." The New York Times. June 11, 2004.
- SEC file on Conair, at Edgar on-line
- Political Graveyard
- "Monroe County Bar pays tribute to deceased colleagues". Daily Record (Rochester, NY). November 30, 2004.
- Fordham alumni notes

Party political offices
Preceded by James A. Lundy	Republican nominee for New York State Comptroller; 1962	Succeeded by Charles T. Lanigan
Political offices
Preceded by Caroline Simon	Secretary of State of New York; 1963–1974	Succeeded by John J. Ghezzi
