= Izzy Yablok =

American football player (1907–1983)

No. 1
- Position: Back

Personal information
- Born: July 28, 1907; New York, New York, U.S.
- Died: August 14, 1983 (aged 76); Encino, California, U.S.
- Listed height: 5 ft 10 in (1.78 m)
- Listed weight: 172 lb (78 kg)

Career information
- High school: Boys (Brooklyn, New York)
- College: Colgate

Career history
- Brooklyn Dodgers (1930–1931); Staten Island Stapletons (1931)
- Stats at Pro Football Reference

Julius "Izzy" Yablok (July 28, 1907 – August 14, 1983) was an American football back who played two seasons in the National Football League (NFL) with the Brooklyn Dodgers and Staten Island Stapletons. He played college football at Colgate University and attended Boys High School in Brooklyn, New York.

Yablok was Jewish and nicknamed "Indian".
