= John J. Ghezzi =

American lawyer and politician

John J. Ghezzi (January 1, 1911 – May 9, 1983 Albany, Albany County, New York) was an American lawyer and politician.

== Life ==
He was born in Albany, New York, on January 1, 1911 and was educated in the Albany Public School system. He graduated from Albany High school in 1928. He attended Fordham University and Albany Law School, and graduated, with honors, from St. John's University School of Law in 1933. He worked for the Louis Yaguda law firm after passing the bar exam. He enlisted in the U.S. Army on March 13, 1942 and was assigned to the 109th Infantry Regiment of the 28th Infantry Division. He was honorably discharged as a First Sergeant in October 1945 after serving 22 months in the European Theater of Operations. He entered state government service in 1949, serving as an unemployment insurance referee and an attorney in the corporations division of the Department of State until he was appointed Director of the State Elections and Law Bureau in 1959. He had been Deputy Secretary of State in charge of the Division of Corporations since 1965 when he was appointed Secretary of State of New York by Governor Malcolm Wilson in 1974.

== Sources ==
- "John J. Ghezzi Dies in Albany; Ex-New York State Secretary". The New York Times. May 11, 1983.
- Military enlistment file, at National Archives

Political offices
Preceded by John P. Lomenzo	Secretary of State of New York; 1974–1975	Succeeded by Mario Cuomo
