= Elaine Weddington Steward =

American lawyer

- Born: Elaine Weddington; 1963 (age 62–63)
- Education: St. John's University; St. John's University School of Law
- Occupation: Lawyer
- Employer: Boston Red Sox (1988–present)
- Spouse: Chuck Steward
- Children: 3
- Awards: Boston Red Sox Hall of Fame (2024)

Elaine Weddington Steward (born 1963) is an American lawyer working for the Boston Red Sox of Major League Baseball (MLB) as an assistant general manager. She is an inductee of the Boston Red Sox Hall of Fame.

== Biography ==
As a teen growing up in New York City, Steward was a New York Mets fan, and often was a babysitter for outfielder Félix Millán. She won the Jackie Robinson Foundation program scholarship in sports management, and went on to attend St. John's University in Queens, New York. She graduated with honors earning a bachelor's degree in Athletic Administration in 1984. She then went on to St. John's University School of Law and graduated with a J.D. degree in 1987.

While Steward remained in school, she was an intern in the New York Mets' public relations department under Peter Ueberroth.

In 1988, Steward was hired by the Boston Red Sox as an associate counsel; she was promoted to assistant general manager in January 1990. She became the first African American woman, and second female minority, to hold an executive position for a major-league baseball team.

As of 1997, Steward and her husband, Chuck, had three children.

Steward was selected as one of the "Ten Outstanding Young Leaders of Boston" by the Greater Boston Chamber of Commerce in 1999. She was also elected into the YWCA's Academy of Women Achievers. During her time at St John’s University, she received the Outstanding Alumna Award from the Black Alumni Association and the St. John’s University President’s Medal. Later on, she went on to receive the National Association of Black Journalists Sports Task Force’s Sam Lacy Pioneer Award, and the Jackie Robinson Foundation Sports Management award and scholarship.

Steward was featured in the National Baseball Hall of Fame and Museum's "Women in Baseball" exhibit in Cooperstown, New York. She was inducted to the Boston Red Sox Hall of Fame in 2024.
