= St. John's University School of Law =

Catholic law school in Jamaica, Queens, New York, US

Coordinates: 40.72400°N 73.79636°W

- Established: 1925; 101 years ago
- School type: Private Catholic law school
- Dean: Jelani Jefferson Exum
- Location: Jamaica, New York, U.S.
- Enrollment: 798
- Faculty: 43 (full-time)
- USNWR ranking: 63rd (tie) (2025)
- Bar pass rate: 87.10% (2023 first-time takers)
- Website: www.stjohns.edu/law

St. John's University School of Law is a Roman Catholic law school in Jamaica, Queens, New York, United States, affiliated with St. John's University.

The School of Law was founded in 1925, and confers Juris Doctor degrees and degrees for Master of Laws in Bankruptcy and Master of Laws in U.S. Studies. Over 15,000 St. John's Law graduates are practicing law in the United States and foreign jurisdictions. In 2022, 85.53% of the law school's first-time test takers passed a bar exam.

== LL.M. in Bankruptcy law ==
St. John's University School of Law offers the only LL.M. in bankruptcy law in the United States. The program is a 30 credit LL.M., with 6 credits devoted towards a thesis. St. John's School of Law offers over two dozen classes focusing on various issues in bankruptcy. Required courses for the program are: Reorganization Under Chapter 11; Bankruptcy Fraud, Ethics, and Malpractice; Bankruptcy Taxation; Bankruptcy Jurisdiction; Bankruptcy Procedure; and Consumer Bankruptcy. Classes are taught by a mixture of law professors, Federal Bankruptcy Court judges, and practicing attorneys. The St. John's LL.M. in Bankruptcy Program is fully accredited. It has been approved by the New York State Department of Education, and has received the acquiescence of the American Bar Association.

== Admissions ==
For the class entering in 2023, St. John's University School of Law accepted 41.48% of applicants, with 26.50% of those accepted enrolling. The average enrollee had a 162 LSAT score and 3.71 undergraduate GPA.

== Bar passage rates ==
In 2023, 87.10% of St. John’s first-time takers passed a bar examination. St. John's University School of Law typically ranks in the top 4 – 7 in bar exam passage for first-time test takers among the fifteen New York State law schools:

July 2004 – 87% / Overall New York State Average – 76.5%

July 2005 – 89% (4th) / Overall New York State Average – 75.9%

July 2006 – 91% (4th) / Overall New York State Average 79.4%

July 2007 – 90% (6th) / Overall New York State Average – 79.1%

July 2008 – 91.8% (7th) / Overall New York State Average – 83.2%

July 2009 – 92.1% (4th) / Overall New York State Average – 79.8%

July 2010 – 87% (6th) / Overall New York State Average – 86%

July 2011 – 88% (7th) / Overall New York State Average – 86%

July 2013 - 87.5% (7th) / Overall New York State Average – 88%

July 2014 - 87% (4th) / Overall New York State Average - 83%

July 2019 - 89% (5th) / Overall New York State Average - 88%

== Ranking ==
National Ranking: for 2025, U.S. News & World Report ranked St. John's Law tied for 63rd.

== Employment ==
According to St. John's University School of Law's official 2018 ABA-required disclosures, 82.3% of the Class of 2018 obtained full-time, long-term, JD-required employment ten months after graduation. St. John's University School of Law's Law School Transparency under-employment score is 7.1%, indicating the percentage of the Class of 2018 unemployed, pursuing an additional degree, or working in a non-professional, short-term, or part-time job ten months after graduation.

== Costs ==
The total cost of attendance (indicating the cost of tuition, fees, and living expenses) at St. John's University School of Law for the 2014–2015 academic year is $76,614. The Law School Transparency estimated debt-financed cost of attendance for three years is $285,041.

== Publications ==
- St. John's Law Review
- American Bankruptcy Institute Law Review
- Journal of Catholic Legal Studies (formerly The Catholic Lawyer)
- Journal of Civil Rights and Economic Development
- New York International Law Review
- Commercial Division Online Law Report
- N.Y. Real Property Law Journal
- Admiralty Practicum

== Conrad B. Duberstein Moot Court Competition ==
The Conrad B. Duberstein Moot Court Competition is an annual bankruptcy moot court competition sponsored by St. John's University School of Law and the American Bankruptcy Institute (ABI). The competition is named in memory of former Chief Judge Conrad B. Duberstein, who was a St. John's alumnus and former ABI Director. The competition focuses on significant issues in bankruptcy practice. It is the largest single site appellate moot court competition, with approximately 60 law school teams participating. It is also the only bankruptcy moot court competition in the nation. Bankruptcy practitioners judge the preliminary rounds and briefs. New York-area bankruptcy judges from around the country judge the later rounds of the competition.

St. John's Moot Court Honor Society and American Bankruptcy Institute Law Review members organize and run the competition. Additionally, they prepare the bench memo for the judges, field ghost teams, and serve as bailiffs during the competition. The competition winners, best briefs and best advocates are recognized at an awards banquet.

== Frank S. Polestino Trial Advocacy Institute (PTAI) ==
The Frank S. Polestino Trial Advocacy Institute is the mock trial program for St. John's University School of Law.

== Deans ==
- Jelani Jefferson Exum: 2024 – present
- Michael A. Simons: 2009 – 2024
- Andrew Simons (Interim/Acting): 2008 – 2009
- Mary C. Daly: 2004 – 2008
- Joseph W. Bellacosa: 2000 – 2004
- Vincent C. Alexander: 1999 – 2000
- Brian Z. Tamanaha: 1998 – 1999
- Rudolph C. Hasl: 1991 – 1998
- Patrick J. Rohan: 1981 – 1991
- John J. Murphy: 1970 – 1981
- Harold F. McNiece: 1961 – 1970
- Rev. William F. Cahill (Acting): 1960 – 1961

== Notable alumni ==
=== Government ===
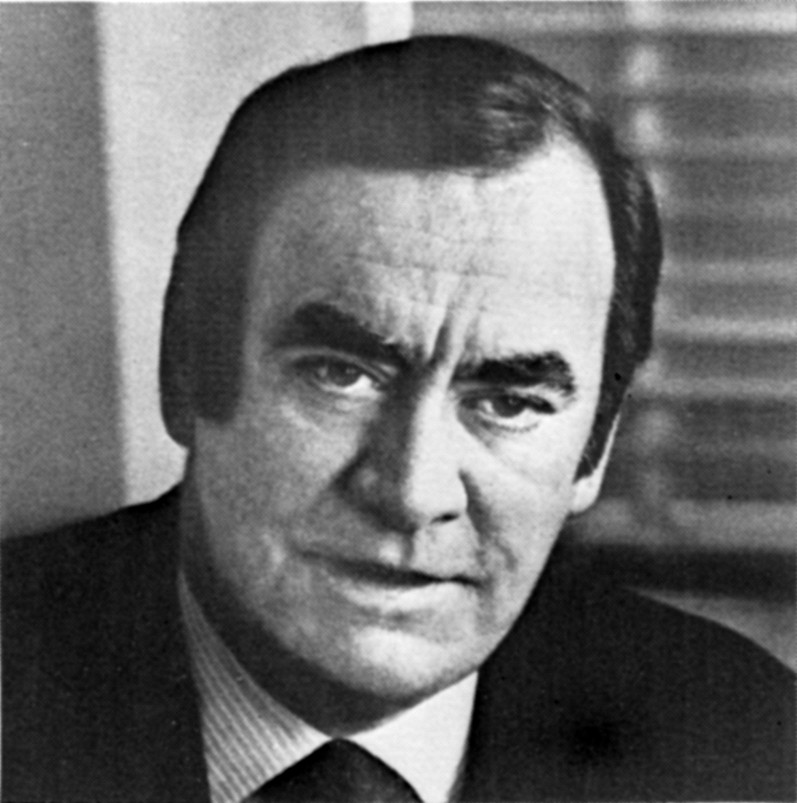
Hugh Carey

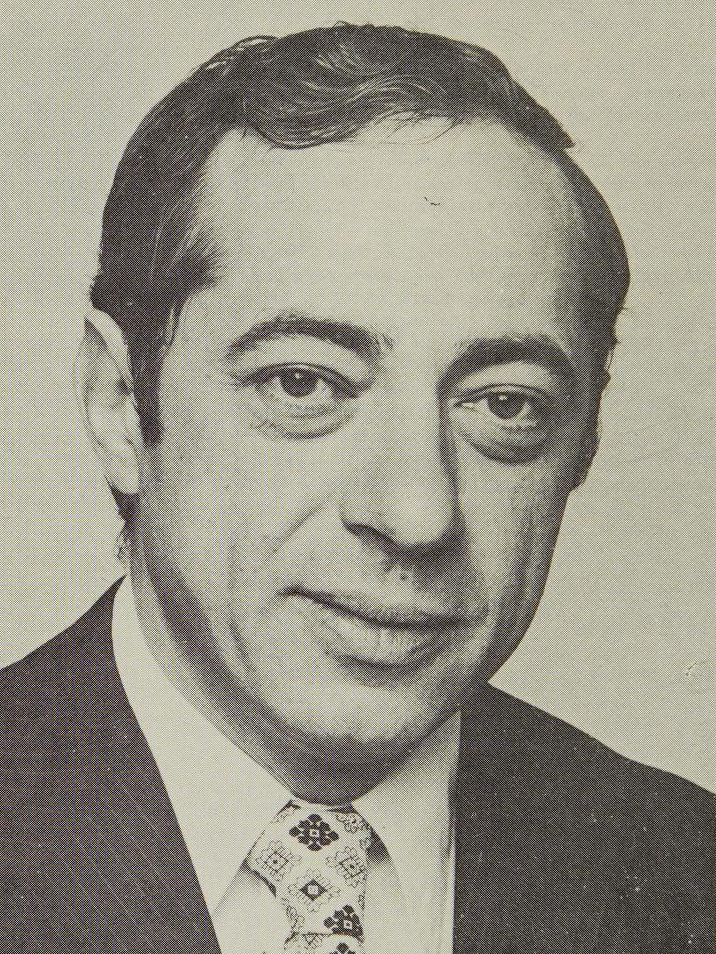
Mario Cuomo

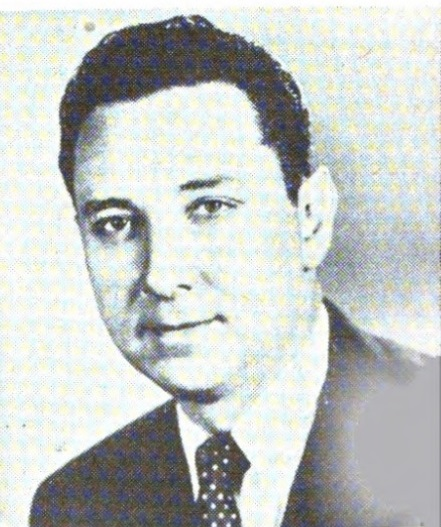
Jacob H. Gilbert

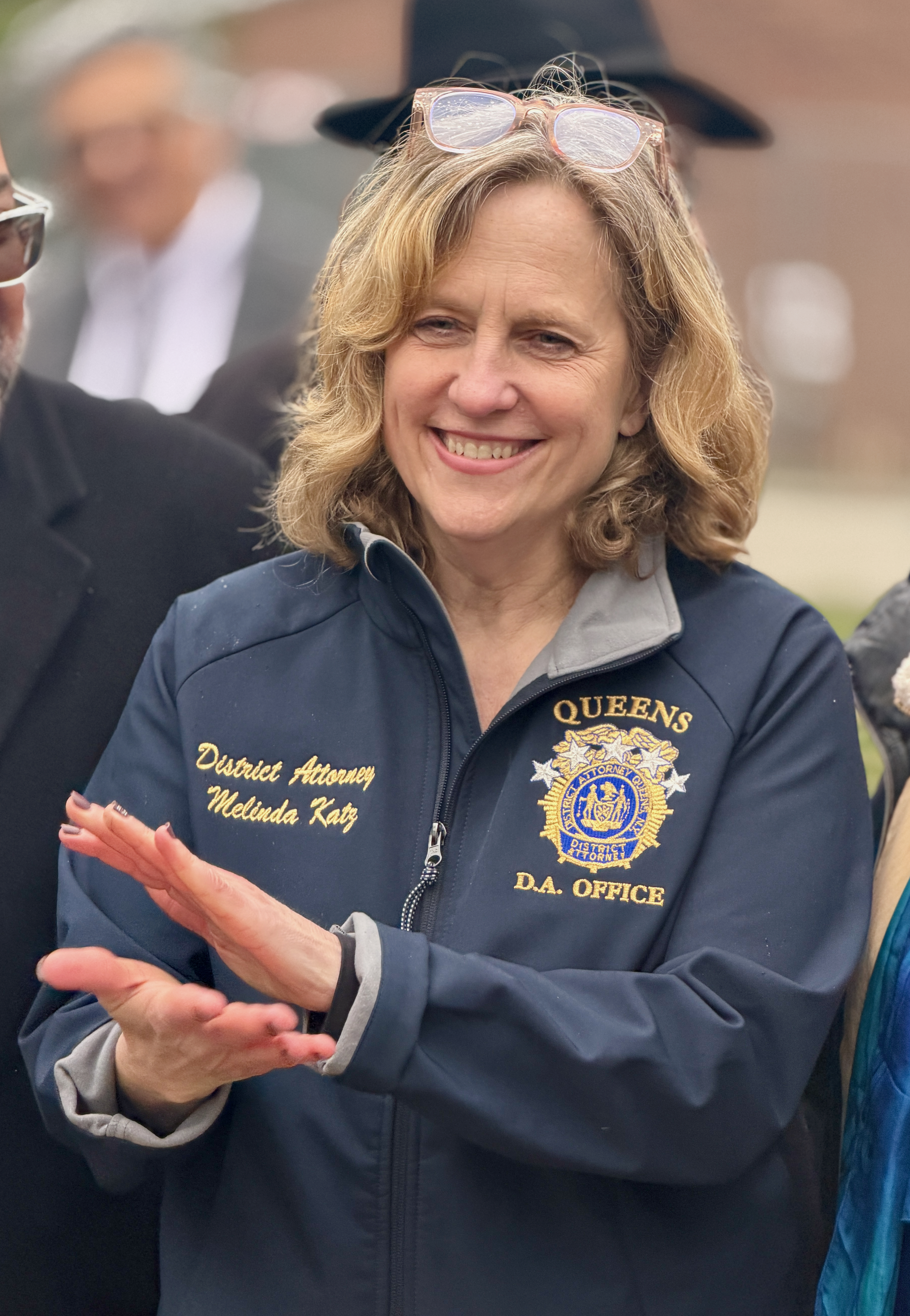
Melinda Katz

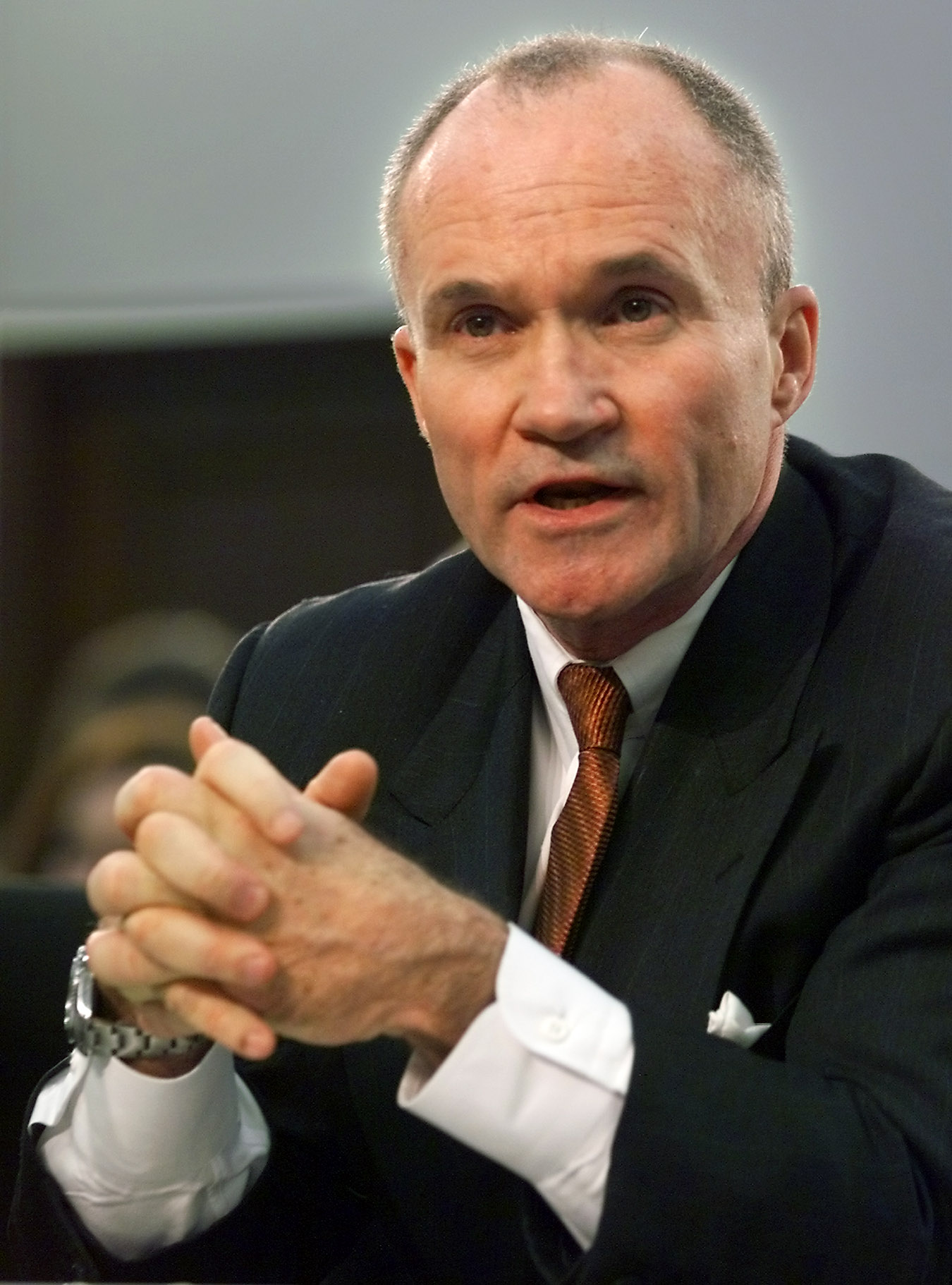
Raymond W. Kelly

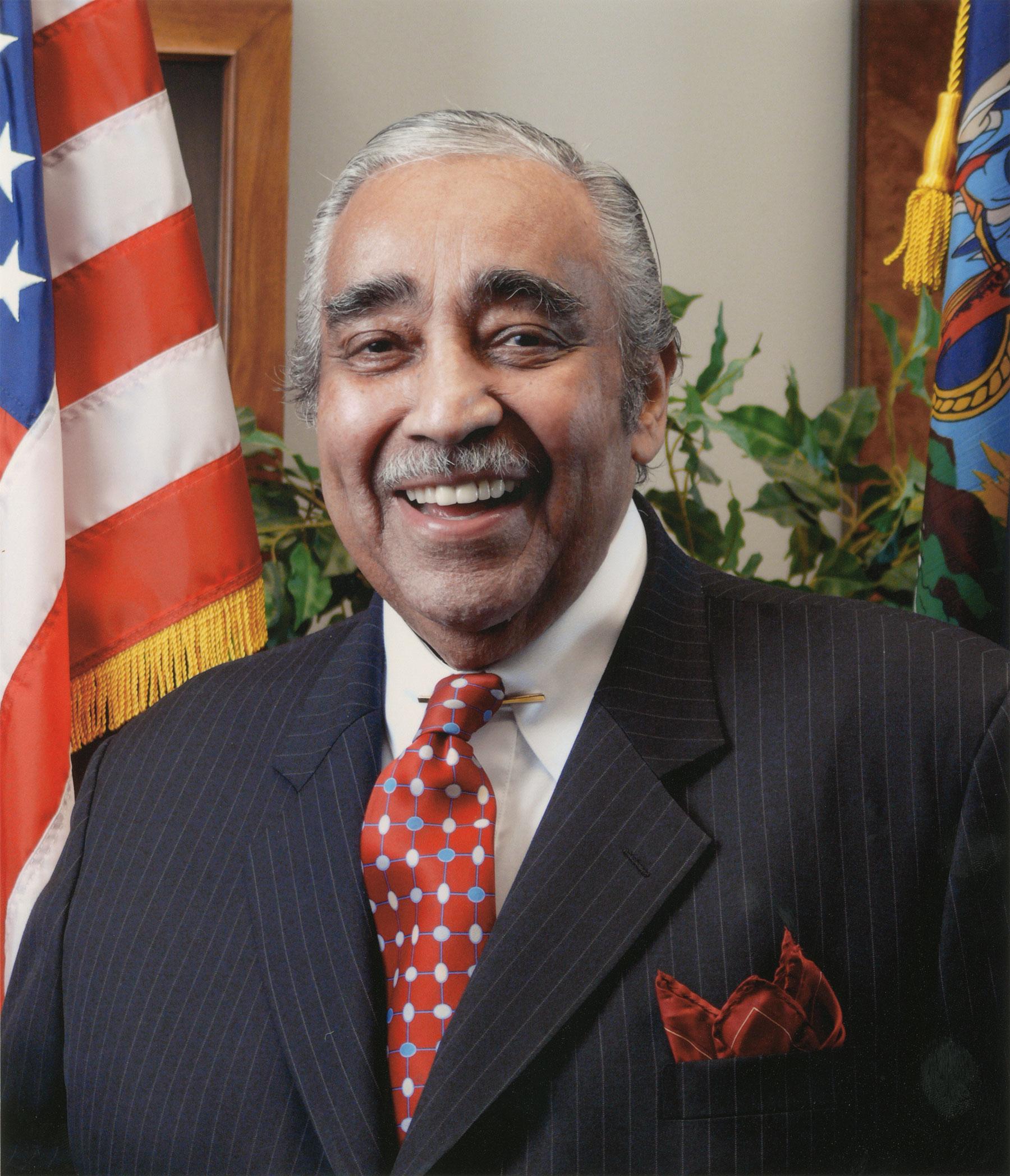
Charles Rangel

- Joseph P. Addabbo, US representative from New York (1961–86)
- Howard E. Babbush (1941– 2004), Member of the New York State Senate
- Michael Balboni, former deputy secretary of state, public safety – New York State, former NYS senator
- Ralph Elihu Becker (1907–1994), U.S. Ambassador to Honduras
- Sam Berger, Member of the New York State Assembly
- Alessandra Biaggi (born 1986), New York State senator
- Jeremiah B. Bloom, (1913-1983), member of the New York City Council, member of the New York State Senate
- Albert H. Bosch, former US representative
- Leonard B. Boudin, civil rights attorney, noted for his representation of anti-war activists during the Vietnam war era.
- Ron Brown, former US secretary of commerce and chairman of the Democratic National Committee
- Hugh Carey (1919–2011), governor of New York
- Gregory W. Carman, former chief judge and judge, US Court of International Trade; former US representative
- William J. Casey (1913–1987), director of Central Intelligence and chairman of the US Securities and Exchange Commission
- Alfred C. Cerullo III, former New York City commissioner and council member, professional actor in theater and television
- Mario Cuomo (1932-2015), governor of New York
- Jennifer S. DeSena – civic leader and politician serving as the 38th town supervisor of North Hempstead, New York.
- George Deukmejian, former governor of California and California Attorney General
- Dominick L. DiCarlo, former US assistant secretary of state for international narcotics matters and chief judge of the US Court of International Trade
- Richard Donoghue, US attorney for the Eastern District of New York.
- Moses J. Epstein (c. 1911 –1960), Member of the New York State Assembly
- Alexander Farrelly, former governor of the US Virgin Islands
- John J. Ghezzi, former NYS secretary of state
- Jacob H. Gilbert (1920 –1981), Member of the U.S. House of Representatives, member of the New York State Senate, member of the New York State Assembly
- Frank A. Gulotta, Nassau County district attorney and NYS Appellate Division judge
- George Grasso, former NYPD First Deputy Police Commissioner and Judge
- Lester Holtzman (1913-2002), US representative and NY Supreme Court judge
- Charles Hynes, former district attorney of Kings County, New York (Brooklyn)
- Melinda Katz (born 1965), district attorney of Queens, New York, former borough president of Queens, NYC council member, and NYS Assembly member
- Raymond W. Kelly, former New York City Police Department commissioner
- Henry J. Latham, former US representative
- Albert B. Lewis (1925–2021), member of the New York State Senate, New York State Superintendent of Insurance
- Jack Martins, NYS senator
- A. Frederick Meyerson (1918 –2009), Member of the New York State Senate, judge on the New York Supreme Court
- Irving Mosberg (1908–1973), Member of the New York State Senate
- Basil Paterson, former New York State secretary of state and NYS senator
- Harvey Pitt (1945-2023), chairman of US Securities and Exchange Commission
- Rose Pugliese, minority leader Colorado state legislature
- Dan Quart (born 1972), former Member of the New York State Assembly
- Charles B. Rangel, US representative
- John J. Santucci (1931-2016), district attorney of Queens
- Irwin Steingut (1893–1952), 107th Speaker of the New York State Assembly
- Stanley Steingut (1920–1989), 115th Speaker of the New York State Assembly
- Paul Vallone, New York City council member

=== Judges ===
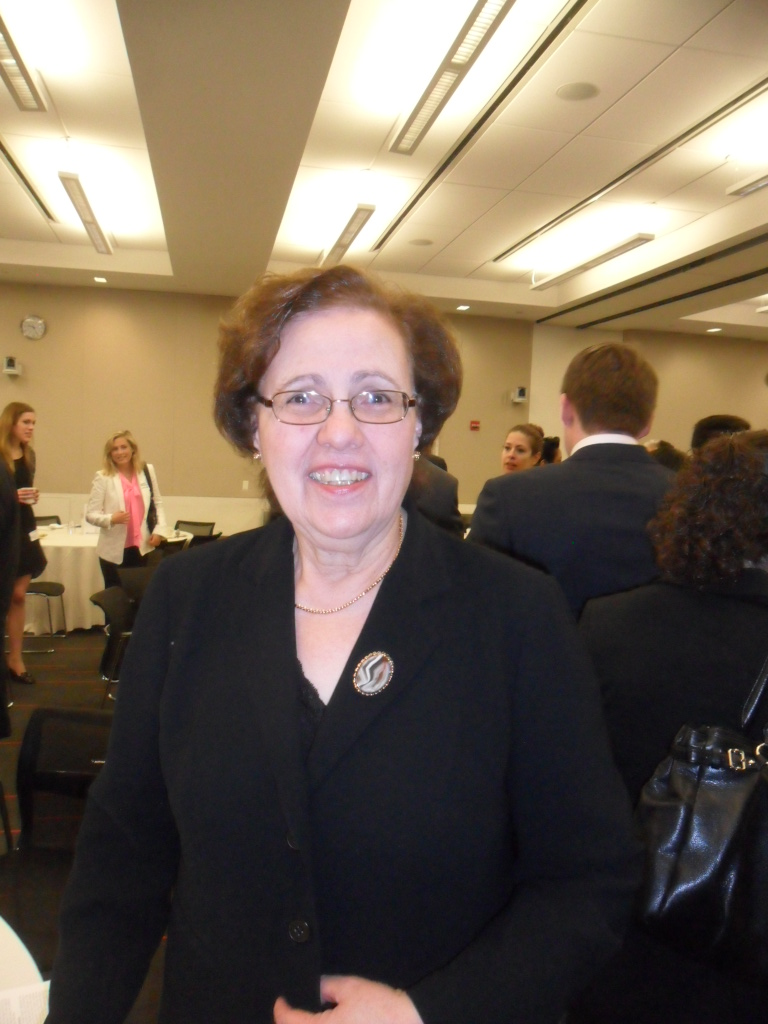
Carmen Beauchamp Ciparick

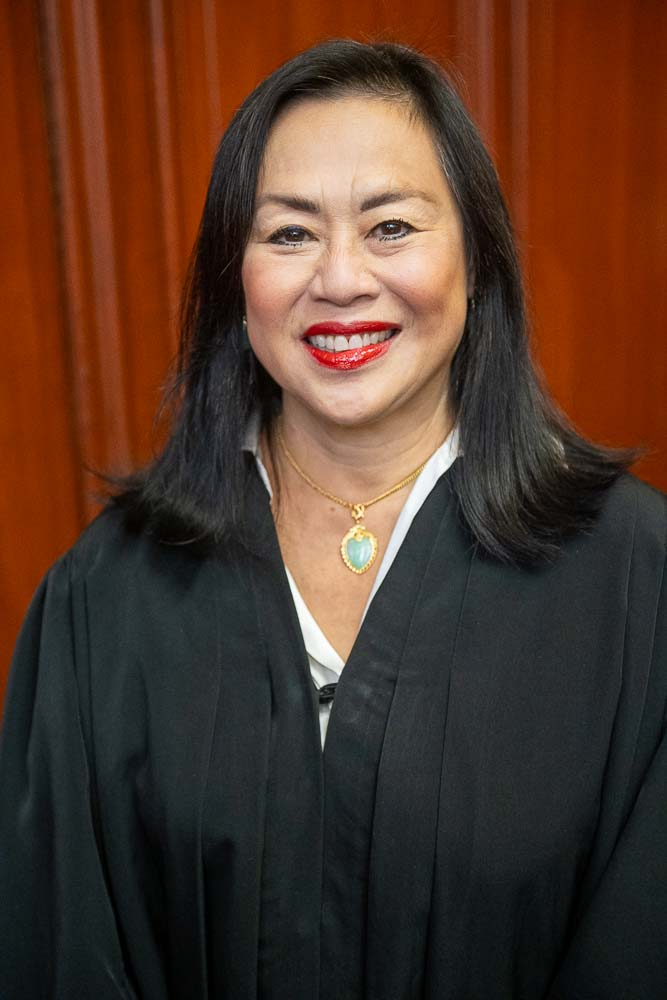
Nancy J. Waples

- Harold Birns, former associate justice, Appellate Division of the New York Supreme Court, First Judicial Department
- P. Kevin Castel, judge, US District Court for the Southern District of New York
- Raymond J. Dearie, judge and former chief judge, US District Court for the Eastern District of New York; Judge, United States Foreign Intelligence Surveillance Court
- Stanley R. Chesler (born1947) , Senior Judge of the United States District Court for the District of New Jersey
- Carmen Beauchamp Ciparick, former judge, New York Court of Appeals
- Janet DiFiore, Chief Judge, New York Court of Appeals
- Patricia DiMango, former Justice, New York Supreme Court
- John Francis Dooling Jr., former judge, U.S. District Court for the Eastern District of New York
- Conrad B. Duberstein, former chief judge of the US Bankruptcy Court for the Eastern District of New York
- Randall T. Eng, presiding justice, New York Supreme Court, Appellate Division
- Theodore T. Jones Jr., former Judge, New York Court of Appeals
- Guy James Mangano, former Presiding Justice of New York Supreme Court, Appellate Division
- Edward D. Re, former Chief Judge and Judge, US Court of International Trade
- Joanna Seybert, Judge, US District Court for the Eastern District of New York
- Samuel A. Spiegel, former Justice, New York Supreme Court
- John E. Sprizzo, former Judge, US District Court for the Southern District of New York
- Nancy J. Waples, Associate Justice, Supreme Court of Vermont

=== Media and entertainment ===
- Dane Clark (1912–1998), actor
- Norman Krasna (1909 –1984), screenwriter, playwright, producer, and film director
- Herbert Mitgang (1920–2013) , author, editor, journalist, playwright, and producer of television news documentaries.
- Michael Tucci, actor
- Terence Winter, Emmy Award-winning screenwriter and producer of television and film

=== Sports ===
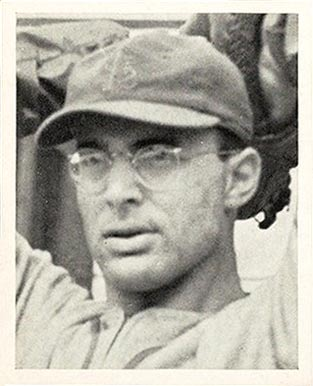
Sam Nahem

- Mickey Fisher (1904/05–1963), basketball coach
- Michael Goldberg (1943–2017), executive director of the National Basketball Coaches Association
- Sam Nahem (1915–2004), Major League Baseball pitcher
- Elliot Steinmetz (born 1980), basketball coach
- Elaine Weddington Steward, lawyer working for Major League Baseball
- Fred Thompson (1933–2019), Hall of Fame track and field coach

=== Other ===
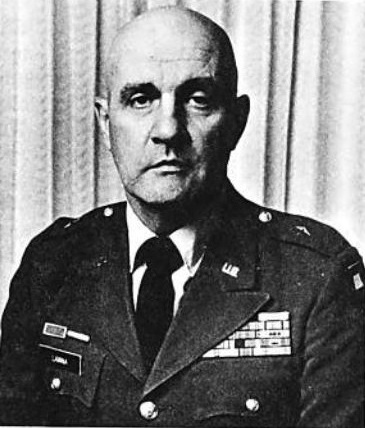
Vincent W. Lanna

- Anthony Bevilacqua, Roman Catholic Cardinal and Archbishop of Philadelphia, Pennsylvania
- Leonard Boudin, lawyer and civil rights activist
- Joseph Cammarata, lawyer and partner at Chaikin, Sherman, Cammarata & Siegel, P.C.; represented Paula Jones
- Clarence Dunnaville, lawyer and civil rights activist
- Vincent W. Lanna, (1925–2010) (LL.B. 1952), US Army major general
- Kate O'Beirne, journalist, political commentator, and magazine editor
- Ian Schrager, hotelier and real estate developer
- David D. Siegel, law professor, legal scholar and commentator

== See also ==
- Law of New York
