= Conrad B. Duberstein =

American judge (c. 1915–2005)

Conrad B. Duberstein (c. 1915 – November 18, 2005) was for many years the Chief Judge of the United States Bankruptcy Court for the Eastern District of New York. A decorated World War II veteran, he became a partner at Otterbourg, Steindler, Houston & Rosen and chaired the firm's creditor's rights department before being nominated to the bench.

Born in Bronx, New York, Duberstein graduated from Brooklyn College in 1938, and received a J.D. from St. John's University School of Law in 1942. He served in the United States Army during World War II, from 1943 to 1945, in the 91st Infantry Division of the 5th Army, serving in combat in Italy. His military honors included a Bronze Star Medal, a Purple Heart, and a Combat Infantryman Badge. Following the war, he was in private practice in the area of bankruptcy until 1981, first with Schwartz, Rudin and Duberstein, and then with Otterbourg, Steindler, Houston and Rosen. In 1981, he began his service in the federal bankruptcy court, where he was Chief Judge for over twenty years, from 1984 until his death, in 2005, in New York.

The Conrad B. Duberstein Moot Court Competition is named for him, and the Conrad B. Duberstein United States Bankruptcy Courthouse was renamed in his honor in 2009.
