= Fred Thompson (coach) =

American lawyer and track & field coach (1933–2019)

Fred Thompson (May 21, 1933 – January 22, 2019) was an American lawyer and track and field coach. A graduate of Boys High School, where he was a track athlete, City College of New York and St. John's University School of Law, he was an Assistant Attorney General of the State of New York from 1967 to 1969. As a coach he founded the Atoms Track Club in 1963.

Thompson died from complications of Alzheimer's disease at his home in Brooklyn, New York, on January 22, 2019. That same year, he was elected into the National Track and Field Hall of Fame.

== Athletics coaching career ==
Prior to Title IX, athletic opportunities for boys were plentiful, while girls were left out, particularly at the scholastic level. Out of frustration, Thompson created a program in a Bedford-Stuyvesant community center in Brooklyn. His team of 40–50 girls, age 9 and up, practiced in hallways and jumped fences into schoolyards after dark in order to train; later, the Pratt Institute made facilities available. In 1974, Thompson founded the Colgate Women's Games.

Among Thompson's success stories were Olympic silver medalist Cheryl Toussaint; Gold and Silver medalist Diane Dixon, who was also two time World Indoor Champion; and silver medalist Grace Jackson who finished second to Florence Griffith-Joyner's 200 meter world record. In 1988, Thompson was a coach for the U.S. Olympic Team.
