= Haggai Carmon =

Israeli-American writer and lawyer

- חגי כרמון
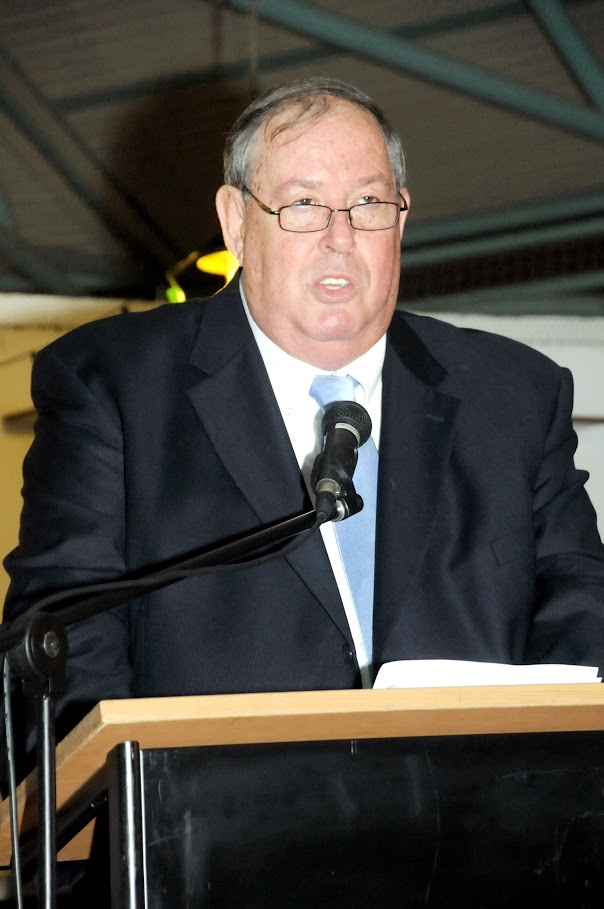
- Occupations: attorney, author, columnist
- Website: www.haggaicarmon.com

Haggai Carmon (Hebrew: חגי כרמון) is an attorney, author of intelligence thrillers, and legal advice columnist. Carmon represented the United States in Israeli civil litigation (1985–2016) and acted as an outside legal counsel to the U.S. Embassy in Tel Aviv, Israel, and the U.S. Consulate General in Jerusalem. For twenty years (1985–2005) he worked for U.S. federal agencies to conduct intelligence gathering, a task he performed under cover in more than thirty countries.

== Early life ==
Carmon grew up in Tel Aviv. His father was a bank CEO, and wrote books about poetry and Eastern philosophy. Carmon graduated Tel Aviv University Law School in 1981 cum laude and went into the international business. During this period, he became an adviser to Labor Party leader Shimon Peres. When he left Israel to pursue a master's degree in International Law, Government and Politics from St. John's University in New York, Peres asked him to be the Labor Party's chief delegate to the US. He was named as a special envoy to the Philippines in 1986. In 1985 he became an outside contractor to the Department of Justice, combining investigations with litigation.

== Career ==
Carmon heads Carmon & Carmon, an international law firm where his team specializes in asset recovery, fraud investigation and litigation, and cross border disputes.

In 2014 Carmon was appointed Honorary Consul of Estonia in Israel.

Carmon has done work exposing the fraudulent activities of binary options firms that have laundered money, and helped recover millions for victims who lost money. He is quoted as comparing the method that binary options companies use to layer their corporate structure to "structures seen only in espionage organizations or among world-class money launderers or terrorist organizations."

Carmon spent 20 years working as an undercover investigator/litigator, traveling to over 30 countries to collect intelligence for the U.S. Government. About the experience, he has said, "during my twenty years of undercover work for the U.S Department of Justice and other federal agencies, I have experienced adventure, fear, and most of the time, a great sense of achievement." He has also said, "obviously, in my years working for the U.S. Department of Justice and other federal agencies, I could not share the hair-raising aspects of my work with anyone but my supervisors, and some adventures not even with them. Sadly, many of these events, which are sometimes more fascinating and breathtaking than the best fiction I have ever read, will never see the light of day."

== Books ==
Carmon has written five spy thrillers, telling the stories of the character Dan Gordon, a former Mossad agent having adventures around the world to gather intelligence on behalf of the U.S. government. His novels are based on his experiences helping the United States track down fugitives traveling worldwide.

He began his writing career with the book Triple Identity, which he started during an assignment collecting intelligence on an organized crime group in Northern Europe. He was encouraged by his supervisor David Epstein, who was positively critical of the writing in his reports, saying "because of the way you present the facts, they read like a thriller."

In his introduction to Carmon's Defection Games thriller, Department of Justice executive David Epstein wrote regarding Carmon's litigation skills: "Haggai was hard to beat - winning all cases for the U.S. government." Separately, Epstein wrote, "U.S. Government agencies have assigned him with the worldwide responsibility (except for the U.S.) of complex multi-national and multi-million dollar cases which required sensitive investigative work in more than 30 foreign countries. Mr. Carmon has traveled internationally frequently on official U.S. Government business. His achievements in gathering intelligence have been essential and invaluable for the United States.”

Carmon wrote Foreign Judgments in Israel, Recognition and Enforcement, an international law textbook, published by the Israel Bar Association. A second and extended edition was published in 2021 by Perlstein-Genosar with an introduction by the Hon. Eliezer Rivlin, Deputy Chief Justice of the Israeli Supreme Court. The book was cited in 31 Israeli court cases, including 10 by the Supreme Court. The book was translated into English and was published by Springer. Carmon has written Remedies in Cross Border Litigation published by Perlstein-Genosar with an introduction by the Hon. Hanan Melcer, Deputy Chief Justice of the Israeli Supreme Court'.

Carmon has published articles on espionage, Iran and Middle Eastern affairs.

== Bibliography ==
- Defection Games (2013) ISBN 978-1-4778-4843-2
- Triangle Of Deception (2009) ISBN 978-0-8439-6192-8
- The Chameleon Conspiracy (2009) ISBN 978-0-8439-6191-1
- The Red Syndrome (2006)
- Triple Identity (2005)
