= Joe Mooney (groundskeeper) =

American groundskeeper (1930–2020)

- Born: September 6, 1930; Dunmore, Pennsylvania, U.S.
- Died: November 29, 2020 (aged 90); Wakefield, Massachusetts, U.S.
- Occupation: Groundskeeper
- Notable work: Boston Red Sox Hall of Fame (2012); MLB Groundskeepers Hall of Fame (2015)

Joe Mooney (September 6, 1930 – November 29, 2020) was an American groundskeeper who worked for the Boston Red Sox of Major League Baseball (MLB).

Born in Dunmore, Pennsylvania, Mooney began his career as a youngster by serving as a clubhouse boy and assistant groundskeeper from 1948 through 1951 for the Double-A Scranton Red Sox. In the mid-1950s, he was groundskeeper for the Triple-A Louisville Colonels. In the late 1950s, he was groundskeeper for the Triple-A Minneapolis Millers.

He went on to work at D.C. Stadium, later renamed RFK Stadium, during the time that Vince Lombardi coached the NFL's Washington Redskins and Ted Williams managed MLB's Washington Senators; Mooney was hired by the Senators in December 1960. In February 1969, someone stole home plate from RFK stadium, and a UPI photo showing Mooney and a security guard investigating the theft appeared in various newspapers.

Mooney joined the Red Sox after the 1970 MLB season, upon recommendation by Williams to the team's owner, Tom Yawkey. Mooney became the head groundskeeper at Fenway Park and held that post for the next 31 years. In October 1975, he again appeared in various newspapers when Game 6 of the World Series had to be postponed three times, in consideration of rain and the condition of the field at Fenway Park.

During his long stint with the Red Sox, Mooney became a legend at Fenway while contributing in different functions as Superintendent of Grounds, Park, and Maintenance. He was succeeded by Dave Mellor in January 2001. Mooney was given the title of Director of Grounds Emeritus, and was enshrined in the Boston Red Sox Hall of Fame in 2012. In 2015, Mooney was inducted into the MLB Groundskeepers Hall of Fame.

== Death ==
Mooney died at his residence on November 29, 2020.
