= Patrick A. Malone =

American lawyer

Patrick A. Malone (born 1951) is a trial lawyer and author based in Washington, D.C. Malone co-developed a trial advocacy method called "Rules of the Road".

== Advocacy Method ==
Malone co-authored Rules of the Road: A Plaintiff Lawyer's Guide to Proving Liability, with Rick Friedman, which was published by Trial Guides in 2006. Since then, the techniques described in the book have been the subject of national and regional seminars for trial lawyers, sponsored by the American Association for Justice (AAJ) -- formerly known as the Association of Trial Lawyers of America (ATLA) -- the largest organization for plaintiffs' attorneys in the United States. An expanded second edition of the book was published in 2010. The publisher describes the book as "America's bestselling text on proving liability." The phrase "Rules of the Road" has been trademarked.

In their book, Friedman and Malone posit that civil defendants defeat meritorious lawsuits by three main techniques -- "complexity, confusion and ambiguity" - and that plaintiff advocates can prepare more persuasive cases by developing case-specific "rules" that clarify the core liability issues in the case.

In 2012, Malone was the lead author of a follow-up book, Winning Medical Malpractice Cases With the Rules of the Road Technique. In the same year, the AAJ added a special annual two-day seminar on "rules of the road" as applied to medical malpractice cases.

In 2016, Malone's book The Fearless Cross-Examiner: Win the Witness, Win the Case was published. This book aimed to overturn standard advice on how trial lawyers should conduct cross-examination and instead advocated a more analytic and adaptable approach.

== Notable cases ==
In Benedi v. McNeil-P.P.C., Inc. (E.D. Va.), a federal jury in Alexandria, Virginia, found in 1994 that the manufacturer of Tylenol should pay Malone's client $8 million for failing to warn on its label about the drug's ability to destroy the liver in ordinary doses in alcohol drinkers. The verdict was affirmed by the Fourth Circuit The Boston Globe called it one of the top ten lawsuit verdicts against pharmaceutical companies.

In Semsker v. Lockshin, a state court jury in Rockville, Maryland, awarded the family of a deceased attorney $5.8 million against a dermatology practice that had failed to timely diagnose the attorney's melanoma. The trial court agreed with Malone's argument that the state's limitation on malpractice damages should not apply to this case. However, the state's highest court, the Maryland Court of Appeals, reversed and ordered the verdict reduced to account for the statutory cap after hearing from amici curiae, including the state medical society and the American Medical Association.

Malone represented the plaintiff in Goldberg v. Boone, a Maryland medical malpractice in which the plaintiff suffered brain injury during a procedure to remove a cholesteatoma from the ear. Reversing the intermediate appellate court, the Maryland court of appeals agreed with Malone's position and established the right of Maryland patients to sue a surgeon for lack of informed consent in not advising that other more experienced surgeons were available for a particular procedure.

== Career ==
Before attending law school, Malone was a medical writer and investigative reporter for the Miami Herald. He was a finalist for a 1980 Pulitzer Prize for "Dangerous Doctors", a series of articles he co-authored. He earned a J.D. from Yale Law School in 1984.

Malone was a law clerk to Judge Gerhard Gesell of the U.S. District Court for the District of Columbia from 1984 to 1985. Malone worked for 22 years for the law firm of Stein, Mitchell & Mezines (now Stein, Mitchell, Muse & Cipollone, LLP).

Malone also wrote The Life You Save: Nine Steps to Finding the Best Medical Care—and Avoiding the Worst, which helps patients and their friends and family insure that they receive the best medical care in today's healthcare system.

== List of Publications ==
- Rules of the Road: A Plaintiff Lawyer's Guide to Proving Liability
- The Life You Save: Nine Steps to Finding the Best Medical Care-and Avoiding the Worst
- Winning Medical Malpractice Cases With the Rules of the Road Technique
- The Fearless Cross-Examiner: Win the Witness, Win the Case

== Legal Articles ==
- "Paying It Forward by Pressing for Safety Changes", Trial, June 2014.
- "Unethical Secret Settlements: Just Say No", (by Patrick Malone & Jon Bauer), Trial, September 2010.
- "Medical Malpractice in Managing Diabetes" Trial, March 2004
- "Working with Experts in the Daubert Era," Trial, September 2003
- "The Role of FDA Approval in Drug Cases," Trial, November 1998
- "Medical Authority and Infanticide," Journal of Law and Health, Vol. 1, No. 1, 1985.
- "Lessons for Trial Lawyers from Lincoln's Second Inaugural Address" Litigation, Volume 34, Number 4, Summer 2008
- "'You Have the Right to Remain Silent': Miranda after twenty years", American Scholar (1986), pp. 55, 367-80.
