= Mickey Fisher (basketball) =

American basketball coach

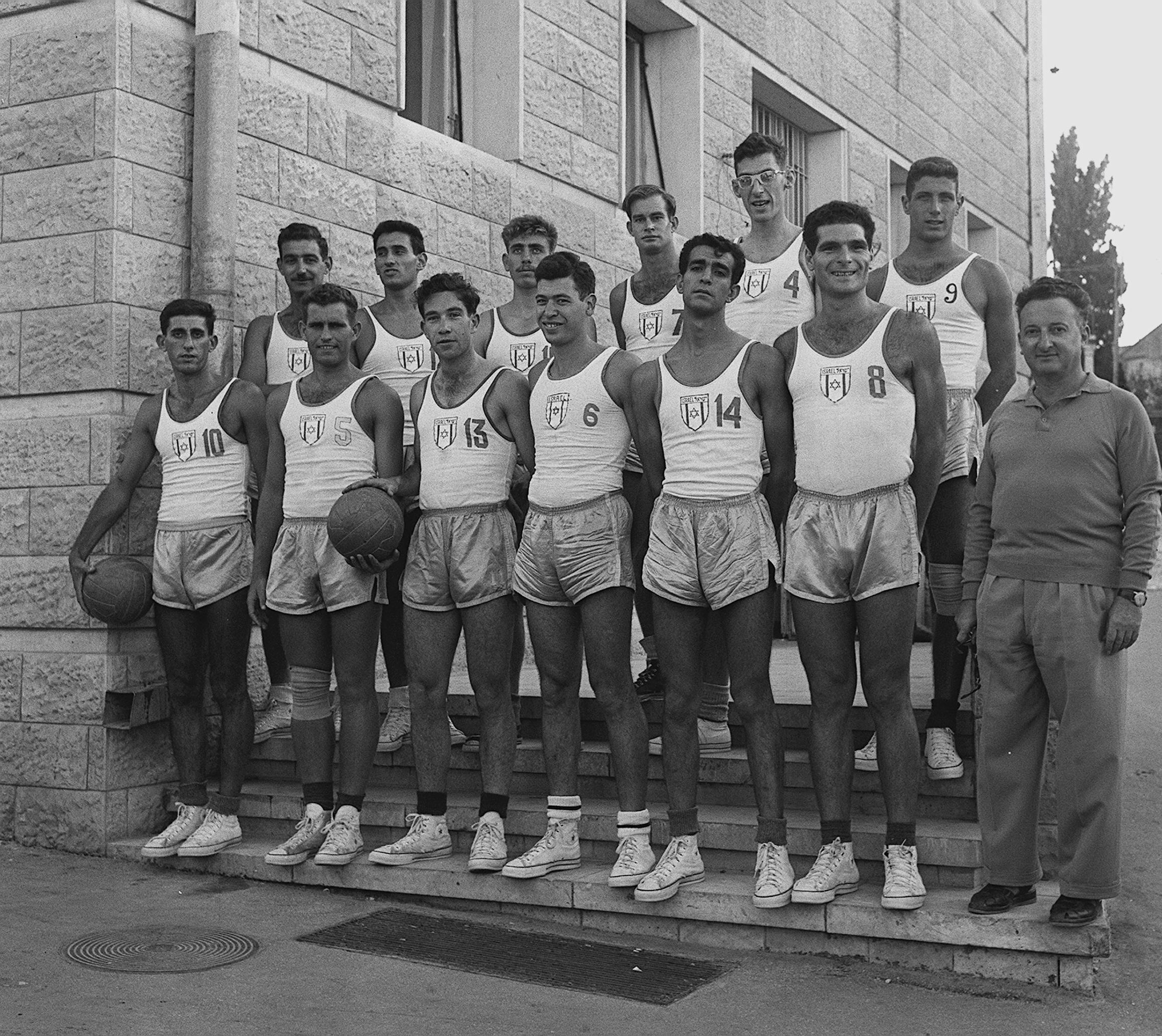
- Fisher (first row, on the right), with the Israeli national basketball team, 1960

Personal information
- Born: 1904/1905 Brooklyn, New York, U.S.
- Died: April 15, 1963 (aged 58) Brooklyn, New York, U.S.
- Listed height: 5 ft 8 in (1.73 m)

Career information
- High school: Boys High School
- College: St. Johns University; New York University

Morris Meyer "Mickey" Fisher (1904/1905 – April 15, 1963) was an American basketball coach. Fisher was the basketball coach of the Boys High School Kangaroos in Brooklyn for 23 years and of the Israel national basketball team preparing it for the 1960 Summer Olympics, and was the Brandeis University acting athletic director.

The New York Post described him as "The incomparable Mickey Fisher." Newsday and The Jewish Post described Fisher as "legendary." The New York Times called him "the most successful high school basketball coach" in New York City.

== Biography ==
Fisher was a native of Brooklyn, New York, lived in West Newton, Massachusetts, and was Jewish. He was 5 ft 8 in (1.73 m) tall. He attended Boys High School in Brooklyn, was on its soccer team in 1921, and graduated in 1922.

He graduated from St. Johns University ('28 L) with two law degrees, and from New York University with a Master of Arts degree. In World War II, he entered the US Army as a private, and rose to captain. He and his wife, Hermine, had a son, Philip. He practiced law briefly.

Fisher was the basketball coach of the Boys High School Kangaroos in Brooklyn for 23 years in the 1940s, 1950s, and into the 1960s. Five of the teams he coached won the New York City Public School Athletic League basketball championship, four of them in the six years from 1957 to 1962. In one stretch his teams won 60 games, and lost 2. Among those players he coached were future NBA players Sihugo Green (#1 pick in the 1956 NBA draft), Lenny Wilkens (Hall of Famer), and Connie Hawkins (Hall of Famer), as well as future Major League Baseball All Star player Tommy Davis (two-time NL batting champion). At the same time, Fisher was known for guiding and developing his players, taking interest in their schoolwork, home lives, and friends.

He took a one-year leave of absence in 1960, as he was sent to Israel by the US State Department to train the Israel national basketball team and to coach it in the 1960 Summer Olympics in Rome.

In 1962, Fisher became the Brandeis University acting athletic airector. In April 1963 he died at 58 years of age in Brooklyn Jewish Hospital of a heart attack.

In 1994 he was inducted into the New York City Basketball Hall of Fame.
