= Hidden curriculum =

Unintended learning while attending formal education

A hidden curriculum is a set of lessons "which are learned but not openly intended" to be taught in school such as the norms, values, and beliefs conveyed in both the classroom and social environment. In many cases, it occurs as a result of social interactions and expectations. The term hidden curriculum is sometimes seen as synonymous with, or a subset of, the implicit curriculum.

Any type of learning experience may include unintended lessons. However, the concept of a hidden curriculum often refers to knowledge gained specifically in primary and secondary school settings. In these scenarios the school strives, as a positive goal, for equal intellectual development among its students, but the hidden curriculum reinforces existing social inequalities through the education of students according to their class and social status. The distribution of knowledge among students is mirrored by the unequal distribution of cultural capital.

The hidden curriculum can also be seen as a set of norms and behaviors that are not explicitly taught, and students with limited social awareness, such as students with autism spectrum disorder, may not pick up on these norms without having them be explained directly. This set of norms and behaviors also regards the culture of an environment that is unique to that environment, for example the norms and expectations of an office space would vary from those of a classroom.

Breaktime is also a source of hidden curriculum in schooling. Students have more freedom of movement and interaction during these periods; this can facilitate unspoken lessons concerning clique formation and bullying, choice of recreation, self-expression, and conflict resolution.

== History of research ==
Early educationalists explicitly endorsed the idea that education should be about the preservation of the social privileges, interests, and knowledge of one group within the population at the expense of less powerful groups. Over time, fewer people have subscribed explicitly to this view, yet education systems frequently continue to entrench social hierarchies. The concept of the hidden curriculum was one key effort to explain how education enables this socially conservative outcome and to illustrate the role that schools play in socialization.

Although he did not use the term, John Dewey explored the hidden curriculum of education in his early twentieth-century works, especially in his classic Democracy and Education. Dewey saw patterns evolving and trends developing in public schools which lent themselves to his pro-democratic perspectives. His work was quickly rebutted by educational theorist George Counts, whose 1929 book Dare the School Build a New Social Order? challenged Dewey's works. Counts claimed that Dewey hypothesized a singular path through which all young people travelled in order to become adults without considering the reactive, adaptive, and multifaceted nature of learning. Counts emphasized that this characteristic of learning caused many educators to slant their perspectives, practices, and assessments of student performance in directions that affected their students drastically. Counts' examinations were expanded on by Charles A. Beard and, later, Myles Horton who created what became the Highlander Folk School in Tennessee.

The phrase "hidden curriculum" was coined by Philip W. Jackson (Life In Classrooms, 1968). He argued that we need to understand "education" as a socialization process. Shortly after Jackson's coining of the term, MIT's Benson Snyder published The Hidden Curriculum, which addresses the question of why students—even, or especially, the most gifted—turn away from education. Snyder advocates the thesis that much of campus conflict and students' personal anxiety is caused by a mass of unstated academic and social norms, which thwart the students' abilities to develop independently and think creatively.

The hidden curriculum has been further explored by a number of educators. Starting with Pedagogy of the Oppressed, published in 1972, through the late 1990s, Brazilian educator Paulo Freire explored various effects of presumptive teaching on students, schools, and society as a whole. Freire's explorations were in sync with those of John Holt and Ivan Illich, each of whom were quickly identified as radical educators. Other theorists who have identified the nature of hidden curricula and hidden agendas include Neil Postman, Paul Goodman, Joel Spring, John Taylor Gatto, and others.

More recent definitions have been given by Roland Meighan ("A Sociology of Education," 1981) and Michael Haralambos ("Sociology: Themes and Perspectives," 1991). Meighan wrote, "The hidden curriculum is not taught by the school, and by any teacher... something is coming across to the pupils which may never be spoken in the English lesson or prayed about in assembly. They are picking-up an approach to living and an attitude to learning." Haralambos wrote, "The hidden curriculum consists of those things pupils learn through the experience of attending school rather than the stated educational objectives of such institutions."

Further, educational critics Henry Giroux, bell hooks, and Jonathan Kozol have also examined the effects of the hidden curriculum. Theoretical inquiries into the hidden curriculum, as cited by Henry Giroux and Anthony Penna in 1983, include for example a structural-functional view of education, a phenomenological view related to the "new" sociology of education, and a radical critical view corresponding to the neo-Marxist analysis of the theory and practice of education. The structural-functional view focuses on how norms and values are conveyed within schools and the acceptance of the idea that those norms and values are necessary for the functioning of society. The phenomenological view suggests that meaning is created through situational encounters and interactions, and it implies that knowledge is somewhat objective. The radical critical view recognizes the relationship between economic and cultural reproduction and stresses the relationships among the theory, ideology, and social practice of learning. Although the first two theories have contributed to the analysis of the hidden curriculum, the radical critical view of schooling provides the most insight. Additionally, it acknowledges the perpetuated economic and social aspects of education that are illustrated by the hidden curriculum.

Additionally, developmental psychologist Robert Kegan addressed the hidden curriculum of everyday life in his 1994 book In Over Our Heads, which focused on the relation between cognitive development and the "cognitive demands" of cultural expectations.

Professor of communication Joseph Turow, in his 2017 book The Aisles Have Eyes, used the concept to describe acculturation to massive personal data collection; he wrote, "The very activities that dismay privacy and anti-discrimination advocates are already beginning to become everyday habits in American lives, and part of Americans' cultural routines. Retailing is at the leading edge of a new hidden curriculum for American society—teaching people what they have to give up in order to get along in the twenty-first century."

== Aspects of learning ==
Various aspects of learning contribute to the success of the hidden curriculum, including practices, procedures, rules, relationships, and structures. These school-specific aspects of learning may include, but are not limited to, the social structures of the classroom, the teacher's exercise of authority, the teacher's use of language, rules governing the relationship between teachers and students, standard learning activities, textbooks, audio-visual aids, furnishings, architecture, disciplinary measures, timetables, tracking systems, and curricular priorities. Variations among these sources can create the disparities found when comparing the hidden curricula in various class and social statuses. "Every school is both an expression of a political situation and a teacher of politics."

While the actual material that students absorb through the hidden curriculum is of utmost importance, the personnel who convey it elicit special investigation. This particularly applies to the social and moral lessons conveyed by the hidden curriculum, for the moral characteristics and ideologies of teachers and other authority figures are translated into their lessons, albeit not necessarily on purpose.

These unintended learning experiences can also result from interactions between peers. Similar to interactions with authority figures, interactions amongst peers can promote moral and social ideals as well as fostering the exchange of information. Thus, these interactions are important sources of knowledge that contribute to the success of the hidden curriculum.

=== Heteronormativity ===
According to Merfat Ayesh Alsubaie, the hidden curriculum of heteronormativity is the erasure of LGBT identities in the curriculum through the privileging of heterosexual identities. In a quote from Gust Yep, heteronormativity is the "presumption and assumption that all human experience is unquestionably and automatically heterosexual". Laws such as "No Promo Homo" that prohibit the mention or teaching of LGBT identities are considered to reinforce the hidden curriculum of heteronormativity. According to Mary Preston, in addition to No Promo Homo laws, the lack of sexual education in schools removes LGBT identities from the explicit curriculum and contributes to the hidden curriculum of heteronormativity. Currently, over half of the states in the United States are not legally mandated to have any sexual education.

Depending on the cultural norm of the school, when students fall outside the heterosexual norm, other students and teachers have been shown to police them back in line with heteronormative expectations. C. J. Pascoe said policing takes place through the use of bullying behaviors such as the use of words such as "fag, queer, or dyke" which are used to shame students with identities outside the norm. Pascoe said the use of LGBT slurs forms a "Fag Discourse." The "Fag Discourse" in schools upholds heteronormativity as sacred, works to silence LGBT voices, and embeds these heteronormative ideals within the hidden curriculum.

=== Autism ===
The term "hidden curriculum" also refers to the set of social norms and skills that autistic people have to learn explicitly, but that non-autistic people learn automatically, such as theory of mind. Another aspect of the "hidden curriculum" often taught to autistic students is that of labeling their emotions in an effort to help students avoid alexithymia.

== Function ==
Although the hidden curriculum conveys a great deal of knowledge to its students, the inequality promoted through its disparities among classes and social statuses often invokes a negative connotation. For example, Pierre Bourdieu asserts that education-related capital must be accessible to promote academic achievement. The effectiveness of schools becomes limited when these forms of capital are unequally distributed. Since the hidden curriculum is considered to be a form of education-related capital, it promotes this ineffectiveness of schools as a result of its unequal distribution. As a means of social control, the hidden curriculum promotes the acceptance of a social destiny without promoting rational and reflective consideration.

According to Elizabeth Vallance, the functions of hidden curriculum include "the inculcation of values, political socialization, training in obedience and docility, the perpetuation of traditional class structure-functions that may be characterized generally as social control". The hidden curriculum can also be associated with the reinforcement of social inequality, as evidenced by the development of different relationships to capital based on the types of work and work-related activities assigned to students varying by social class.

Although the hidden curriculum has negative connotations, it is not inherently negative, and the tacit factors that are involved can potentially exert a positive developmental force on students. Some educational approaches, such as democratic education, actively seek to minimize, make explicit, and/or reorient the hidden curriculum in such a way that it has a positive developmental impact on students. Similarly, in the fields of environmental education and education for sustainable development, there has been some advocacy for making school environments more natural and sustainable, such that the tacit developmental forces that these physical factors exert on students can become positive factors in their development as environmental citizens.

== Higher education and tracking ==
While studies on the hidden curriculum mostly focus on fundamental primary and secondary education, higher education also feels the effects of this latent knowledge. For example, gender biases become present in specific fields of study; the quality of and experiences associated with prior education become more significant; and differences in class, gender, and race become more evident at higher levels of education.

Additionally, tracking is another aspect of the hidden curriculum that plays a major role in the development of students. This method of imposing educational and career paths upon students at young ages relies on a variety of factors such as class and status in order to reinforce socioeconomic differences. Children tend to be placed on tracks that guide them towards socioeconomic occupations similar to that of their parents, without real considerations for their personal strengths and weaknesses. As students advance through the educational system, they follow their tracks by completing these predetermined courses.

== See also ==
- Another Brick In The Wall
- Bias in curricula
- Curriculum
- Curriculum studies
- Dumbing Us Down
- Educational assessment
- Educational inequality
- False consciousness
- Ideology and Ideological State Apparatuses
- Tacit knowledge
- Youth voice in education
