= 1954 New York gubernatorial election =

- November 2, 1954
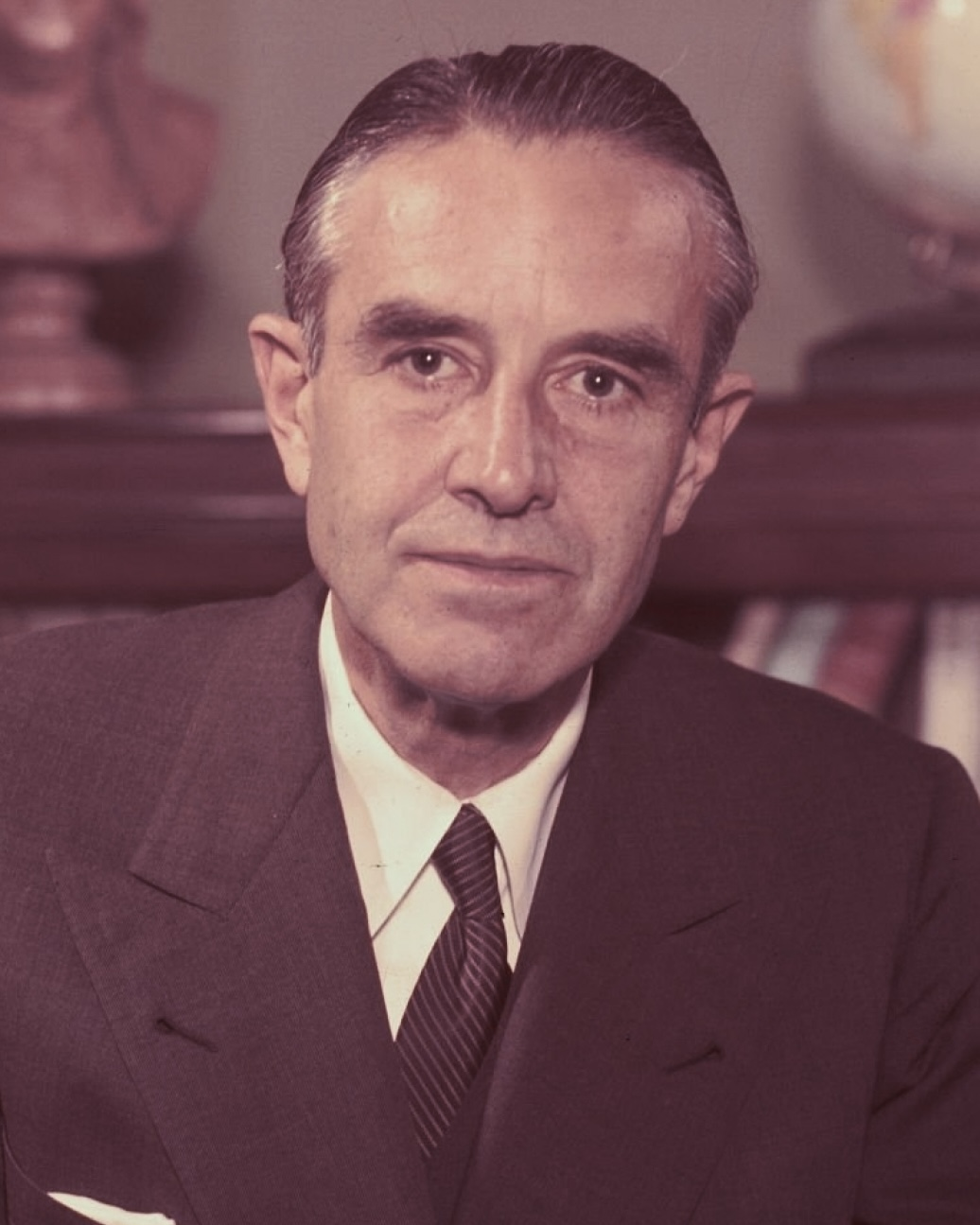

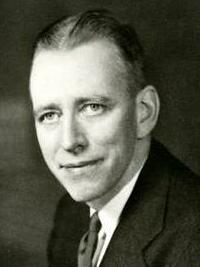
Nominee	W. Averell Harriman	Irving Ives
Party	Democratic	Republican
Alliance	Liberal
Running mate	George DeLuca	J. Raymond McGovern
Popular vote	2,560,738	2,549,613
Percentage	49.61%	49.40%
- County results Harriman: 50–60% 60–70% 70–80% Ives: 50–60% 60–70% 70–80%
Governor before election
Thomas Dewey
Republican
Elected Governor
W. Averell Harriman
Democratic

The 1954 New York gubernatorial election was held on November 2, 1954, to elect the Governor and Lieutenant Governor of New York. Incumbent Republican governor Thomas E. Dewey did not run for re-election to a fourth term in office. In the race to succeed Dewey, W. Averell Harriman defeated U.S. Senator Irving Ives by 11,125 votes, the closest margin in a New York gubernatorial election since 1850.

Harriman won the Democratic nomination on September 21 over U.S. Representative Franklin D. Roosevelt Jr., son of the former president, in one of the bitterest nomination contests in the history of New York. The key support of party bosses in New York City ultimately provoked the reform crusade by Eleanor Roosevelt which brought about the downfall of Tammany Hall.

== Background ==
This was the first election in which the voters were required to cast a single joint vote for governor and lieutenant governor, following a 1953 amendment to the New York Constitution.

== Republican nomination ==
=== Candidates ===
- Irving Ives, United States Senator since 1947

==== Declined ====
- Thomas E. Dewey, incumbent Governor since 1943

=== Campaign ===
Irving Ives announced on September 9 that he would accept the Republican nomination if offered and wage a forceful general election campaign. Ives's announcement came only after a protracted effort to convince Governor Dewey to run for a fourth term and came with the endorsement of the Republican state committee.

== Democratic nomination ==
=== Candidates ===
- W. Averell Harriman, former United States Secretary of Commerce, director of the Mutual Security Agency, United States Ambassador to the United Kingdom and United States Ambassador to the Soviet Union
- Franklin D. Roosevelt Jr., U.S. Representative from the Upper West Side of Manhattan and son of President Franklin D. Roosevelt

==== Declined ====
- Robert F. Wagner Jr., mayor of New York City

=== Campaign ===
Franklin Delano Roosevelt Jr., who had been elected to three terms in the United States House of Representatives, announced his campaign on June 11. Although he represented the Upper West Side of Manhattan, he launched his campaign without seeking the support of powerful New York City political bosses Carmine DeSapio of Tammany Hall, which still dominated Manhattan Democratic politics, or Charles A. Buckley of the Bronx. His support came instead from Western New York, where William B. Mahoney of Erie County led an eight-county coalition of 104 delegates for Roosevelt. Another seven counties in the Capital District also pledged their 66 delegates, along with his native Dutchess County, totaling 178 delegates in all. Roosevelt announced that he expected to gain the support of over three hundred delegates by August 1, and his campaign expected to carry all but four or five counties outside of New York City.

On August 26, the Roosevelt and Harriman campaigns met in a display of unity at Saratoga Springs, as guests of Thomas J. Shanahan, president of Federation Bank and Trust Company. The meeting put the strong contrast between the two campaigns on display. Roosevelt's support came from younger Democrats, amateurs in politics and crusaders for social reform, such as Americans for Democratic Action. Harriman had support from most seasoned political operatives and supporters of the New Deal platform of Roosevelt's father, including former Roosevelt speechwriter Samuel Rosenman. However, veteran politicians in the upstate region, who were dissatisfied with state party leadership, were far more likely to support Roosevelt than those in New York City. Notable Roosevelt staffers included former White House Press Secretary Roger Tubby and future U.S. Representative Jonathan B. Bingham.

In September, Democratic leaders intensified their efforts to force Roosevelt out of the race and clear the field for Harriman. On September 8, Mayor of New York City Robert F. Wagner Jr., state party chair Richard H. Balch, Tammany Hall boss Carmine DeSapio, and U.S. Representative and Bronx party boss Charles A. Buckley met with Roosevelt, urging him not to "split the party" and arguing that Harriman would be the stronger candidate in the general election. After that effort failed, Balch and DeSapio endorsed Harriman with support from Senator Herbert H. Lehman and Mayor Wagner, as well as the party bosses in the Bronx, Brooklyn, and Staten Island, giving Harriman a clean sweep of New York City outside of Queens and at least 419 of the necessary 510 needed for the nomination. Outside of New York City, however, Roosevelt had firm support in Albany and Buffalo.

On September 10, Roosevelt received the overwhelming endorsement of the state Congress of Industrial Organizations. Of the 1,121 delegates to the CIO State Council convention, only nine dissented from the endorsement. CIO leaders cited Roosevelt's record and their opposition to the "hand-picking" of Harriman by party leadership.

=== Results ===
The Democratic state convention was held on September 21. Enmities between the two campaigns ran high, and Carmine DeSapio was booed during the opening sessions.

During the afternoon, Roosevelt's campaign suffered a major blow when Queens elected to cast its 94 votes unanimously for Harriman as a unit; Roosevelt had hoped to win 20–25 votes there. Then, a poll of the Westchester County delegation revealed Harriman led 33 to 5, with only two votes undecided. With nearly unanimous support in New York City, Harriman was thus the favorite for the nomination.

The nomination contest was opened by James J. McGuinness of Albany, who placed Roosevelt's name into nomination. The crowds, which were composed mostly of Roosevelt supporters, booed mention of DeSapio, whom they believed controlled the convention in favor of Harriman. McGuinness's speech lasted over an hour, and was followed by John J. Young of Syracuse, who nominated Harriman. Young stressed Harriman's executive experience in the Roosevelt and Truman administrations.

At 1:10 a.m., Onondaga County gave Harriman a total of eighteen votes, bringing his total to 541. Roosevelt, who had been following the proceedings from the 165th Infantry Armory via radio, arrived onstage to concede the nomination and call for it to be made unanimous. He asked his supporters to "let bygones be bygones", and the motion for a unanimous nomination carried.

=== Aftermath ===
Though Roosevelt made a show of unity and Harriman eventually carried the general election, the 1954 campaign was the beginning of the end of Tammany Hall. At least partially in response to DeSapio's maneuvers against her son, Eleanor Roosevelt joined with Herbert H. Lehman and Thomas K. Finletter to establish the New York Committee for Democratic Voters, a reform organization dedicated to opposing Tammany. Their efforts eventually resulted in DeSapio's resignation in 1961.

== General election ==
=== Candidates ===
- W. Averell Harriman, former United States Secretary of Commerce, director of the Mutual Security Agency, United States Ambassador to the United Kingdom and United States Ambassador to the Soviet Union (Democratic and Liberal)
  - Running mate: George B. DeLuca, Bronx County District Attorney
- Irving Ives, United States Senator since 1947 (Republican)
  - Running mate: J. Raymond McGovern, New York State Comptroller and former State Senator from New Rochelle
- Nathan Karp, Queens textile laborer and perennial candidate (Industrial Government)
  - Running mate: Stephen Emery, subway dispatcher and candidate for U.S. Senate in 1950
- John T. McManus, journalist (American Labor)
  - Running mate: Karen Morley, former film actress
- David L. Weiss (Socialist Workers)
  - Running mate: Dorothy Haines

=== Results ===
1954 New York gubernatorial election
Party	Candidate	Votes	%	±%
Democratic	W. Averell Harriman	2,296,645	44.50%	▲7.18
Liberal	W. Averell Harriman	264,093	5.11%	▲0.11
Total	W. Averell Harriman	2,560,738	49.61%	▲7.29
Republican	Irving Ives	2,549,613	49.40%	▼3.71
American Labor	John T. McManus	46,886	0.91%	▼3.27
Socialist Workers	David L. Weiss	2,617	0.05%	▼0.20
Industrial Government	Nathan Karp	1,720	0.03%	▼0.10
Total votes		5,161,574	100.00%	
