= The Hidden Curriculum =

1970 book by Benson R. Snyder

- 1973 edition cover
- Author: Benson R. Snyder
- Language: English
- Publication date: 1970
- Publication place: United States

The Hidden Curriculum (1970) is a book by the psychiatrist Benson R. Snyder (March 29, 1923, in Glen Ridge, N.J. – September 4, 2012, in Cambridge, Mass.), the then-Dean of Institute Relations at the Massachusetts Institute of Technology. Snyder advances a thesis that much of campus conflict and students' personal anxiety is caused by unstated academic and social norms. These hidden norms affect the ability to develop independently or think creatively, and form what Snyder calls the hidden curriculum. He illustrates his thesis with psychological studies and other research conducted at MIT and Wellesley College.

== Summary ==
The phrase "hidden curriculum" was coined by Philip W. Jackson in his 1968 book entitled Life in Classrooms, in a section about the need for students to master the institutional expectations of school. Snyder develops this with observations of particular institutions. Snyder then addresses the question of why students — even or especially the most gifted — turn away from education. Even honest efforts to enrich curricula frequently fail, says Snyder, thanks to the importance of the tacit and unwritten understanding. He says that while some students do not realize there is a disjunction between the two curricula, in a demanding environment, students develop strategies to cope with the requirements they face.

Many students find they can not possibly complete all the work assigned them; they learn to neglect some of it. Some student groups maintain files of past examinations, which only worsen this situation.

The difference between the formal and real requirements produced considerable dissonance among the students and resulted in cynicism, scorn, and hypocrisy among students, and particular difficulty for minority students. No part of the university community, writes Snyder, neither the professors, the administration nor the students, desires the end result created by this process.

The Saturday Review said the book "will gain recognition as one of the more cogent 'college unrest' books" and that it presents a "most provocative thesis."

The book has been cited many times in studies.

== See also ==
- Activity theory
- Distributed cognition
- Situated cognition
