= Frank Hogan =

American politician and lawyer

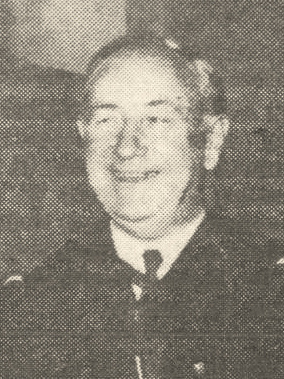
- Hogan in 1960

34th District Attorney of New York County
- In office January 1, 1942 – February 6, 1974
- Preceded by: Thomas E. Dewey
- Succeeded by: Richard H. Kuh

Personal details
- Born: Frank Smithwick Hogan; January 17, 1902 Waterbury, Connecticut, U.S.
- Died: April 2, 1974 (aged 72) New York City, New York, U.S.
- Party: Democratic
- Education: Columbia University; Columbia Law School

Frank Smithwick Hogan (January 17, 1902 – April 2, 1974) was an American lawyer and politician from New York. He served as New York County District Attorney for more than 30 years, during which he achieved a reputation for professionalism and integrity.

== Early life and education ==
Hogan was born in Waterbury, New Haven County, Connecticut. He received his undergraduate degree from Columbia University in 1924. At first, Hogan planned on becoming a reporter and studied journalism. He decided to switch his focus to the law and received his LL.B. from Columbia Law School in 1928. Hogan was a member of the Beta Theta Pi fraternity at Columbia and continued to reside in the Morningside Heights section of Manhattan (primarily at 404 Riverside Drive) for the remainder of his life.

== Career ==
After law school, he entered into private practice for several years. In 1935, he began in the New York County District Attorney's office as an Administrative Assistant District Attorney under Thomas E. Dewey. In 1941, Dewey announced that he would not seek re-election. He suggested four prosecutors who he believed should succeed him. Although Dewey's list included Hogan's name, his selection surprised Dewey. First Hogan, unlike Dewey, was a registered Democrat and his list was meant for the Republicans. In addition, Dewey did not expect the support of Tammany Hall for his preferred candidate, after he prosecuted some of their leaders. Not only did Tammany offer its support, but the Republicans and the American Labor Party endorsed Hogan, which guaranteed his election. Thus, he became the new District Attorney on January 1, 1942.

During his time in the New York County District Attorney's Office, Hogan conducted many widely publicized investigations. Corruption and racketeering were high on his list, with one of the earliest cases involving the 1946 NFL Championship Game between the Chicago Bears and New York Giants. He prosecuted high-profile crime figures Joseph Lanza, Joe Adonis and Frank Erickson, as well as corrupt politicians such as Manhattan borough president Hulan Jack and former deputy city controller Eugene Sugarman.

In the 1950s and early 1960s, his office investigated the rigging of television quiz programs, as well as 'fixed' college basketball games, most notably with the 1951 college basketball point-shaving scandal and the subsequent 1961 NCAA University Division men's basketball gambling scandal. He prosecuted the well-known Lenny Bruce obscenity case. Another high-profile case involved the exoneration of George Whitmore, Jr. in 1963, after his confession regarding the murder of two women in their upper east side Manhattan apartment was found to be false.

In 1965 Consolidated Edison purchased a plot of land near Columbia University with the intention of building a small electrical substation there, but was unready to start work. With Hogan's help, this land was donated to Columbia, giving Con Ed a tax deduction and taking it off their real estate taxes. Eighteen months later Con Ed was ready to start construction, and bought the land back from Columbia for one dollar.

In 1949, he considered a run for Mayor of New York when William O'Dwyer announced that he would not seek re-election. Hogan ended the campaign after O'Dwyer changed his mind to run again. He decided to run for the United States Senate in 1958 for the seat that Irving Ives was vacating. While Democratic leaders Averell Harriman and mayor Robert Wagner Jr. preferred a candidate with a larger statewide profile, Carmine DeSapio, the head of Tammany Hall pushed Hogan's candidacy. The move backfired on DeSapio with Kenneth B. Keating defeating Hogan and Nelson Rockefeller becoming Governor of New York.

In later years, some of assistants criticized his style as being too rigid and old-fashioned and that he may have been in office too long. They cited his prosecution of comedian Lenny Bruce in 1964 and anti-war protestors at Columbia University in 1968. In 1971, Governor Nelson Rockefeller appointed Maurice Nadjari over Hogan and the other New York City district attorneys to lead investigations under the Knapp Commission, which mayor John Lindsay established to investigate police corruption. Chairman Whitman Knapp said that Hogan did not properly investigate corruption in the New York City Police Department leading to Nadjari's appointment. The move left Hogan feeling humiliated and damaged his friendship with Knapp, one of his former assistants.

The Knapp fallout and a primary challenge from William vanden Heuvel led to speculation that Hogan would not seek a ninth term in office. However, he surprised observers by running in the 1973 election. Vanden Heuvel's campaign message was that the city needed someone new in the district attorney's office. Several days before the election, the New York City Bar Association gave vanden Heuvel an "unqualified" rating, which may have affected his support. In the end, Hogan won with a two-to-one edge in votes.

== Personal life ==
Hogan served on the Board of Trustees of Columbia University from 1959 until his death in 1974.

He was married to the former Mary Egan.

He had surgery for a lung tumor in 1973 and later suffered a stroke on August 10, 1973. Citing ill health, he resigned on December 26 and entered the hospital the following day. Governor Malcolm Wilson appointed Richard Kuh to replace him; Kuh would be sworn in on February 13. Hogan died of cancer at St. Luke's Hospital in Manhattan on April 2, 1974.

== Legacy ==
The street address of the main office of the New York County District Attorney is One Hogan Place in his honor. Hogan Hall, a dormitory at Columbia University, is also named for him.

Legal offices
Preceded by Thomas E. Dewey	New York County District Attorney; 1942–1973	Succeeded by Richard Kuh
Party political offices
Preceded by John Cashmore	Democratic Nominee for the U.S. Senate from New York (Class 1); 1958	Succeeded by Robert F. Kennedy
Preceded by George Counts	Liberal nominee for U.S. senator from New York (Class 1); 1958	Succeeded by Robert F. Kennedy
