= 1958 United States Senate election in New York =

- November 4, 1958
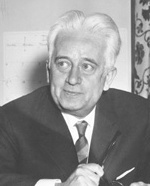

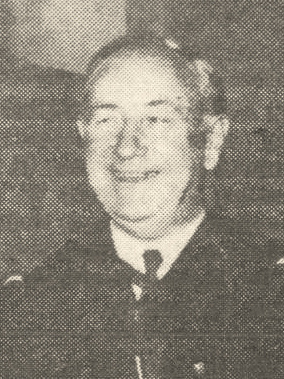
Nominee	Kenneth Keating	Frank Hogan
Party	Republican	Democratic
Alliance		Liberal
Popular vote	2,842,942	2,709,950
Percentage	50.75%	48.38%
- County results Keating: 50–60% 60–70% 70–80% Hogan: 50–60% 60–70%
Senator before election
Irving Ives
Republican
Elected Senator
Kenneth Keating
Republican

The 1958 United States Senate election in New York was held on November 4, 1958. Incumbent Republican Senator Irving Ives retired. Republican Representative Kenneth Keating defeated Democrat Frank Hogan to succeed Ives. As of 2024, this is the last time the Republicans won the Class 1 Senate seat in New York.

== Republican convention ==
At the Republican convention, held on August 26 in Rochester, U.S. Representative Kenneth Keating was nominated by acclamation.

== Democratic convention ==
=== Candidates ===
==== Declared ====
- Thomas K. Finletter, former Secretary of the Air Force
- Frank Hogan, District Attorney of New York County
- Thomas E. Murray Sr., former Atomic Energy Commissioner

=== Results ===
The Democratic convention was held on August 26.

1958 Democratic Convention
Party	Candidate	Votes	%
Democratic	Frank Hogan	772	67.60%
Democratic	Thomas E. Murray Sr.	304	26.62%
Democratic	Thomas K. Finletter	66	5.78%
Total votes		1,317	100.00%

== General election ==
=== Candidates ===
- Frank Hogan, District Attorney of New York County (Democratic and Liberal)
- Kenneth Keating, U.S. Representative from Rochester (Republican)
- Corliss Lamont, Chairman of National Council of American-Soviet Friendship (Independent Socialist)

The Liberal Party initially chose Thomas K. Finletter as its nominee for Senate, but after Finletter lost the Democratic nomination to Frank Hogan, Finletter withdrew and the party endorsed Hogan instead.

=== Results ===
1958 United States Senate election in New York
Party	Candidate	Votes	%
Republican	Kenneth Keating	2,842,942	50.75%
Democratic	Frank Hogan	2,434,899	43.46%
Liberal	Frank Hogan	275,051	4.91%
'Total'	Frank Hogan	2,709,950	48.38%
Independent Socialist	Corliss Lamont	49,087	0.88%
Total votes		5,601,979	100.00%
