= Senator Keating =

Senator Keating may refer to:

- Bill Keating (politician) (born 1952), Massachusetts State Senate
- Frank Keating (born 1944), Oklahoma State Senate
- Kenneth Keating (1900–1975), U.S. Senator from New York
