= Nancy Cole (psychologist) =

American psychologist

Nancy Cole is an educational psychologist and expert on educational assessment. Cole is past president of the American Educational Research Association and the Educational Testing Service (ETS), and former Dean of Education at the University of Illinois at Urbana-Champaign. She earned her Ph.D. in psychology from the University of North Carolina. Her undergraduate education in psychology was at Rice University (B.A., 1964).

Cole co-authored Gender and Fair Assessment (Willingham & Cole, 1997), which is regarded as the most extensive study ever completed on gender and educational assessment. The study analyzed data from more than 400 assessments of over 15 million students.

== Criticism ==
In his book, "Uneducated Guesses", Howard Wainer refers to Cole's presidency of the ETS as "disastrous." FairTest, the National Center for Fair and Open Testing reports that during this period, ETS " ignored internal warnings about security problems in its computer adaptive Graduate Record Exam (GRE), according to documents recently made public in a U.S. district court...To protect its image and profits in the rush to introduce the new type of test into the marketplace, ETS also misled the New York State legislature about how the system actually worked...In fact, in her deposition, ETS President Nancy Cole admits it is now clear, in retrospect, that back in November of 1994, one or two good memorizers could have given a substantial advantage to a subsequent test-taker."

Cultural offices
Preceded by Richard Shavelson	President of the American Educational Research Association; 1988–1989	Succeeded by Philip W. Jackson
