= Carmine DeSapio =

American politician (1908–2004)

- DeSapio on Firing Line, May 1, 1967

Secretary of State of New York
- In office January 1, 1955 – January 1, 1959
- Governor: W. Averell Harriman
- Preceded by: Thomas J. Curran
- Succeeded by: Caroline Simon

Grand Sachem of Tammany Hall
- In office 1949–1962
- Succeeded by: Edward N. Costikyan

Personal details
- Born: December 10, 1908 New York, New York, U.S.
- Died: July 27, 2004 (aged 95) New York, New York, U.S.
- Party: Democratic
- Spouse: Theresa Natale (m. 1937; died 1998)
- Children: 1
- Education: Fordham University

Carmine Gerard DeSapio (December 10, 1908 – July 27, 2004) was an American politician from New York City. He was the last head of the Tammany Hall political machine to dominate municipal politics.

== Early life and career ==
DeSapio was born and raised in Greenwich Village, Manhattan. His father was an Italian immigrant from Monteforte Irpino, Campania, while his mother was a second generation Italian American. DeSapio's father operated a trucking business. DeSapio graduated from Fordham University in 1931.

He started his career in the Tammany Hall organization as an errand boy and messenger for precinct captains. DeSapio earned a reputation during his deliveries of coal and turkey on behalf of the local Tammany club by thanking recipients for their acceptance of Tammany handouts. Tammany Hall had dominated New York City politics from the mayoral victory of Fernando Wood in 1854 until the election of Fiorello H. La Guardia in 1933. DeSapio was first elected a district captain in 1939, but was rejected by the leadership in the struggle between Irish and Italian interests for control of the organization. In 1943 he was accepted as district leader for lower Greenwich Village.

== Tammany Hall boss ==
In 1949, DeSapio became the youngest "boss" in the history of Tammany Hall, succeeding Hugo Rogers.

DeSapio's Italian heritage signaled the end of Tammany's longtime dominance by Irish-American politicians, and he became the first nationally prominent Italian-American political leader.

Unlike many previous Tammany Hall bosses, DeSapio always made his decisions known to the public and promoted himself as a reformer. As boss of Tammany, he demonstrated liberal credentials when he diversified Tammany's leadership by naming the first Puerto Rican Manhattan district leader, Anthony Mandez, and backed Hulan Jack as Manhattan's first African-American Borough President. His ties with Frank Costello also failed to halt his rise to power in the local political scene. DeSapio reformed Tammany Hall's traditional sale of judgeships early in his role as Boss, reducing the cost of a position of a judge from $75,000 to $25,000. This money was used to offset the cost of campaign expenses.

=== Public image ===
DeSapio always seemed a personally modest man. Even though he operated out of four lavish offices, he lived for fifty years in a middle-class apartment on Washington Square with his wife Theresa Natale ("Natalie") and daughter Geraldine. As leader of Tammany Hall, DeSapio reveled in the limelight, attending charitable fund-raising events, making himself available to the press, and delivering speeches in highbrow venues that were thought off-limits to political bosses. In wielding his enormous political clout, he usually preferred extensive consultations and consensus-building to unilateral decision-making. His 16- to-18-hour workday began with pre-breakfast phone calls at home where, still dressed in pajamas and bathrobe, he received a stream of political associates. DeSapio would then visit his various offices for further meetings, and cram in a half-dozen public functions, including radio and television appearances and a late-night political dinner.

DeSapio succeeded in shucking Tammany's notoriety and fashioning himself as a sophisticated, enlightened and modern political boss. He favored well-tailored dark suits and striped ties and always looked as if he had just stepped out of a barber's chair. The only incongruity was the dark glasses he was forced to always wear because of chronic iritis.

=== Involvement with organized crime ===
Throughout his political life, DeSapio was noted for alleged involvement with organized crime, even though he fought to distance the organization from the unsavory days of Boss Tweed, and allegations of corruption. In 1951, Senator Estes Kefauver of Tennessee concluded that DeSapio was assisting the activities of New York's most powerful mobster Frank Costello, and that Costello had become influential in decisions made by the Tammany Hall council. DeSapio admitted to having met Costello several times, but insisted that "politics was never discussed". These connections were examined by the Kefauver Commission.

However, it later became apparent that he was also selling out to benefit local mobsters such as Costello. DeSapio was accused of staffing New York City's government with clubhouse hacks. He steered valuable city contracts for streetlights and parking meters to the Broadway Maintenance Corporation, a company that, according to the State Investigation Commission, cheated taxpayers out of millions of dollars.

=== 1953 mayoral election ===
In 1953, DeSapio turned against the other Democratic leaders in New York City and used the power of Tammany Hall to ensure the defeat of Vincent R. Impellitteri in the Democratic Party primary to Robert F. Wagner Jr., a pro-reform Democrat, helping Wagner win the general election. Following Wagner's success, DeSapio became a powerful kingmaker in the New York political scene.

=== 1958 U.S. Senate race ===
In 1958, DeSapio's image was severely damaged after he successfully manoeuvred to have his own candidate for Senate, Manhattan District Attorney Frank Hogan, placed on the Democratic and Liberal ticket. New Yorkers now saw DeSapio as an old-time Tammany Hall boss and Hogan lost the Senate election to Republican Kenneth Keating. Republican Nelson Rockefeller was elected Governor the same year as well. Democrats who had once praised DeSapio now found it expedient to excoriate him. In 1961, Wagner won re-election by running a reformist campaign that denounced his former patron, DeSapio, as an undemocratic practitioner of Tammany machine politics. The same year, DeSapio lost the district leadership of his native Greenwich Village, a post he had held for two decades, to an upstart reform Democrat, James Lanigan, who was backed by nationally known liberal Democrats such as Wagner, Eleanor Roosevelt and former Senator Herbert H. Lehman.

=== Ouster ===
His leadership ended in 1961, and with it the dynasty that was Tammany Hall. It took several years of work by Eleanor Roosevelt to bring this about. She told local journalist Murray Kempton, who published her remarks many years later in 1991 when he was a columnist for Newsday, "I told Carmine I would get him for what he did to Franklin, and get him I did." She had vowed revenge because she felt DeSapio had derailed her son's (Franklin D. Roosevelt, Jr.) political ambitions by persuading him to abandon his run for Governor of New York in 1954 and instead run for New York Attorney General. After Roosevelt dropped out, DeSapio then got the local Democratic Party officials to accept former banker and diplomat W. Averell Harriman as the Democratic Party's nominee for governor in the New York state election. Harriman barely managed to secure victory as Governor of New York and Roosevelt lost his bid to become the New York Attorney General. Following Harriman's victory, DeSapio served in Harriman's cabinet as Secretary of State of New York.

== Later career ==
In 1963 and 1965, after Lanigan stepped down, DeSapio tried to retake his position as Greenwich Village district leader, but was twice defeated by another reform candidate, Edward I. Koch, who was elected mayor in 1977. DeSapio reached a low point in 1969 when he was convicted in a federal court of conspiracy and bribery after it was acknowledged that he conspired to bribe the New York City water commissioner, James L. Marcus, and extort contracts from Consolidated Edison that would result in kickbacks. He served two years in federal prison (1971–1973). After his release, he never re-entered politics, although he supported many community, charitable, and civic causes. He regained some of his former popularity through his skill as a speaker. In 1992, former Mayor Ed Koch, his opponent in 1963 and 1965, whom DeSapio had later befriended and met with on occasions, said of him, "He is a crook, but I like him ... Most politicians still like DeSapio. He always gets the most applause when he is introduced at Democratic dinners".

Among DeSapio's accomplishments were support of the Fair Employment Practices Law, the New York City rent control laws, and the lowering of the voting age to 18.

== Death ==
DeSapio died at age 95 on July 27, 2004, at St. Vincent's Hospital in Manhattan. He was interred in a private mausoleum at Calvary Cemetery in Woodside, Queens. He was survived by his daughter Geraldine A. DeSapio.

Political offices
| Preceded by Thomas J. Curran | Secretary of State of New York; 1955–1959 | Succeeded by Caroline Simon |
