= Caroline Simon =

American politician (1900–1993)

Caroline Klein Simon (November 12, 1900, New York City – July 29, 1993, Manhattan, New York City) was an American lawyer and politician.

== Life ==
She graduated from New York University Law School in 1925.

District Attorney Thomas E. Dewey of Manhattan named her to a panel on revising the Domestic Relations Court Act. During World War II she served as the Office of Civilian Defense's director of group activities in New York, New Jersey and Delaware.

Dewey, now Governor, appointed her to the New York State Workers' Compensation Board in 1944, and the temporary State War Council's Committee on Discrimination in Employment in 1943, serving in both posts until 1945. After the war, she helped draft the nation's first state law on job bias based on race, religion or nationality and became a founding member of the resulting New York State Commission Against Discrimination.

In 1956, Governor W. Averell Harriman, a Democrat, appointed her to the new New York State Youth Commission. The next year she ran for New York City Council President as a Republican, but she lost to Abe Stark. In 1958, she served as the legal advisor to the American delegation to the United Nations Human Rights Commission.

In 1959 Governor Nelson A. Rockefeller appointed her Secretary of State of New York, the second woman to hold that post after Florence E. S. Knapp. During her tenure she issued the nation's first regulations against "block busting", in which brokers manipulated property owners' fears about racial or ethnic changes in the neighborhood to provoke sales.

In 1963 she was appointed a judge of the New York Court of Claims.

== Family ==
She married Leopold K. Simon, a lawyer. Their children were Lee K. Simon and Cathy Simon Prince. They divorced in the early 1950s. She then married Irving W. Halpern (d. 1966), who was chief probation officer of the New York City Court of General Sessions.

== Sources ==
- Lambert, Bruce (July 30, 1993). "Caroline K. Simon Is Dead at 92; Led Fight Against Discrimination". The New York Times.
- Short bio at Jewish Women's Archive
- Political Graveyard

Political offices
Preceded by Carmine DeSapio	Secretary of State of New York; 1959–1963	Succeeded by John P. Lomenzo
