= 1952 United States Senate election in New York =

- November 4, 1952
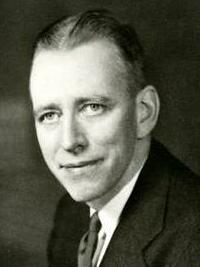

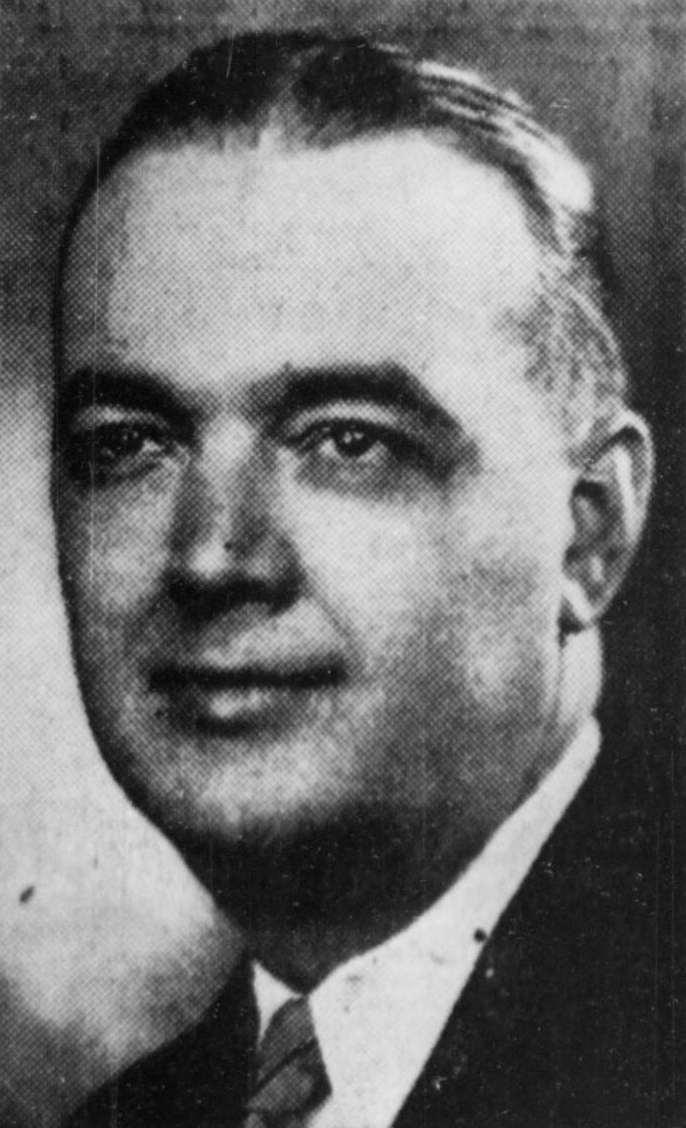

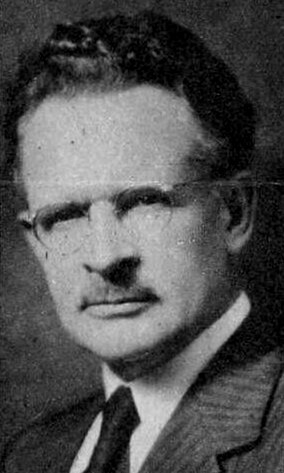
Nominee	Irving Ives	John Cashmore	George S. Counts
Party	Republican	Democratic	Liberal
Popular vote	3,853,934	2,521,736	489,775
Percentage	55.21%	36.13%	7.02%
- County results Ives: 40–50% 50–60% 60–70% 70–80% 80–90% Cashmore: 40–50%
U.S. senator before election
Irving M. Ives
Republican
Elected U.S. Senator
Irving M. Ives
Republican

The 1952 United States Senate election in New York was held on November 4. Incumbent Republican Senator Irving M. Ives was re-elected to a second term in office over Democrat John Cashmore with a then-record margin of victory.

== Democratic nomination ==
=== Candidates ===
- John Cashmore, Brooklyn Borough President
- Stanley W. Church, Mayor of New Rochelle
- Peter J. Crotty, former President of the Buffalo City Council
- Edward H. Foley Jr., Undersecretary of the Treasury
- W. Averell Harriman, Director of the Mutual Security Agency and former U.S. Secretary of Commerce (1946–48)
- Donald W. Kramer, Mayor of Binghamton
- Robert F. Wagner Jr., Manhattan Borough President

=== Convention ===
The Democratic State Convention was held at the Commodore Hotel in Manhattan on August 28. A welcoming speech was delivered by Mayor Vincent Impellitteri. Before the candidates were announced, presidential candidate Adlai Stevenson II addressed the delegates. John Cashmore was nominated on the first ballot. He overcame five avowed candidates, including Manhattan Borough President Robert F. Wagner Jr., who had been the favorite for the seat only weeks before.

Cashmore also rejected a last-minute proposal by party chairman Paul E. Fitzpatrick that he and the other leading candidates would withdraw in an effort to draft W. Averell Harriman into the race. Harriman had recently been an unsuccessful candidate for the Democratic nomination for president and had publicly stated he would not run for Senator. However, Fitzpatrick believed that the Liberal Party, which openly preferred Harriman or Wagner, would refuse to support Cashmore. Cashmore, certain of his chances even without Liberal support, declined.

After it became clear that Cashmore had a majority on the first ballot, Wagner moved to make his nomination unanimous, and county delegations began to switch to him en masse. Before switches, the first ballot stood as follows:

1952 New York Democratic Convention
Party	Candidate	Votes	%
Democratic	John Cashmore	582	57.00%
Democratic	Robert F. Wagner Jr.	278	27.23%
Democratic	Peter Crotty	104	10.19%
Democratic	Donald W. Kramer	33	3.23%
Democratic	Edward H. Foley Jr.	23	2.25%
Democratic	Stanley W. Church	1	0.10%
Total votes		1,021	100.00%

Cashmore had solid support from his native Brooklyn, Queens, the Bronx and the Capital District. Wagner's support came from Manhattan, Long Island, and Buffalo. Cashmore also took twelve crucial votes in Wagner's native Manhattan, delivered to him by renegade West Side leader Robert B. Blaikie. Westchester, which was expected to be solidly for its native son Stanley Church, had not yet voted before it became clear Cashmore would win; the county voted for Cashmore instead, beginning the stampede.

Cashmore made an acceptance speech in which he assailed Senator Ives for playing to the reactionary base of the Republican Party despite his publicly avowed progressivism.

== Liberal nomination ==
The Liberals met on August 28 and formally nominated Dr. George S. Counts, Professor of Education at Teachers College, Columbia University. Counts's nomination was intended to be temporary, as the Liberal Party usually cross-endorsed the Democratic nominee. However, the nomination of John Cashmore proved untenable for the Liberals, and in early September they chose to stick by Counts as their candidate. The party considered endorsing Senator Ives but decided against such an endorsement due to Ives's vote for the Taft-Hartley Act in 1947. Counts himself chose not to withdraw from the race before the deadline of September 5, after Cashmore rejected a proposal that they both drop out in favor of Averell Harriman.

== General election ==
=== Results ===
The Republican incumbent Ives was re-elected with the then-largest margin in state history.

1952 U.S. Senate election in New York (Note: In 1946, Herbert Lehman was the Democratic, American Labor, and Liberal nominee. All changes are for each respective ticket; thus, Cashmore outperformed Lehman's Democratic total while performing about 11 pp worse than him overall, because he lacked those cross-endorsements.)
Party	Candidate	Votes	%	±%
Republican	Irving M. Ives (incumbent)	3,853,934	55.21%	▲2.63
Democratic	John Cashmore	2,521,736	36.13%	▲1.43
Liberal	George S. Counts	489,775	7.02%	▲3.25
American Labor	Corliss Lamont	104,702	1.50%	▼7.45
Socialist Workers	Michael Bartell	4,263	0.06%	N/A
Socialist	Joseph G. Glass	3,382	0.05%	N/A
Socialist Labor	Nathan Karp	2,451	0.04%	N/A
Total votes		6,980,243	100.00%	

== Endorsements ==
Counts endorsements

Local officials

- Rudolph Halley, president of the New York City Council

Organizations

- Americans for Democratic Action

Notable individuals

- W. H. Auden, poet
- Elliot E. Cohen, editor of Commentary
- Donald S. Harrington, reverend
- Sidney Hook, philosopher
- Horace Kallen, philosopher
- Max Lerner, journalist
- Dorothy Schiff, owner and publisher of the New York Post

== Sources ==
- Official result: FINAL STATE COUNT GIVES RECORD VOTE; Eisenhower Carried New York by 848,214 Margin as Total of 7,216,054 Cast Ballots in NYT on December 9, 1952 (subscription required)

== Works cited ==
- Soyer, Daniel (2021). Left in the Center: The Liberal Party of New York and the Rise and Fall of American Social Democracy. Cornell University Press. ISBN 9781501759888. JSTOR 10.7591/j.ctv1hw3x50.2.

== See also ==
- 1952 United States Senate elections
- New York state elections
- 1952 United States presidential election
