= John F. Hayes (Borough President of Brooklyn) =

American politician (1915–2001)

Borough President of Brooklyn
- In office May 7, 1961 – December 31, 1961
- Preceded by: John Cashmore
- Succeeded by: Abe Stark

Personal details
- Born: 1915 Brooklyn, New York, U.S.
- Died: January 3, 2001 (aged 85) New York, New York, U.S.
- Party: Democratic
- Spouse: Margaret Sullivan (m. 1948)
- Education: Fordham University (AB, LLB)

John Francis Hayes (1915 – January 3, 2001) was an American politician who served as the Borough President of Brooklyn in 1961. Hayes served a 35-year career as assistant and deputy to a number of Brooklyn borough presidents before he was elected to the New York State Supreme Court in 1977. He retired in 1984. In 1957, during his tenure as executive assistant to John Cashmore, Hayes took a phone call from Walter O'Malley, who announced he was taking the Brooklyn Dodgers to the West Coast. Prominent figures of the time stated, "the reality was John Hayes was the borough president in all but the title. He was the guy who would take those calls."

Political offices
Preceded by John Cashmore	Borough President of Brooklyn; 1961	Succeeded by Abe Stark
