= 1946 United States Senate election in New York =

- November 5, 1946
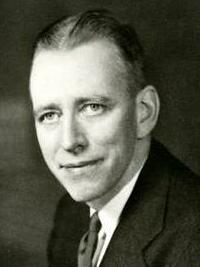

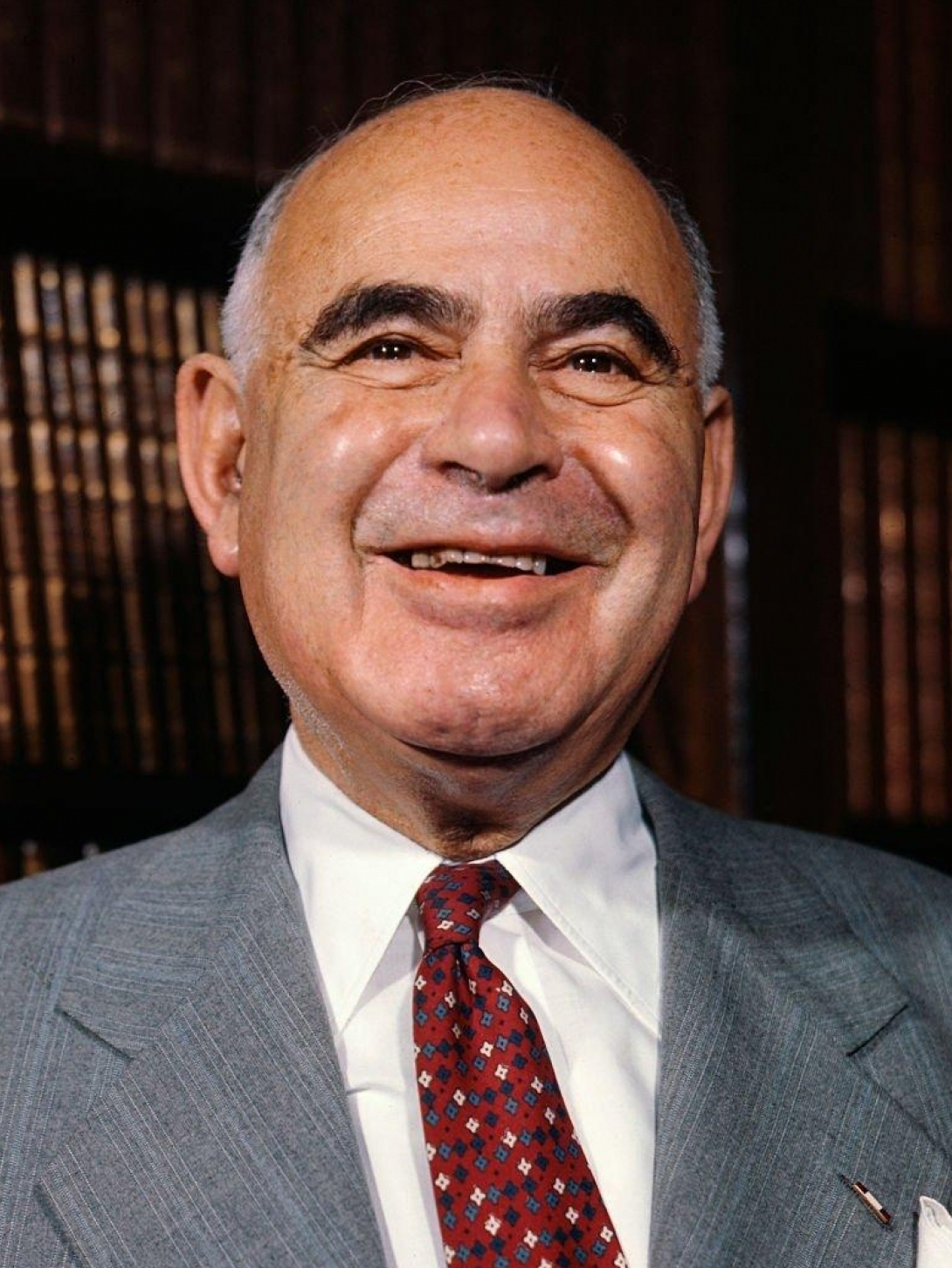
Nominee	Irving Ives	Herbert Lehman
Party	Republican	Democratic
Alliance		Liberal; American Labor
Popular vote	2,559,365	2,308,112
Percentage	52.58%	47.42%
- County results Ives: 50–60% 60–70% 70–80% 80–90% Lehman: 50–60% 60–70%
U.S. senator before election
James M. Mead
Democratic
Elected U.S. Senator
Irving M. Ives
Republican

The 1946 United States Senate election in New York was held on November 5, 1946.

== Democratic nomination ==
=== Candidates ===
- Herbert H. Lehman, former governor of New York

==== Declined ====
- James M. Mead, incumbent senator (running for governor)

=== Convention ===
The Democratic state convention met on September 4 at Albany. Former Governor Herbert H. Lehman was the only candidate nominated. His name was placed into nomination by Jeremiah T. Mahoney and seconded by former First Lady Eleanor Roosevelt.

== Republican nomination ==
=== Candidates ===
- William J. Donovan, retired U.S. Army Major General, former Director of the Office of Strategic Services (1942–45) and nominee for Governor in 1932
- Irving M. Ives, Majority Leader of the New York State Assembly

=== Convention ===
The Republican state convention met on September 4 at Saratoga Springs, New York. Assembly Majority Leader Irving M. Ives was nominated unanimously after General Donovan, facing overwhelming defeat, withdrew that morning and pledged his support to the Republican ticket.

== General election ==
=== Candidates ===
- Irving M. Ives, Assemblyman from Chenango County and Assembly Majority Leader (Republican)
- Herbert H. Lehman, former Governor of New York (Democratic, American Labor, and Liberal)

The Liberal Party of New York nominated Lehmann by gathering 51,015 signatures and filed a petition to nominate candidates with the Secretary of State on September 2. The American Labor state convention met on September 3 and endorsed Lehman.

==== Disqualified ====
- Eric Hass (Industrial Government)

The Socialist Labor state convention met on April 7 and nominated Eric Hass for the U.S. Senate. The party filed a petition to nominate its candidates under the name "Industrial Government Party." The Industrial Government, Socialist and Socialist Workers tickets were not allowed on the ballot because of "defective nominating petitions." The Court of Appeals upheld the decisions of the lower courts.

=== Results ===
The whole Republican ticket was elected in a landslide.

General election results
Party	Candidate	Votes	%	±%
Republican	Irving M. Ives	2,559,365	52.58%	▲5.92
Total	Herbert Lehman	2,308,112	47.42%	
Democratic	Herbert Lehman	1,688,887	34.70%	
American Labor	Herbert Lehman	435,846	8.95%	
Liberal	Herbert Lehman	183,379	3.77%	
Total votes		4,867,477	100.00%	
Republican gain from Democratic				

Obs.:

- "Blank, void and scattering" votes: 178,694
