= Hogan Hall =

Coordinates: 40°48′23.17″N 73°57′52.47″W

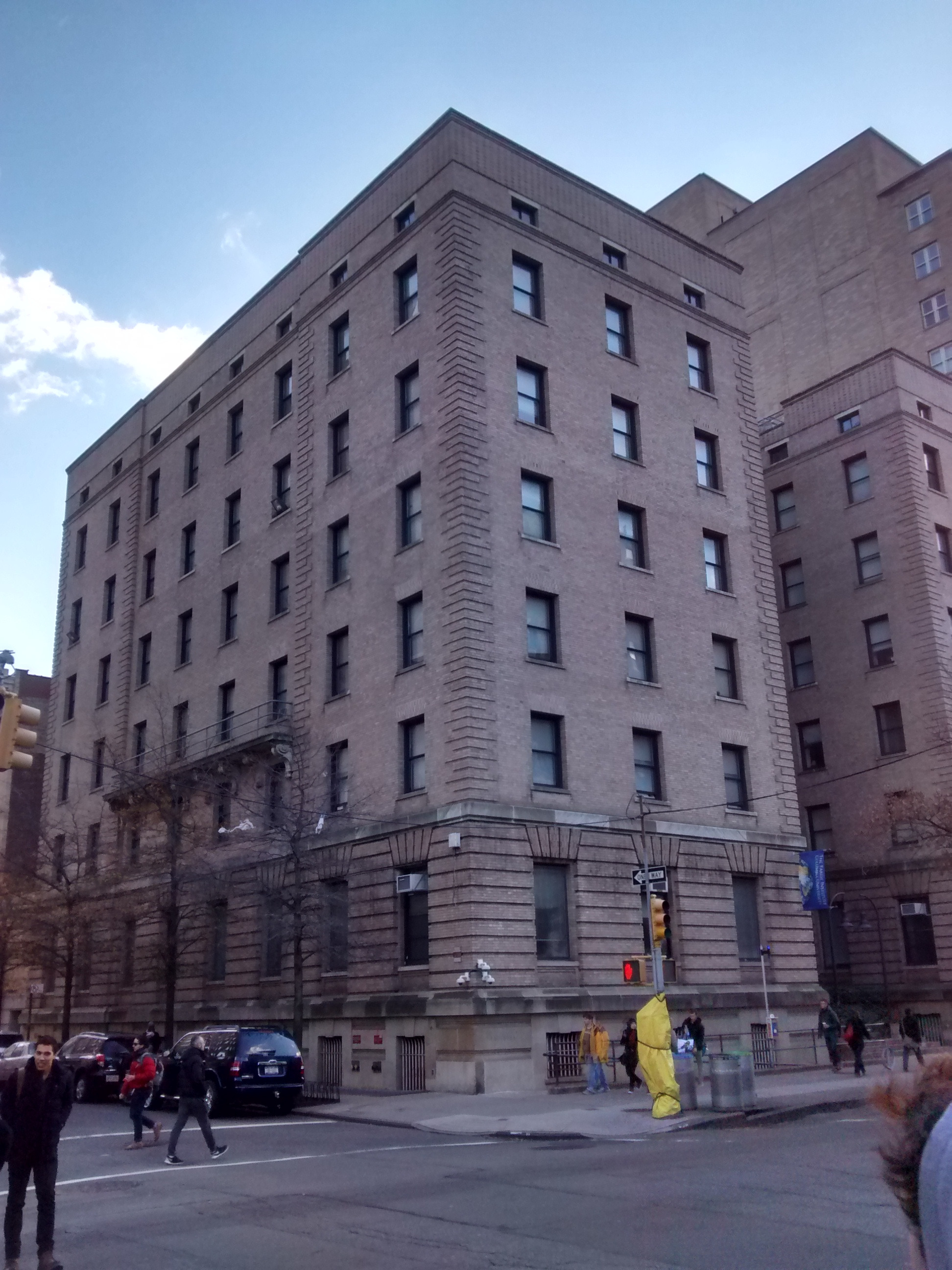
- Hogan Hall in 2015

General information
- Address: 556 W. 114th Street, New York City, New York
- Named for: Frank Hogan
- Opened: 1898
- Owner: Columbia University

Technical details
- Floor count: 7

Hogan Hall is a dormitory of Columbia University primarily reserved for fourth-year undergraduate students. The dorm is popular for its suite configurations as well as its central location. Built in 1898 as a nursing home, the building was converted to graduate student housing in 1977. It was named after Frank S. Hogan. It was converted into an undergraduate residence in 1994, then renovated in 2000 with the completion of a new entrance connecting it to Broadway Hall, designed by Robert A.M. Stern Architects. Located at the corner of 114th Street and Broadway in the Manhattan neighborhood of Morningside Heights, the building is named for former New York District Attorney Frank Hogan.

The building was home to a four-seat, eight-course dining club Pith that had a waitlist of over 1,000 reservations. It was shut down in 2016 amid Health Department complaints.

== Notable residents ==
- Cristina Teuscher, Olympic swimmer and gold medalist
- Jonah Reider, known for opening the four-seat supper club Pith in his dorm room
