= George A. Arkwright =

New York Supreme Court judge

George Alfred Arkwright (September 19, 1888 – August 25, 1972) was an American attorney and justice on the New York Supreme Court.

== Biography ==
Arkwright was born in Brooklyn in 1888, the son of George Alfred Arkwright and Mary Anna McKeever. He attended the University of Pennsylvania, graduating in 1911, and received a law degree from Fordham University in 1917. He served in the American Expeditionary Forces in France during the First World War. He fought at the Battle of San Mihiel and in the Meuse–Argonne offensive. Following his military service, he returned to New York where he worked as an attorney for the next 25 years. He was elected as the president of the Brooklyn Bar Association three times. In 1943 Arkwright was appointed to the New York Public Service Commission by Thomas Dewey. He was the first member from Brooklyn to serve on the Commission in 13 years. In 1945 Arkwright was the Republican‐Liberal party candidate for Borough President of Brooklyn but lost the election to the Democratic candidate John Cashmore.

He was elected as a justice of the New York Supreme Court in 1950, a position he held until 1958. In 1956-58, Arkwright conducted an investigation into unethical legal actions by Brooklyn attorneys. He was also the leader of the Arkwright Investigation, a probe into collaboration between doctors and lawyers to defraud insurance companies. He was replaced on the New York Supreme Court by George Eilperin.

== Personal life ==
Arkwright married Loretta Cleary and was the father of five children.
