= SS Raymond V. Ingersoll =

World War II Liberty ship of the United States

History

United States
- Name: Raymond V. Ingersoll
- Namesake: Raymond V. Ingersoll
- Owner: War Shipping Administration (WSA)
- Operator: Agwilines Inc
- Ordered: as type (EC2-S-C1) hull, MC hull 2317
- Builder: J.A. Jones Construction, Panama City, Florida
- Cost: $945,999
- Yard number: 58
- Way number: 5
- Laid down: 27 July 1944
- Launched: 31 August 1944
- Completed: 18 September 1944
- Identification: Call sign: KSSK
- Fate: Sold for commercial use, 6 February 1947

Norway
- Name: Sneland I
- Owner: Rich. Amlie & Co.
- Fate: Sold, 1959

Poland
- Name: Kopalnia Zabrze; MP-ZP-GDY-8
- Operator: Polish Steamship Co.
- Refit: Converted to floating warehouse and renamed, 1975
- Fate: Scrapped, 1982

General characteristics
- Class & type: Liberty ship; type EC2-S-C1, standard
- Tonnage: 10,865 LT DWT; 7,176 GRT
- Displacement: 3,380 long tons (3,434 t) (light); 14,245 long tons (14,474 t) (max)
- Length: 441 feet 6 inches (135 m) oa; 416 feet (127 m) pp; 427 feet (130 m) lwl
- Beam: 57 feet (17 m)
- Draft: 27 ft 9.25 in (8.4646 m)
- Installed power: 2 × Oil fired 450 °F (232 °C) boilers, operating at 220 psi (1,500 kPa); 2,500 hp (1,900 kW)
- Propulsion: 1 × triple-expansion steam engine, (manufactured by General Machinery Corp., Hamilton, Ohio); 1 × screw propeller
- Speed: 11.5 knots (21.3 km/h; 13.2 mph)
- Capacity: 562,608 cubic feet (15,931 m^{3}) (grain); 499,573 cubic feet (14,146 m^{3}) (bale)
- Complement: 38–62 USMM; 21–40 USNAG
- Armament: Varied by ship; Bow-mounted 3-inch (76 mm)/50-caliber gun; Stern-mounted 4-inch (102 mm)/50-caliber gun; 2–8 × single 20-millimeter (0.79 in) Oerlikon anti-aircraft (AA) cannons and/or, 2–8 × 37-millimeter (1.46 in) M1 AA guns

SS Raymond V. Ingersoll was a Liberty ship built in the United States during World War II. She was named after Raymond V. Ingersoll, borough president of Brooklyn from 1934 to 1940.

== Construction ==
Raymond V. Ingersoll was laid down on 27 July 1944, under a Maritime Commission (MARCOM) contract, MC hull 2317, by J.A. Jones Construction, Panama City, Florida; and launched on 31 August 1944.

== History ==
She was allocated to Polarus Steamship Company, 18 September 1944. On 3 June 1946, she was laid up in the National Defense Reserve Fleet, Hudson River Reserve Fleet, Jones Point, New York.

Reallocated to Polarus Steamship Company, 12 July 1946. Placed in National Defense Reserve Fleet, Mobile, Alabama, 17 October 1946.

She was sold, on 6 February 1947, to Rich. Amlie & Co., for $599,309.36 and commercial use. She was flagged in Norway and renamed Sneland I. In 1959, she was sold to the Polish Government, allocated to the Polish Steamship Co., and renamed Kopalnia Zabrze. She was converted to a floating warehouse in 1975, and renamed MP-ZP-GDY-8, until being scrapped in 1982.

== Bibliography ==
- "Jones Construction, Panama City FL". www.ShipbuildingHistory.com. 13 October 2010.
- Maritime Administration. "Raymond V. Ingersoll". Ship History Database Vessel Status Card. U.S. Department of Transportation, Maritime Administration. This article incorporates text from this source, which is in the public domain.
- Davies, James (May 2004). "Specifications (As-Built)" (PDF). p. 23.
- "SS Raymond V. Ingersoll".
