= George Eilperin =

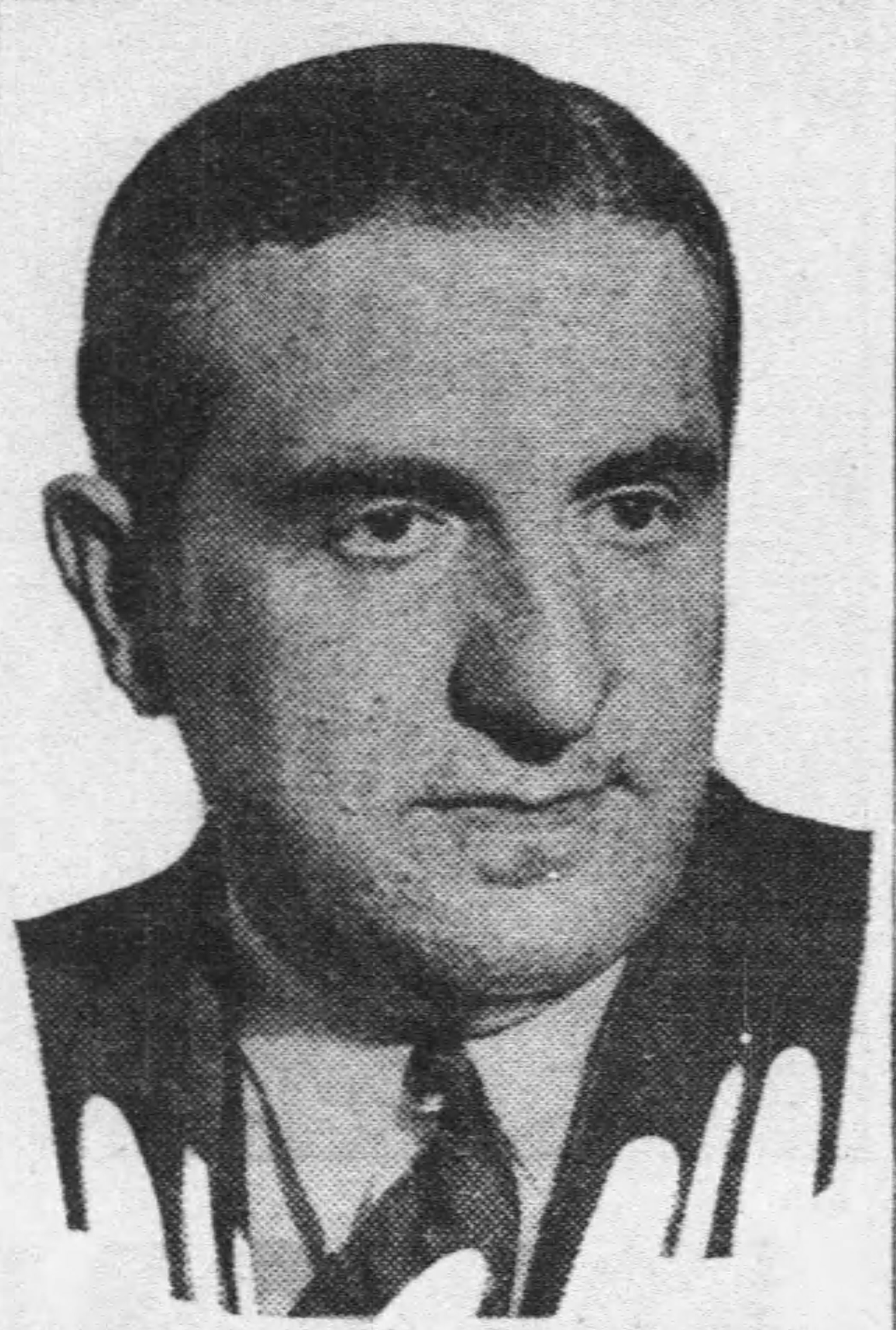
Eilperin in 1933

George Eilperin (December 27, 1895 – November 3, 1963) was a Republican politician and judge on the New York Supreme Court.

== Biography ==
Born in Brooklyn, Eilperin was the son of Samuel and Bella Eilperin, who were supporters of the Republican Party. Eilperin attended Manual Training High School. He graduated from Columbia University and Brooklyn Law School, graduating in 1917. Eilperin began his career in the Internal Revenue Service, working as Chief Field Deputy of the Brooklyn office. He was the youngest deputy in the Service. In this position he investigated the income taxes of Representative John A. Quayle and Democratic politician Edward J. Riegelmann. He also collected $161,000 in unreported profits from boxing promoter J. Humbert Fugazy. In 1926, Eilperin resigned from the job to practice law in partnership with Harold L. Turk. Their law firm, Turk & Eilperin, represented Eva Kotchever at her 1927 deportation hearing.

The following year he was elected Republican leader of the 14th Assembly District, in a contested election against Benjamin Moskowitz. His victory was later unsuccessfully challenged by Moskowitz, on the grounds that Eilperin was not a resident of the 14th A.D. In 1929, Eilperin was involved in a Brooklyn Supreme Court case brought by a coal company against his brother Jacob Eilperin, a city magistrate. It was alleged that Jacob had been involved in George Eilperin's attempt to purchase a coal company, despite Jacob's role as a public official. George Eilperin testified in defense of his brother. Jacob Eilperin lost the case and was fined $6570 for his failure to follow the contract he had signed with Meyer Coal Company. John P. O'Brien appointed Eilperin Commissioner of Taxes and Assessments in 1933. In 1946 he was named chairman of the Law Committee of the Kings County Republican Committee.

Eilperin received a bipartisan nomination to the position of City Court judge in 1948, succeeding George J. Joyce. In 1958, he was made a Justice of the New York Supreme Court, replacing George Arkwright. He presided over a notable case in 1962, brought by students who was suspended from St. John's University for their civil marriage ceremony. Eilperin ruled that the University's power to enforce Christianity was "too vague...to authorize dismissal" and the students were allowed to graduate. He died at his house, 57 Montague Street, Brooklyn, following gall bladder surgery.
