= Richard Kuh =

American lawyer (1921–2001)

District Attorney of New York County
- In office February 5, 1974 – December 31, 1974
- Preceded by: Frank Hogan
- Succeeded by: Robert Morgenthau

Personal details
- Born: Richard Henry Kuh; April 27, 1921 New York City, U.S.
- Died: November 17, 2011 (aged 90) New York City, U.S.
- Education: Columbia University; Harvard Law School

Richard Henry Kuh (April 27, 1921 – November 17, 2011) was a partner at the law firm of Warshaw Burstein Cohen Schlesinger & Kuh, LLP. He served as New York County District Attorney from February to December, 1974.

== Education ==
Kuh received a Bachelor of Arts, Phi Beta Kappa from Columbia University in 1941, and his Juris Doctor degree from Harvard Law School with magna cum laude distinction in 1948. At Harvard, Kuh was also on the Board of Editors for the Harvard Law Review.

== New York County District Attorney's Office ==
As a New York County Assistant D.A., Kuh served as Administrative Assistant to District Attorney Frank Hogan and Chief of the Criminal Courts Bureau. Kuh was the prosecutor who won the controversial conviction of Lenny Bruce on obscenity charges. Kuh had no regrets in the case.

In 1974, Kuh succeeded Hogan as District Attorney of New York County after Hogan suffered a stroke and resigned. In September 1974, Kuh was defeated by Robert Morgenthau in the Democratic primary for the special election to fill the vacancy. Kuh was DA when Philippe Petit made his famous tightrope walk between the Twin Towers of the World Trade Center in New York City and famously agreed that his punishment should be a free show for children in Central Park.

Legal offices
Preceded by Frank Hogan	New York County District Attorney; 1974	Succeeded by Robert M. Morgenthau
