= John Cashmore =

American politician

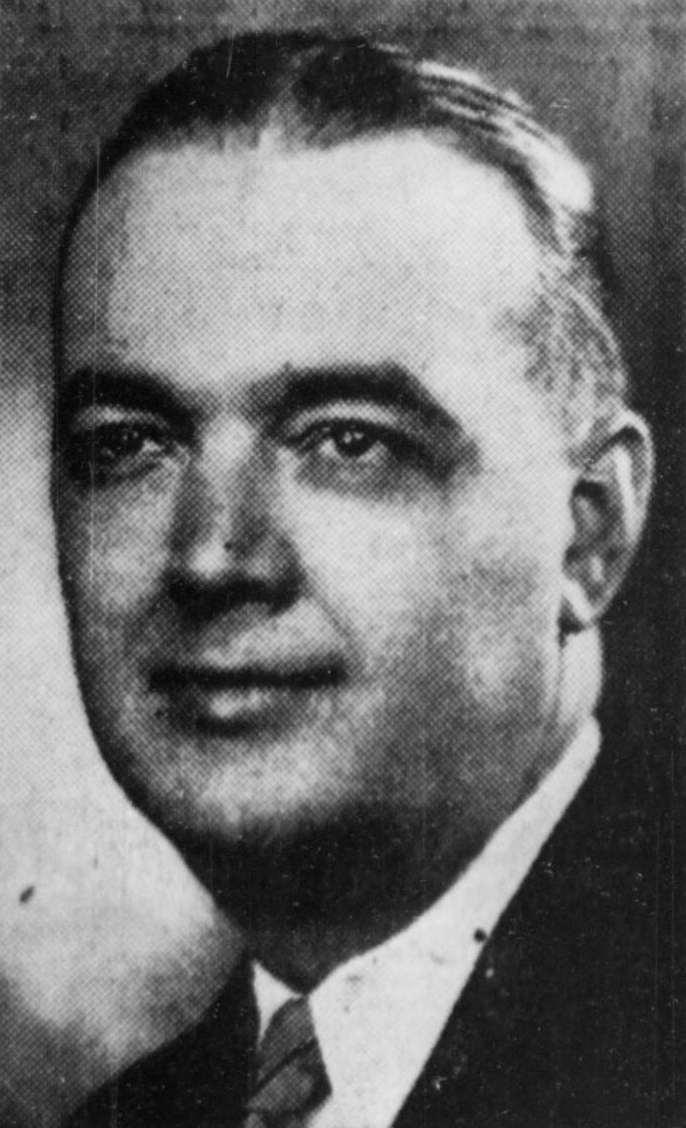
- Portrait by The New York Times, 1941

13th Borough President of Brooklyn
- In office March 4, 1940 – May 7, 1961
- Preceded by: Arthur R. Ebel
- Succeeded by: John F. Hayes

Majority Leader of the New York City Council
- In office September 23, 1938 – March 4, 1940
- President: Newbold Morris
- Preceded by: Baruch Charney Vladeck
- Succeeded by: Joseph T. Sharkey

Minority Leader of the New York City Council
- In office January 11, 1938 – September 23, 1938
- President: Newbold Morris
- Preceded by: Thomas J. Curran (Note: as Minority Leader of the New York City Board of Aldermen)
- Succeeded by: Baruch Charney Vladeck

Member of the New York City Council from Brooklyn At-Large
- In office January 1, 1938 – March 4, 1940
- Preceded by: Constituency established
- Succeeded by: Multi-member district

Member of the New York State Democratic Committee
- In office 1938–1944

Member of the New York State Assembly from the 5th Kings district
- In office January 1, 1923 – December 31, 1923
- Preceded by: James H. Caulfield Jr.
- Succeeded by: Joseph C. H. Flynn

Personal details
- Born: June 7, 1895 New York City, U.S.
- Died: May 7, 1961 (aged 65) New York City, U.S.
- Party: Democratic
- Spouse: Edythe Tenney (m. 1926)
- Children: James John Cashmore
- Known for: Inspiration for Cat's in the Cradle

John Cashmore (June 7, 1895 – May 7, 1961) was an American politician from New York City who served as Borough President of Brooklyn from 1940 until his death in 1961.

== Early life ==
Cashmore was born in Brooklyn, New York on June 7, 1895.

== Career ==
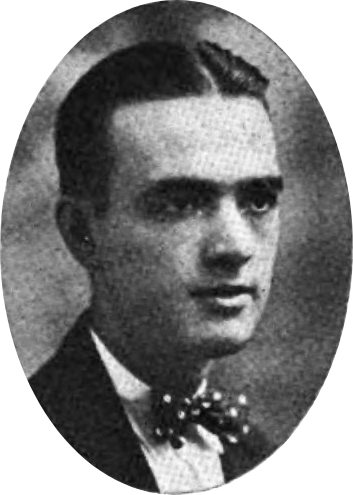
Cashmore's official State Assembly portrait, 1923

=== Business ===
Cashmore was an aide to the general manager of the New York Edison Company and a furniture manufacturer.

=== Politics ===
Cashmore entered politics as a member of the New York State Assembly (Kings Co., 5th D.) in 1923. He was later elected to the newly-formed New York City Council, serving as its majority leader from 1938 to 1940. He was also a member of the New York State Democratic Committee from 1938 to 1944.

Cashmore was elected Brooklyn Borough president in 1940, succeeding Raymond V. Ingersoll. He held this position until 1961, though he was unsuccessfully challenged in the 1945 election by George A. Arkwright. He was the Democratic candidate for U.S. Senator from New York in 1952, but was defeated by the incumbent Republican Irving M. Ives. He was a delegate to the 1948, 1952, 1956 and 1960 Democratic National Conventions.

== Death ==
Cashmore died in New York City on May 7, 1961. He had been sick for several months.

== Personal life ==
Cashmore married Edythe Tenney (1898–1972) in 1926. They had one son, James John Cashmore (1931–1977).

== In popular culture ==
The 1974 Harry Chapin song "Cat's in the Cradle" was based in part on John Cashmore's relationship with his son James, written by Chapin's wife (Sandra Campbell Gaston Cashmore Chapin) who was previously married to James John Cashmore 1931–1977

== Sources ==
- Political Graveyard
- Behind The Song: Cat's In The Cradle

Party political offices
Preceded by Herbert H. Lehman	Democratic Nominee for the U.S. Senate from New York (Class 1); 1952	Succeeded by Frank Hogan
New York State Assembly
Preceded by James H. Caulfield, Jr.	New York State Assembly; Kings County, 5th District; 1923	Succeeded by Joseph C. H. Flynn
Political offices
Preceded by Raymond V. Ingersoll	Borough President of Brooklyn; 1940 – 1961	Succeeded by John F. Hayes
