= 1965 New York state election =

- November 2, 1965

The 1965 New York state election was held on November 2, 1965, to elect a judge of the New York Court of Appeals, as well as all members of the New York State Assembly and the New York State Senate.

== Background ==
Judge Marvin R. Dye would reach the constitutional age limit of 70 years at the end of the year.

In December 1964, the assembly and senate districts were re-apportioned. This time, the legislators were elected for an exceptional one-year term (the session of 1966). From this election on, the assembly districts are all numbered statewide (from 1 to 165, in 1966; from 1 to 150 thereafter) instead of apportioned by county and numbered inside the county (previously 150 districts). This was the only general election of state legislators in an odd-numbered year after 1937.

== Result ==
Former Senator Kenneth Keating was elected.

1965 state election result
Office	Republican		Democratic		Liberal		Conservative	
Judge of the Court of Appeals	Kenneth B. Keating	3,105,864	Owen McGivern	1,824,064	Owen McGivern	207,942	Henry S. Middendorf Jr.	207,387

== See also ==
- New York state elections
- 1965 New York City mayoral election

== Sources ==
- KEATING IS VICTOR IN COURT CONTEST; Ex-Senator Tops McGivern for Appeals Bench in Sole Statewide Election in NYT on November 3, 1965 (subscription required)

Vote totals from New York Red Book 1966
