= 1964 United States Senate election in New York =

- November 3, 1964
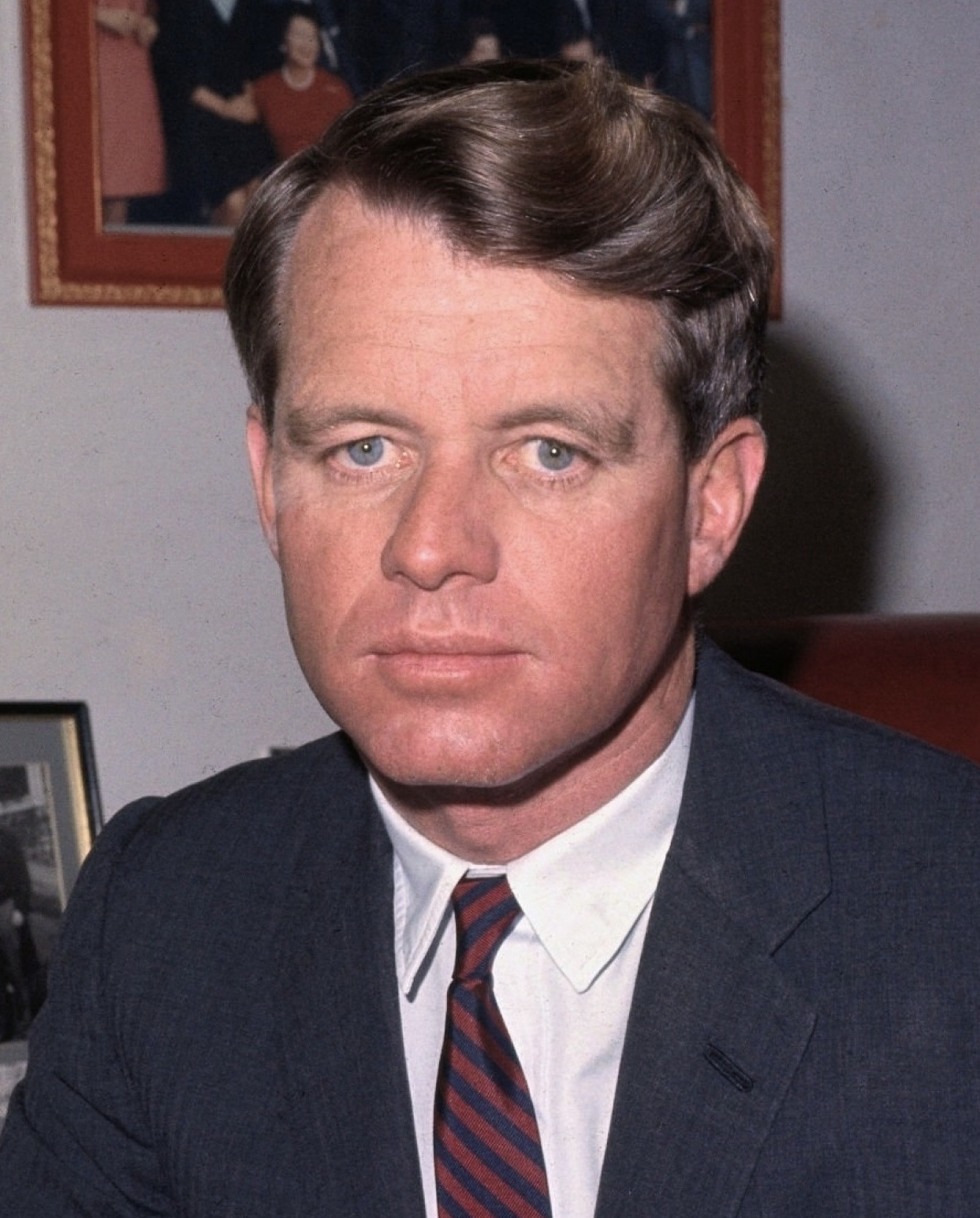

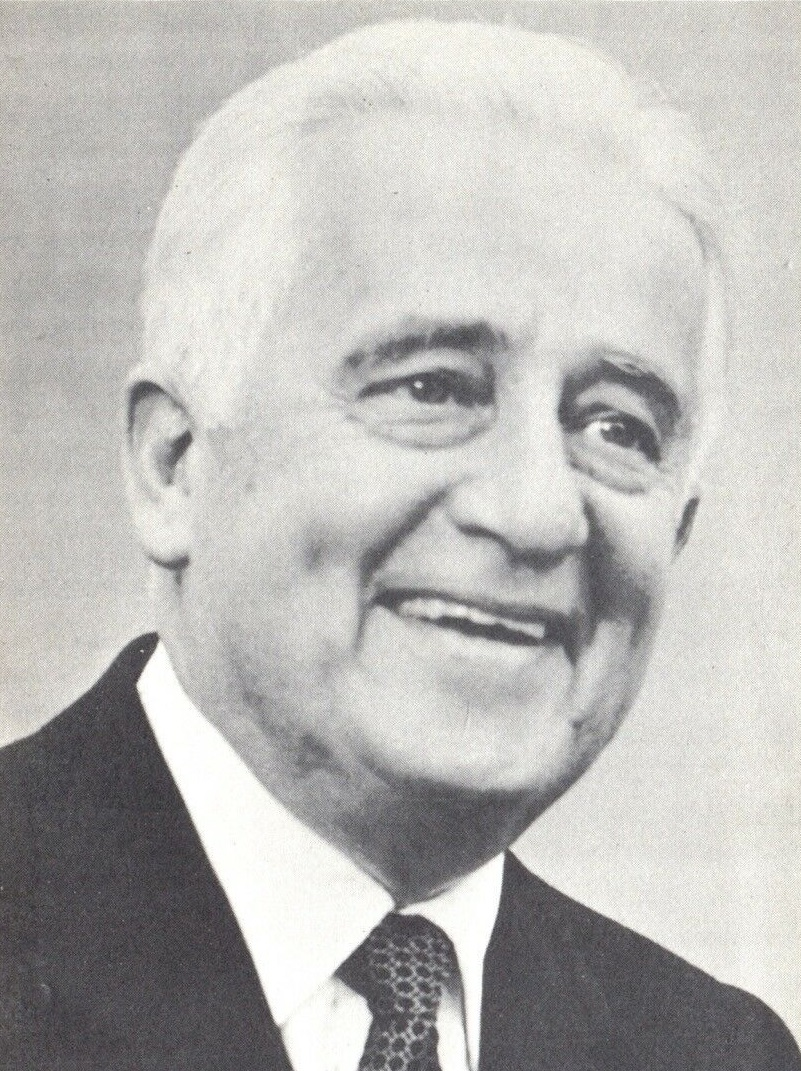
Nominee	Robert F. Kennedy	Kenneth Keating
Party	Democratic	Republican
Alliance	Liberal
Popular vote	3,823,749	3,104,056
Percentage	53.47%	43.40%
- County results Kennedy: 40–50% 50–60% 60–70% Keating: 40–50% 50–60% 60–70%
U.S. senator before election
Kenneth Keating
Republican
Elected U.S. Senator
Robert F. Kennedy
Democratic

The 1964 United States Senate election in New York was held on November 3, 1964. Republican incumbent Kenneth Keating ran for re-election to a second term but was defeated by Robert F. Kennedy.

== Democratic nomination ==
=== Candidates ===
- Robert F. Kennedy, U.S. attorney general and brother of John F. Kennedy
- Samuel S. Stratton, U.S. representative from Schenectady

John English, a Nassau County leader who helped John F. Kennedy during the 1960 presidential election, encouraged Robert Kennedy to oppose Keating. At the time, Samuel S. Stratton, a member of the United States House of Representatives from New York's 35th congressional district, was considered the most likely Democratic candidate. At first, Kennedy resisted. After President Kennedy's assassination, Robert Kennedy remained as attorney general under President Lyndon B. Johnson. However, Johnson and Kennedy feuded. Kennedy decided to run for the Senate in New York in August, and resigned from the cabinet on September 3, 1964. While many reform Democrats resisted Kennedy, New York City mayor Robert F. Wagner Jr. and party bosses like Charles A. Buckley and Peter J. Crotty backed Kennedy.

=== Convention results ===
The Democratic Party state convention met on September 1 and nominated Kennedy on the only ballot with 968 votes against 153 for Stratton.

== Other nominations ==
The Socialist Labor state convention met on March 29, and nominated John Emanuel. The Republican state convention met on August 31, and re-nominated the incumbent U.S. Senator Kenneth B. Keating. The Conservative state convention met on August 31 at Saratoga Springs, New York, and nominated Henry Paolucci. The Liberal Party met on September 1, the same day as the Democratic convention, and endorsed Kennedy.

The Socialist Workers Party filed a petition to nominate candidates on September 7. Richard Garza was nominated.

== General election ==
=== Candidates ===
- John Emanuel (Socialist Labor)
- Richard Garza (Socialist Workers)
- Kenneth Keating, incumbent U.S. senator since 1959 and associate judge of the New York Court of Appeals since 1959 (Republican)
- Robert F. Kennedy, U.S. attorney general and brother of John F. Kennedy (Democratic and Liberal)
- Henry Paolucci (Conservative)

=== Campaign ===
During the campaign, Kennedy was frequently met by large crowds. Keating accused Kennedy of being an arrogant "carpetbagger" from Massachusetts. Kennedy responded to these charges in a televised town meeting by saying, "If the senator of the state of New York is going be selected on who's lived here the longest, then I think people are going to vote for my opponent. If it's going be selected on who's got the best New York accent, then I think I'm probably out too. But I think if it's going be selected on the basis of who can make the best United States senator, I think I'm still in the contest."

=== Results ===
Campaign help from President Lyndon B. Johnson, as well as the Democratic landslide after the assassination of John F. Kennedy, helped carry Kennedy into office, though Kennedy polled about 1.1 million votes fewer than Johnson did in New York.

1964 New York United States Senate election
Party	Candidate	Votes	%	±%
Democratic	Robert F. Kennedy	3,539,103	49.49%	+6.03%
Liberal	Robert F. Kennedy	284,646	4.00%	−0.91%
Total	Robert F. Kennedy	3,823,749	53.47%	+5.09%
Republican	Kenneth Keating (incumbent)	3,104,056	43.40%	−7.35%
Conservative	Henry Paolucci	212,216	2.97%	+2.97%
Socialist Labor	John Emanuel	7,358	0.1%	+0.1%
Socialist Workers	Richard Garza	4,202	0.06%	+0.06%
Total votes		7,151,581	100.00%	
Spoilt vote	Blank, void, and scattering	152,909		

== Aftermath ==
Kennedy had served fewer than four years in office when he announced that he would challenge Johnson for the 1968 Democratic nomination for president. After Johnson withdrew, Kennedy faced Hubert Humphrey and Eugene McCarthy for the nomination. However, he was assassinated in June 1968. Charles Goodell was appointed to complete the remainder of this term.

== See also ==
- 1964 New York state election
- 1964 United States Senate elections
