= Raymond Ingersoll =

American politician (1875–1940)

Raymond Vail Ingersoll
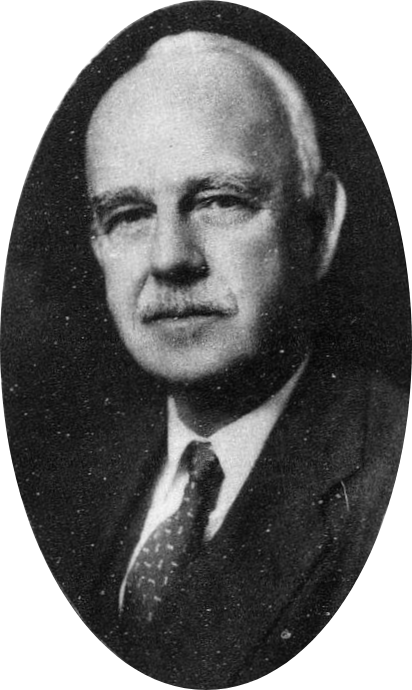
- Ingersoll c. 1937

Borough President of Brooklyn
- In office January 1, 1934 – February 24, 1940

Personal details
- Born: 1875 Corning, New York
- Died: February 24, 1940 (aged 64) Brooklyn, New York

Raymond V. Ingersoll (1875–1940) was borough president of Brooklyn from 1934 to 1940, and Brooklyn Parks Commissioner from 1914 to 1917.

He died at Long Island College Hospital on February 24, 1940 at the age of 64.

Ingersoll is buried in the Friends Quaker Cemetery, which is located in Prospect Park in Brooklyn.

== Legacy ==
The following are named after Ingersoll:

- Ingersoll Hall, one of the first buildings on the Brooklyn College campus
- Ingersoll Houses, a public housing complex in Fort Greene, Brooklyn
- SS Raymond V. Ingersoll, a Liberty Ship built during World War II

Political offices
Preceded by Henry Hesterburg	Borough President of Brooklyn; 1934 – 1940	Succeeded by John Cashmore
