= Ingersoll Houses =

Public housing development in Brooklyn, New York

- NYCHA Property
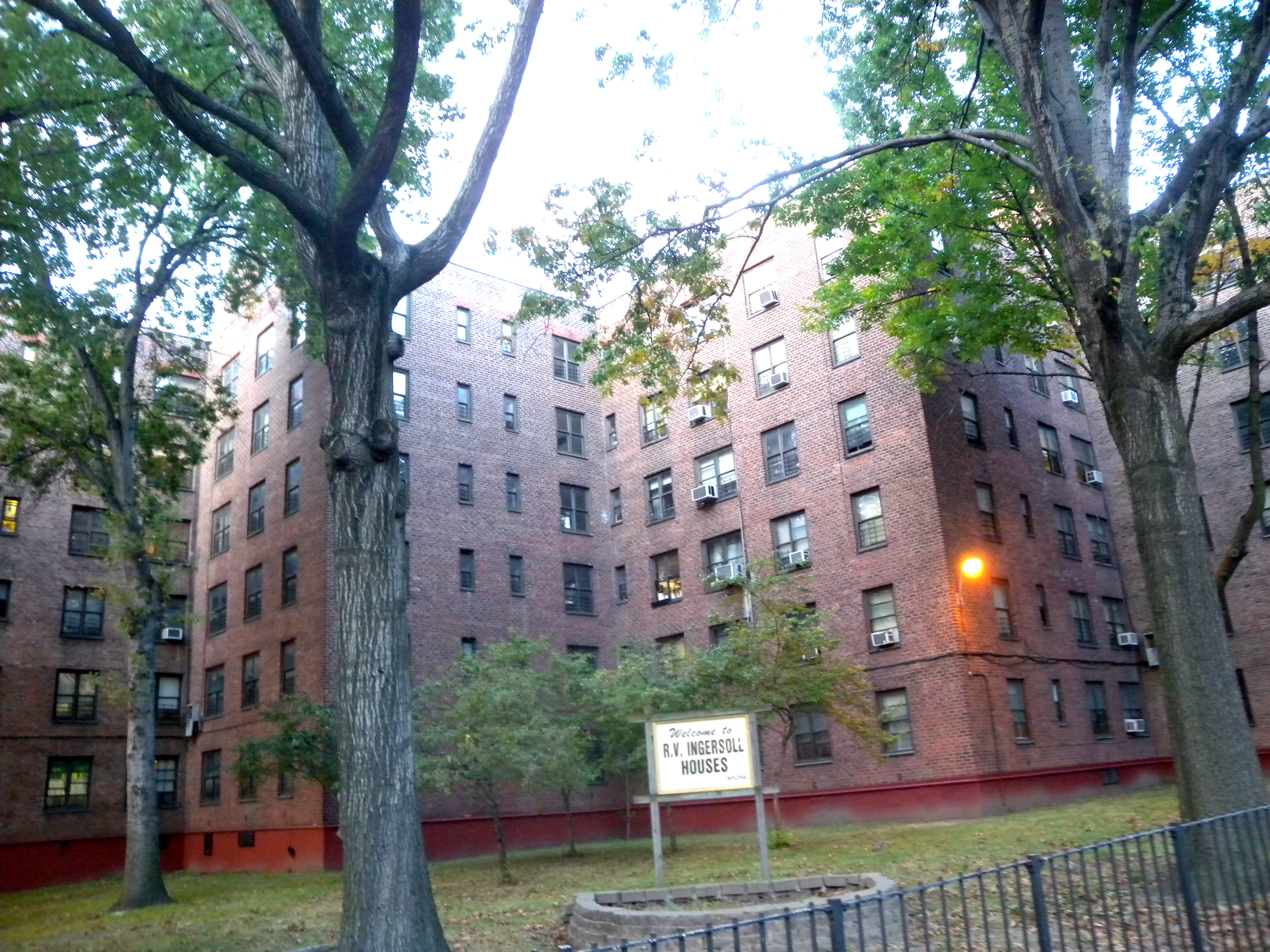
- Interactive map of Ingersoll Houses
- Country: United States
- State: New York
- City: New York City
- Borough: Brooklyn

Area
  - Total: 22.7 acres (9.2 ha)

Population
  - Total: 3,579
- Zip Codes: 11201 and 11205

The Ingersoll Houses is a housing complex owned by NYCHA that contains 19 residential buildings. The building numbering continues from the Walt Whitman Housing Complex and ranges from numbers 16 to 35. Buildings XVI-XX and XXIV-XXXIV have 6 stories while Buildings XXI-XXIII and also XXXV are 11 stories tall. They are located between St. Edward's to Prince Street and from Park Avenue/Tillary Street to Myrtle Avenue in Fort Greene, Brooklyn. There are currently 3,579 residents as of 2025. This housing complex was named after Raymond V. Ingersoll.

== History ==
These buildings were built in February 1944, along with Walt Whitman Houses.

In the 21st century, there have been many renovations for both this and Whit Whitman Houses. In 2009, the elevators were being replaced in here costs $37M and the apartment renovations for both cost about $50M and the upgrades of kitchens, floors, metal stairs, and electrical work for both costed $140M and also boiler replacements and upgrades were in design in this complex with funding for $7.78M.

In the summer of 2025, NYCHA's Asset and Capital Management division (A&CM) completed an exterior brickwork and the façade upgrade for both the Ingersoll Houses and the Red Hook Houses (West). The $38.2M project included the installation of newer improvements like masonry, structural beams, and drainage systems.

== See also ==
- New York City Housing Authority
