= Joseph C. H. Flynn =

American lawyer, politician, and judge

Joseph Charles Hugh Flynn (January 22, 1892 – June 26, 1941) was a lawyer, politician, and judge from New York.

== Life ==
Flynn was born on January 22, 1892, in Brooklyn, New York, the son of Hugh Flynn and Mary Curley. His cousin was Archbishop Michael Joseph Curley.

Flynn attended Brooklyn public schools and graduated from the Erasmus Hall High School. He spent several years working as a reporter for the Brooklyn Citizen, followed by the New-York Tribune. His brother Frank also worked as a reporter for both the Brooklyn Citizen and the New York Daily Mirror. He then studied at St. John's College and Fordham Law School. He graduated from the latter school in 1915, and in 1916 he was admitted to the bar. He was a secretary to New York Supreme Court Justice Leander B. Faber, although he resigned from the position in 1917 to serve as head of the Army Intelligence Bureau at Governors Island during World War I with the rank of sergeant.

In 1923, Flynn was elected to the New York State Assembly as a Republican, representing the Kings County 5th District. He served in the Assembly in 1924. While in the Assembly, he was responsible for considerable labor legislation. In 1924, he ran for the New York State Senate as a Republican in New York's 7th State Senate district. He lost the election to Democratic candidate John A. Hastings. In January 1925, New York Attorney General Albert Ottinger appointed him Deputy Attorney General.

In 1929, Flynn was elected president of the Kings County Republican Club. In 1931, he was unanimously elected Republican leader of the 5th Assembly District, succeeding Charles C. Lockwood (who served as district leader for the previous sixteen years). He was a delegate to the 1932 Republican National Convention. In January 1939, Mayor Fiorello La Guardia appointed and inducted him magistrate to fill an unexpired term. He was appointed to a full ten year term in April 1941. As magistrate, he was active in boys' welfare work and was a strong supporter of the Brooklyn Adolescents Court.

Flynn was attorney for the Catholic University of America and the Society for the Propagation of the Faith. He was a member of the Knights of Columbus and the American Legion. He was also active with the Catholic Club of New York, the Catholic Lawyers Guild, the Brooklyn Bar Association, and the American Bar Association. In 1925, he married Hope Virginia Boyle, niece of Charles C. Lockwood. Their only son was Joseph Hugh.

Flynn died from a heart attack at the Park Central Hotel, where he was having dinner with his father-in-law Dr. P. J. York, on June 26, 1941. Over a thousand people attended his funeral at the Holy Rosary Roman Catholic Church, with a large crowd and a detachment of uniformed policemen standing outside of the church. The honorary pallbearers included New York Court of Appeals Associate Judge Albert Conway, Appellate Division of the New York Supreme Court Justice John B. Johnston, New York Supreme Court Justices Charles C. Lockwood, John MacCrate, Peter P. Smith, Thomas J. Cuff, and Benedict Dineem, Chief Magistrate Henry Curran and other magistrates, Republican leader John R. Crews, Assemblyman Robert J. Crews, and a delegation from the Republican Club of the Fifth Assembly District (which Flynn was a leader of). A police radio patrol car escorted the funeral cortege to the burial at Holy Cross Cemetery.

New York State Assembly
Preceded by John Cashmore	New York State Assembly; Kings County, 5th District; 1924	Succeeded by John J. Cooney
