= Joseph Turow =

American professor of communication

Joseph Turow is the Robert Lewis Shayon Professor of Communication at the Annenberg School for Communication at the University of Pennsylvania. His research specialises in marketing, new media and privacy. A 2005 New York Times Magazine article referred to him as “probably the reigning academic expert on media fragmentation." In 2010, the New York Times called Turow “the ranking wise man on some thorny new-media and marketing topics."

== Career and research ==
From 1999 onward, his national surveys of the American public on issues relating to marketing, new media, and society have received a great deal of attention in the popular press as well as in the research community. In 2015, for example, he and two colleagues (Michael Hennessy and Nora Draper) brought evidence from a representative national telephone survey of Americans to support their hypothesis that internet marketers are incorrect when they assert Americans give up their data after rational analyses of the benefits and privacy costs of doing that. Rather, Americans give up their data because they are “resigned” to not being able to control data about them even though they want to do it. The findings started a wide-ranging discussion in the general press, the marketing trade press, and at the Federal Trade Commission.

Turow is an elected Fellow of the International Communication Association and was presented with a Distinguished Scholar Award by the National Communication Association. In 2012, the TRUSTe internet privacy-management organization designated him a "privacy pioneer" for his research and writing on marketing and digital-privacy. For about a decade, he served as the Annenberg School's Associate Dean for Graduate Studies.

=== Books ===
Turow is also the author of over 10 books and more than 150 articles on media industries. Among these are The Voice Catchers: How Marketers Listen In to Exploit Your Feelings, Your Privacy, and Your Wallet(2021),The Aisles Have Eyes: How Retailers Track Your Shopping, Strip Your Privacy, and Define Your Power (Yale University Press, 2017), The Daily You: How the New Advertising Industry is Defining Your Identity and Your World (Yale, 2012), Niche Envy: Marketing Discrimination in the Digital Age (MIT Press, 2006), Breaking Up America: Advertisers and the New Media World (University of Chicago Press, 1997; paperback, 1999)., and Playing Doctor: Television, Storytelling and Medical Power (Oxford, 1989 and Michigan, 2013). His introductory text, Media Today: Mass Communication in a Converging World (Routledge) is in its sixth edition . He has edited five other books about the changing media landscape, including (with Lokman Tsui) The Hyperlinked Society: Questioning Connections in the Digital Age (Michigan, 2008) (MIT Press, 2003) and (with Andrea Kavanaugh) The Wired Homestead (MIT Press, 2003).

=== Lectures ===
Turow has been invited to give several prestigious lectures, including the Lady Astor Lectureship at Oxford University, the McGovern Lecture at the University of Texas College of Communication, and the Chancellor’s Distinguished Lecture at Louisiana State University. His chair is named after Robert Lewis Shayon, who was a prominent CBS radio producer, Saturday Review TV critic and Annenberg professor.

== Graduate Student Unionization ==
In his role as Associate Dean for Graduate Studies at the Annenberg School, Turow testified on behalf of the University of Pennsylvania in relation to the unionization of its graduate students during the University of Pennsylvania vs. GETUP-UPENN National Labor Relations Board hearings. During his testimony, Turow noted the belief of many Annenberg Faculty that being a graduate teaching assistant is a key aspect of graduate education, and stated therefore that teaching assistants are fundamentally students, not employees. He admitted that large undergraduate classes would not be possible without graduate student teaching assistants but argued that Penn could instead hold smaller classes which would enable him to grade exams himself rather than relying on teaching assistants.

== Education and early career ==
Turow received his Ph.D. from the Annenberg School for Communication at the University of Pennsylvania in 1976 and was appointed to the faculty at Purdue University that year. In 1986, he returned to Penn’s Annenberg School as a faculty member.
