= Philip W. Jackson =

American pedagogue

Philip Wesley Jackson (December 2, 1928, in Vineland – July 21, 2015, in Chicago) was an American pedagogue who was professor emeritus at the University of Chicago. During his career, he also served as president of the American Educational Research Association and of the John Dewey Society. He coined the phrase "hidden curriculum" in his 1968 book entitled Life in Classrooms, in a section about the need for students to master the institutional expectations of school.

Cultural offices
| Preceded by Nancy Cole | President of the American Educational Research Association; 1989–1990 | Succeeded by Larry Cuban |
