= 1850 New York gubernatorial election =

- November 5, 1850
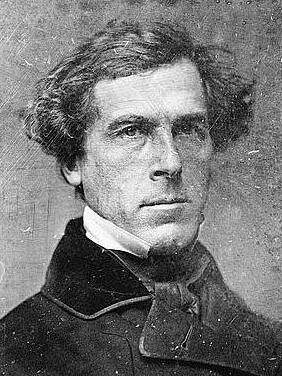

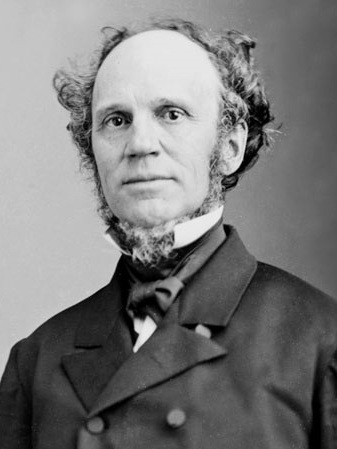
Nominee	Washington Hunt	Horatio Seymour
Party	Whig	Democratic
Alliance	Anti-Rent	Union
Popular vote	214,614	214,352
Percentage	49.64%	49.58%
- County results Hunt: 50–60% 60–70% Seymour: 40–50% 50–60% 60–70%
Governor before election
Hamilton Fish
Whig
Elected Governor
Washington Hunt
Whig

The 1850 New York gubernatorial election was held on November 7, 1850. Incumbent Governor Hamilton Fish was not a candidate for re-election. Washington Hunt was elected to succeed him, defeating Horatio Seymour in the latter's first run for governor. Seymour would go on to serve two terms in office and be nominated for President of the United States in 1868.

== Democratic nomination ==
=== Background ===
Following defeats in the Barnburner and Hunker factions reconciled in 1849. However, their joint ticket was only partly successful, as the Anti-Rent endorsement still controlled in 1849; anti-Rent candidates won every state office.

=== Results ===
At a convention in Syracuse on September 11, the Democrats nominated former Hunker Horatio Seymour for governor and former Barnburners for the remaining offices.

== Whig nomination ==
The Whig state convention met on September 27 in Utica; Francis Granger presided. After nominating Hunt, the majority passed a resolution thanking the state's junior U.S. senator William H. Seward for "the signal ability with which he has sustained ... those beloved principles of public policy so long cherished by the Whigs of the Empire State,"—a clear reference to Seward's opposition to the Compromise of 1850. In protest, Granger and other pro-Compromise allies of president Millard Fillmore withdrew from the convention. The conservative faction became known as the Silver Grays after Granger's white hair.

The Silver Grays reconvened at Utica on October 17; Granger again presided. In the interim, Hunt had issued a statement accepting the Compromise while calling for "essential modifications" of the Fugitive Slave Act of 1850. Satisfied, the convention reaffirmed the original nominations.

Some conservative Whigs still refused to support Hunt, however. These individuals threw their support behind the Democratic candidate for governor, Horatio Seymour, in hopes of initiating a political realignment in which pro-Compromise Whigs and Democrats would unite in a new Union Party. The New York Journal of Commerce printed a Union ticket headed by Seymour in advance of a Union Safety meeting held at Castle Garden in late October. The meeting adopted resolutions approving of the Compromise and vowing never to vote for any candidate known to be hostile to any of the Compromise measures, including the Fugitive Slave Act—a pledge that targeted Hunt specifically. Antislavery Whigs denounced the meeting as a transparent attempt to divide the Whig Party and elect Seymour under the guise of Unionism.

== General election ==
=== Candidates ===
- William L. Chaplin, general agent of the New York Anti-Slavery Society (Liberty) (Note: During the campaign and election, Chaplin was imprisoned in Washington, DC for his role in aiding the escape of two slaves, Allen and Garland H. White, owned by U.S. Representatives Alexander Stephens and Robert Toombs, respectively.)
- Washington Hunt, New York Comptroller (Whig and Anti-Rent)
- Horatio Seymour, former Speaker of the New York Assembly and mayor of Utica (Democratic and Union)

=== Results ===
Hunt won the election with one of the smallest majorities in New York history, only 262 votes. Four out of five candidates on the cross-endorsed Anti-Rent ticket were elected, showing their still present but waning influence.

1850 New York gubernatorial election
Party	Candidate	Votes	%	±%
Whig	Washington Hunt	214,614	49.64%	▲2.09
Democratic	Horatio Seymour	214,352	49.57%	▲24.18
Liberty	William L. Chaplin	3,416	0.79%	▲0.44
Total votes		432,382	100.00%	

== See also ==
- New York gubernatorial elections
- New York state elections
