= George Counts =

American educator and theorist

George Sylvester Counts
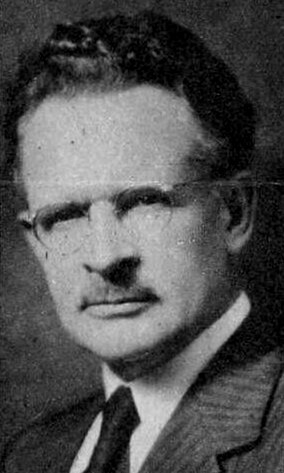
- Counts c. 1941

New York State Chairman of the American Labor Party
- In office August 21, 1942 – April 8, 1944
- Preceded by: Luigi Antonini
- Succeeded by: Sidney Hillman

Personal details
- Born: December 9, 1889 Baldwin City, Kansas, United States
- Died: November 10, 1974 (aged 84) Belleville, Illinois, United States
- Party: American Labor (before 1944); Liberal (after 1944)

George Sylvester Counts (December 9, 1889 – November 10, 1974) was an American educator and influential education theorist.

An early proponent of the progressive education movement of John Dewey, Counts became its leading critic affiliated with the school of Social reconstructionism in education. Counts is credited for influencing several subsequent theories, particularly critical pedagogy. Counts wrote dozens of important papers and 29 books about education. He was also highly active in politics as a leading advocate of teachers' unions, the head of the American Federation of Teachers, the founder of the New York State Liberal Party, and as a candidate for the U.S. Senate.

== Influences ==
Counts graduated from Baker University in 1911 with a Bachelor of Arts degree. He then became a high school principal, a science and math teacher, and an athletic coach before heading off to graduate school. While attending graduate school at the University of Chicago in 1913, Counts was influenced by John Dewey and Francis W. Parker. He planned on majoring in sociology until his brother-in-law encouraged him to go into education. Counts then decided he would major in education but minor in sociology and social science. During this time he was a student of Charles Hubbard Judd, a leading proponent of the science of education. It was uncommon during this time to combine a career in education with anything other than psychology. Counts took great pride in knowing he was Judd's first student to not minor in psychology. Counts earned a doctorate in education at the University of Chicago in 1916. His experience studying sociology under Albion W. Small during this period is attributed for encouraging Counts to concentrate on the sociological dimension of educational research.

== Profession ==
=== Early career ===
Counts' first position was head of the Department of Education at Delaware College from 1916–1918, then as a professor at Harris Teachers College in 1918. Counts taught at the University of Washington in 1919, then Yale in 1920. Then, in 1926, he taught at the University of Chicago. In 1924 he published The Principles of Education, (1924) with J. Crosby Chapman. During this period Counts favored Dewey's progressive education model of child-centered learning, and this book provided a broad overview of education from that perspective.

In 1926 Counts returned to the University of Chicago. The next year he began a remarkable tenure at Columbia University Teachers College. He remained here until he was forced to retire in 1955. In 1930 Counts wrote American Road to Culture a global perspective on education. In this book he identifies ten "controlling ideas" in U.S. education. He also talks about individual success, national solidarity, and philosophic uncertainty. Regarding this book's case about American schools, H. G. Wells said, "the complete ideological sterilization of the common schools of the Republic is demonstrated beyond question. The sterilization was deliberate."

=== Dare the School Build a New Social Order? ===
After publishing two comparative studies of the Soviet education system, The New Russian Primer. (1931) and The Soviet Challenge to America. (1931), Counts was invited to address to the Progressive Education Association. His papers, delivered over three separate speeches, formed the core of the book, Dare the School Build a New Social Order?, published in 1932. Counts provides a clear examination of the cultural, social and political purposes of education, and proponents the deliberate examination and navigation of teaching for political purposes.

In his address Counts proposed that teachers "dare build a new social order" through a complex, but definitely possible, process. He explained that only through schooling could students be educated for a life in a world transformed by massive changes in science, industry, and technology. Counts insisted that responsible educators "cannot evade the responsibility of participating actively in the task of reconstituting the democratic tradition and of thus working positively toward a new society." Counts' address to the PEA and the subsequent publication put him in the forefront of the social reconstructionism movement in education.

Conservative educators attacked the premise of Counts' assertion, and progressive educators recoiled at his criticism of their practices. W. E. B. Du Bois issued a rebuttal to Counts' assertions that teachers were capable of building a "new social order". In 1935 he spoke to a Georgia African American teacher's convention, curtly discounting the nature of the education system today.

=== Later career ===
Counts continued teaching at Columbia. Several of his students, including William Marvin Alexander, went on to notability in the field of education themselves. Counts retired in 1956.

From 1942 to 1944 Counts served as New York State chairman of the American Labor Party. In 1945 he established the Liberal Party in New York, he ran as its candidate for the United States Senate in 1952. Counts was the chairman of that party from 1955 to 1959. He was a member of the National Committee of the American Civil Liberties Union from 1940 to 1973, and was President of the American Federation of Teachers from 1939 to 1942.

Counts traveled to the Soviet Union several times in the course of his life, writing several books about Soviet education and comparing Soviet and American education systems. In the 1930s William Randolph Hearst used select statements from interviews with Counts to portray American university faculty as Communist Party sympathizers.

After retirement Counts served as a visiting professor at the University of Pittsburgh, Michigan State University and Southern Illinois University.

== Legacy ==
Counts' theories continue to draw support from modern educators.

== Bibliography ==
The New Russian Primer (1931) and The Soviet Challenge to America (1931) were Counts' first works, and Dare the School Build a New Social Order? (1932) is regarded as his seminal work. His other books include The Social Foundations of Education (1934); The Prospects of American Democracy (1938); The Country of the Blind (1949), and; Education and American Civilization (1952). He taught at Columbia University Teachers College for almost thirty years. His final publications included Education and the Foundations of Human Freedom (1952) and School and Society in Chicago (1971).

== Bibliography of writings on Counts ==
- Austin, J. George Counts at Teachers College, 1927-1941;: A study in unfulfilled expectations.
- Braun, R. (2002) Teachers and Power. Touchstone Publishers.
- Berube, M. (1988) Teacher Politics. Greenwood Press.
- Cremin, L.A. (1964) The transformation of the American school: Progressivism in American education 1876–1957. New York: Vintage.
- Dennis, L. (1990) George S. Counts and Charles A. Beard: Collaborators for Change. (SUNY Series in the Philosophy of Education). State Univ of New York Press.
- Gutek, G. (1970) The Educational Theory George S. Counts. Ohio: Ohio State University Press.
- JAY, CHARLES DUANE. "THE DOCTORAL PROGRAM OF GEORGE S. COUNTS AT THE UNIVERSITY OF CHICAGO (1913-1916): AN INTELLECTUAL HISTORY" (PhD dissertation, Southern Illinois University at Carbondale; ProQuest Dissertations Publishing, 1982. 8229283).
- Ornstein, A, & Levine, D. (1993) Foundations of Education. Boston: Houghton Mifflin Company.
- Sheerin, W. (1976) "Educational Scholarship and the Legacy of George S. Counts," Educational Theory 26(1), 107–112.

== See also ==
- Harold Rugg
- Theodore Brameld
- Charles A. Beard
- Education theory

Party political offices
Preceded by Herbert H. Lehman	Liberal nominee for U.S. senator from New York (Class 1); 1952	Succeeded by Frank Hogan
