= Dare the School Build a New Social Order? =

1932 collection of speeches by George S. Counts

- Author: George S. Counts
- Published: 1932 (John Day Company)
- Pages: 56
- OCLC: 974660781

Dare the School Build a New Social Order? is a collection of speeches by educator George S. Counts on the role and limits of progressive education.
