= Kenneth Keating =

American politician, diplomat, and judge (1900–1975)

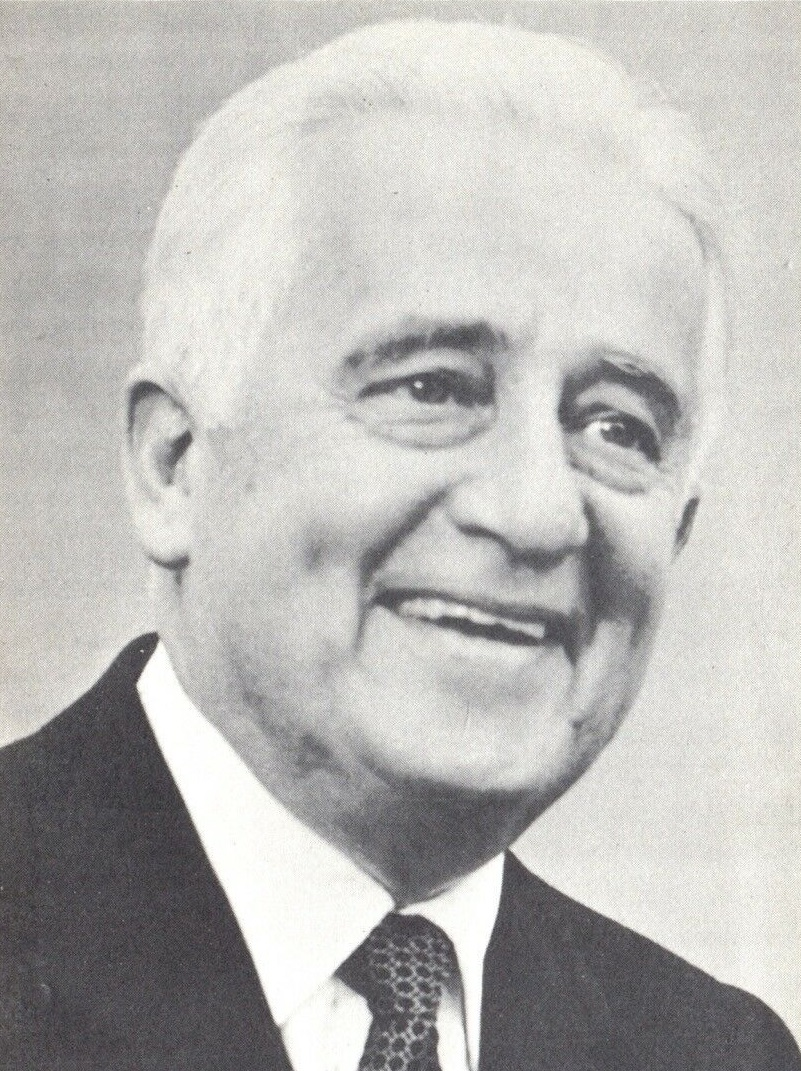
- Keating in 1964

6th United States Ambassador to Israel
- In office August 28, 1973 – May 5, 1975
- President: Richard Nixon; Gerald Ford
- Preceded by: Walworth Barbour
- Succeeded by: Malcolm Toon

8th United States Ambassador to India
- In office May 1, 1969 – July 26, 1972
- President: Richard Nixon
- Preceded by: Chester Bowles
- Succeeded by: Daniel Patrick Moynihan

Associate Judge of the New York Court of Appeals
- In office January 1, 1966 – May 20, 1969
- Preceded by: Marvin R. Dye
- Succeeded by: James Gibson

United States Senator from New York
- In office January 3, 1959 – January 3, 1965
- Preceded by: Irving Ives
- Succeeded by: Robert F. Kennedy

Member of the U.S. House of Representatives from New York
- In office January 3, 1947 – January 3, 1959
- Preceded by: George F. Rogers
- Succeeded by: Jessica M. Weis
- Constituency: 40th district (1947–1953); 38th district (1953–1959)

Personal details
- Born: May 18, 1900 Lima, New York, U.S.
- Died: May 5, 1975 (aged 74) New York City, New York, U.S.
- Resting place: Arlington National Cemetery
- Party: Republican
- Spouses: Louise DePuy (m. 1928; died 1968) Mary Pitcairn Davis (m. 1974)
- Children: 1
- Parents: Thomas Keating (father); Louise Barnard (mother)
- Education: University of Rochester (BA); Harvard University (LLB)
- Occupation: Politician; diplomat; judge
- Civilian awards: Order of Merit of the Italian Republic (Officer); Grand Cross of Merit of the Sovereign Military Order of Malta
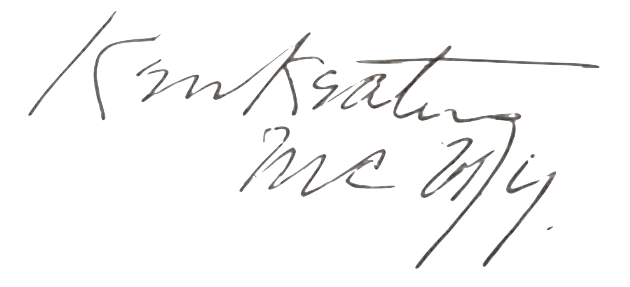
- Signature

Military service
- Allegiance: United States
- Branch/service: United States Army; Reserve Corps
- Years of service: 1918 (SATC); 1942–1946 (Army); 1946–1963 (Reserve)
- Rank: Brigadier General
- Unit: South East Asia Command (Army); Staff and Administrative Reserve Corps (Reserve)
- Conflict(s): World War I World War II
- Military awards: Legion of Merit (2); Order of the British Empire (Officer)

Kenneth Barnard Keating (May 18, 1900 – May 5, 1975) was an American politician, diplomat, and judge who served as a United States senator representing New York from 1959 until 1965. A member of the Republican Party, he also served in the United States House of Representatives, representing New York's 40th and 38th congressional districts from 1947 until 1959. Additionally, he served as a judge of the New York State Court of Appeals from 1966 until 1969 and was U.S. ambassador to India from 1969 until 1972 and Israel from 1973 until 1975.

A native of Lima, New York, Keating graduated from Genesee Wesleyan Seminary in 1915, before continuing to the University of Rochester where he graduated in 1919. He briefly became a teacher at East High School, before beginning attendance at Harvard Law School. After graduating in 1923, Keating practiced law in Rochester and became active in Republican Party politics. During World War I, Keating served with the Student Army Training Corps (SATC) at the University of Rochester. He joined the United States Army for World War II, and was commissioned as a major. He served in India as head of the U.S. office that managed the Lend-Lease Program for the China Burma India Theater and was promoted to colonel before the end of the war. Following the end of his wartime service, he continued to serve in the Organized Reserve Corps. He was promoted to brigadier general in 1948, and continued to serve until he retired in 1963.

In 1946, Keating successfully ran for a seat in the U.S. House, representing the Rochester-based 40th district. He defeated the incumbent Democrat who had won an upset victory over the incumbent Republican in 1944. After narrowly winning again over the Democrat in 1948, Keating was not seriously challenged for the House seat again. In 1952, he was redistricted to the 38th district. During his time in the House, Keating was very active in debate, floor amendment, and sponsorship of successful legislation. In his last congress in the House he was the ranking Republican on the Judiciary Committee. He was re-elected five times and developed a reputation as a moderate on many issues, though he adopted conservative positions on the Cold War and anti-communism, as well as the fight against organized crime.

In 1958, he successfully ran for a U.S. Senate seat from New York, and he served from 1959 to 1965. In the senate, Keating was an advocate of desegregation, and played a key role in breaking the filibuster that enabled passage of the Civil Rights Act of 1964. During the 1964 United States presidential election, he refused to endorse the conservative Republican nominee Barry Goldwater. Keating ran for re-election later that year but was defeated by Democrat Robert F. Kennedy. After leaving the senate, Keating briefly practiced law before becoming a judge of the New York Court of Appeals. He served until 1969, when he resigned to become U.S. Ambassador to India. He served as ambassador until 1972, when he resigned to campaign for the re-election of President Richard Nixon. In 1973, Nixon appointed Keating U.S. Ambassador to Israel, and Keating remained in this position until his death in 1975.

== Early life ==
Keating was born in Lima, New York on May 18, 1900, the son of Louise (Barnard) Keating, a schoolteacher, and Thomas Mosgrove Keating, a grocer. He was tutored by his mother until age seven, when he began attending the Lima public schools as a sixth grader. He graduated from high school at age 13 and attended Genesee Wesleyan Seminary, from which he graduated in 1915 as the class valedictorian. He graduated from the University of Rochester in 1919, and was a member of the Delta Upsilon fraternity and Phi Beta Kappa. He taught Latin and Greek for a year at Rochester's East High School, then began attendance at Harvard Law School. He graduated in 1923, was admitted to the bar, and commenced practice in Rochester. Keating's early forays into politics and government included service as town attorney for the town of Brighton, where he resided while practicing law in Rochester.

== Military service ==
During World War I, Keating served in the Student Army Training Corps (SATC) at the University of Rochester, where he attained the rank of sergeant. In April, 1942 Keating joined the Army for World War II and was commissioned as a major. He served initially as chief of the assignments branch in the international division of the Army Service Forces headquarters, and was promoted to lieutenant colonel in October, 1942.

In 1943, Keating was assigned to India as head of the Army Service Forces international office that administered the Lend-Lease Program for the China Burma India Theater, part of the South East Asia Command commanded by Lord Louis Mountbatten. He was promoted to colonel in February 1944 and in July 1944 he made an assessment tour of the theater's front lines with General Albert Coady Wedemeyer, Mountbatten's chief of staff, which took him to sixteen countries, including Ceylon, Burma, Indochina, and Java. Keating later served as executive assistant to Mountbatten's U.S. deputy, Lieutenant General Raymond Albert Wheeler, and was the senior American officer at the South East Asia Command's rear headquarters in India. In November 1945, Mountbatten dispatched Keating to London to provide British Parliament information on the post-war rebuilding of India. Keating closed out his wartime service as a liaison between the Army Services Forces and the British military office in Washington, D.C., and was awarded the Legion of Merit with Oak Leaf Cluster and the Order of the British Empire (Officer).

Keating remained in the Organized Reserve Corps after the war, and was promoted to brigadier general in 1948. He continued to serve until retiring from the military in 1963.

== U.S. House of Representatives ==
A Republican, Keating was a member of the New York delegation to every Republican National Convention from 1940 to 1964 with the exception of 1944, when he was overseas with the U.S. Army during World War II. On returning to the United States after the war, Keating ran successfully for a Rochester-area seat in the U.S. House of Representatives in the 1946 election. He was reelected five times, and served in the 80th, 81st, 82nd, 83rd, 84th and 85th United States Congresses (January 3, 1947 – January 3, 1959).

Keating was regarded as a liberal Republican on many issues, but adopted conservative positions on anticommunism during the Cold War and fighting organized crime. He supported the Truman Doctrine and Marshall Plan and sponsored an early civil rights bill. He opposed diplomatic recognition of "Red China" after the Chinese Civil War, and supported allowing the Federal Bureau of Investigation to use tactics including wiretaps on organized crime figures and suspected Communist sympathizers. As a senior member of the House Judiciary Committee, Keating was active in shepherding the Civil Rights Act of 1957 to passage. Keating also enhanced his public profile by creating a semi-monthly Rochester-area television show in which he discussed current events with government officials including fellow members of Congress, which increased his personal popularity among his House colleagues, who appreciated the opportunity to publicize their activities.

== U.S. Senate ==
In 1958 after winning the Republican nomination for a return to the House, he was prevailed upon by former New York Governor and twice presidential candidate Thomas E. Dewey, current gubernatorial candidate Nelson Rockefeller, and Vice Pres. Richard Nixon to declare for the convention nomination for the U.S. Senate seat held by the retiring Irving Ives. He defeated Democrat Frank Hogan, the New York County District Attorney for the seat. He served from January 3, 1959, to January 3, 1965 (the 86th, 87th and 88th Congresses) and was defeated for reelection in 1964 by Robert F. Kennedy. During his Senate term, Keating served on the Judiciary and Rules committees.

In 1960, Keating introduced the Twenty-Third Amendment to the United States Constitution, which allowed residents of the District of Columbia to vote in presidential elections. In 1962, before the Cuban Missile Crisis that began in October, Keating publicly cited a source who had informed him that the Soviet Union and Cuba had constructed intercontinental ballistic missile facilities in Cuba that could target the United States, and urged President John F. Kennedy to take action. After the CIA presented U-2 reconnaissance photographs of Soviet medium-range ballistic missiles in Cuba to the National Security Council, President Kennedy told his secretary Kenny O'Donnell "Ken Keating will probably be the next President of the United States." In April 1962, he joined Senator Hugh Scott of Pennsylvania in denouncing a UN resolution condemning Israeli retaliation against Syrian gun positions firing on Israeli fishermen on Lake Tiberias. They criticized the action as a form of evenhandedness that "looks like the palm of the hand for the Arabs and the back of the hand for the Israelis." He also worked with the bipartisan coalition that achieved passage of the Civil Rights Act of 1964 after it broke the filibuster organized by segregationist Democrats.

During the 1964 Republican National Convention, Keating staged a walkout of the majority of the New York delegation after conservative Barry Goldwater won the presidential nomination. In the general election campaign, Keating refused to endorse Goldwater, and did not campaign for him in New York. Keating outperformed Goldwater on election day, but was defeated for reelection by the Democratic nominee, Robert F. Kennedy, who had established residency in New York shortly before becoming a candidate. Keating accused Kennedy of "carpetbagging", but Democratic strength in what proved to be a wave election nationwide was sufficient to propel Kennedy to victory.

== Later career ==
=== Appeals court judge ===
In 1965, Keating was elected to the New York Court of Appeals. He served until resigning in 1969. Though elected to a 14-year term, New York required judges to retire at age 70. Because he was in his 60s when elected, Keating desired to make a mark in what he anticipated would be a short tenure. As a result, in his brief time on the bench, he authored more than 100 opinions.

Keating's judicial philosophy was that precedent was binding, but only to the extent that it made sense in the context of the current case and times; he disagreed with following precedent for its own sake. He also disagreed with the concept of distinguishing cases if the effect of the court's decision was to overrule them. In Keating's view, if a precedent was to be overturned, it should simply be overturned; attempts to distinguish cases by parsing language or selectively picking and choosing case details were confusing to attorneys and judges because they amounted to dishonest reasoning.

In Liberty National Bank v. Buscaglia, Keating rejected the argument that national banks should be exempt from paying state taxes on the grounds that they were instruments of the federal government. In Keating's view, national banks had changed so much since the 1819 McCulloch v. Maryland decision gave them the exemption from state taxes that the McCulloch precedent no longer applied. In Gallagher v. St. Raymond's Roman Catholic Church, Keating's opinion overturned the precedent that the owner of a building to which the public was invited had no duty to illuminate the building's outside stairway. Keating argued that while the precedent made sense in the eras of candles, lanterns and gas lighting, which were not universally accessible, the availability of electric lighting nearly everywhere had rendered it obsolete. In Flanagan v. Mount Eden General Hospital, the court overruled the common law tradition that the statute of limitations in medical malpractice actions which involved instruments left inside a patient began to run from the commission of the act. Keating's opinion argued that logically, the statute of limitations should begin at the point where the patient first became aware of the instrument that had not been retrieved.

=== Ambassador to India ===
In 1969, Keating was appointed U.S. Ambassador to India, which enabled him to make use of the goodwill and contacts he had established during his World War II military service. His tenure was regarded as a success for U.S.-India relations until its last few months, when the Nixon Administration tacitly supported Pakistan in the Bangladesh Liberation War. India conducted a successful war against Pakistan which lasted two weeks and resulted in the transformation of East Pakistan into the independent state of Bangladesh.

As a result of U.S. support for Pakistan in the conflict, America suspended economic aid to India, and India closed five American cultural centers. Keating remained in India until 1972, when he returned to the United States to campaign for the reelection of President Richard M. Nixon.

=== Ambassador to Israel ===
He served as Ambassador to Israel from August 1973 until his death. Keating's ambassadorship was high profile; he built a network of contacts and conducted one on one diplomacy by entertaining frequently at his home in the Tel Aviv suburbs. Despite his efforts, members of the Israeli government were reportedly unhappy with his work, and expressed skepticism about the quality of the reports he sent to the U.S. State Department in Washington. In one instance, Israel's government claimed Keating had misinformed U.S. Secretary of State Henry Kissinger about the effects of public opinion in Israel on how much compromising its government could do in attempting to reach agreement with Egypt on the Israeli occupation of the Sinai Peninsula.

== Death and burial ==
Keating suffered a heart attack on April 17, 1975, while visiting his daughter in New Jersey, and was admitted to Columbia-Presbyterian Medical Center in New York City. He died in the hospital on May 5. Keating's funeral was held at St. John's Episcopal Church in Washington, and he was buried at Arlington National Cemetery.

== Personal life ==
=== Family ===
In 1928, Keating was married to Louise DePuy, who died in 1968. In 1974, he married Mary Leet Pitcairn (d. 2009), the former wife of William Harding Jackson and former secretary for General Omar N. Bradley. She was the widow of attorney Wendell Davis, who had been a law school classmate of Keating. In addition to his second wife, Keating was survived by his daughter, Judith Keating Howe of Short Hills, New Jersey.

=== Civil and professional memberships ===
Keating was a member of American Bar Association, New York State Bar Association, and Rochester Bar Association. He belonged to the American Legion, Veterans of Foreign Wars, Association of the United States Army, and Reserve Officers Association. He was also a member of the Sons of the American Revolution and Sons of Union Veterans of the Civil War. Keating was active in Freemasonry, and attained the 33rd Degree of the Scottish Rite. In addition, his fraternal memberships included the Kiwanis, Elks, Moose, and Eagles. Keating belonged to the American Political Science Association, and received the organization's first Congressional Distinguished Service Award.

== Legacy ==
In 1959, Keating received the Order of Merit of the Italian Republic (Officer) to recognize his work on behalf of post-World War II Italian immigrants. In 1961, Keating was awarded the Grand Cross of Merit of the Sovereign Military Order of Malta, an award presented by the order to recognize non-Catholics who whose personal and professional lives espouse goodwill towards the Catholic Church.

The federal building in Rochester is named for Keating. Brooklyn Law School awards the annual Judge Kenneth B. Keating Memorial Prize to a member of each graduating class who demonstrates exceptional achievement in the field of conflict of laws. The Kenneth Barnard Keating Papers are part of the Rare Books, Special Collections and Preservation holdings at the University of Rochester. Senator Keating Boulevard in the town of Brighton, a road which was constructed in the late 1990s, is named for Keating.

=== Honorary degrees ===
Keating received several honorary degrees, to include:

- University of Rochester, LL.D., 1954
- Hobart and William Smith Colleges, LL.D., 1959
- Hamilton College, LL.D., 1959
- Le Moyne College, LL.D., 1959
- Albany Law School of Union University, LL.D., 1959
- Alfred University, DHL, 1960.
- Long Island University, LL.D., 1960
- Yeshiva University, DHL, 1962,
- Adelphi University, LL.D., 1962
- Iona University, LL.D., 1962
- Clarkson University, DHL, 1964
- Elmira College, D.Litt., 1964
- Pace University, DCL, 1965
- New York Medical College, DHL, 1965.
- Rhode Island College, LL.D., 1965.

Party political offices
| Preceded by Irving Ives | Republican nominee for U.S. Senator from New York (Class 1); 1958, 1964 | Succeeded by Charles Goodell |
U.S. House of Representatives
| Preceded by George F. Rogers | Member of the U.S. House of Representatives from New York's 40th congressional district 1947–1953 | Succeeded by William E. Miller |
| Preceded by John Taber | Member of the U.S. House of Representatives from New York's 38th congressional district 1953–1959 | Succeeded by Jessica M. Weis |
| Preceded by Chauncey W. Reed | Ranking Member of the House Judiciary Committee; 1956–1959 | Succeeded by William Moore McCulloch |
U.S. Senate
| Preceded by Irving Ives | U.S. Senator (Class 1) from New York; 1959–1965; Served alongside: Jacob K. Javits | Succeeded by Robert F. Kennedy |
Diplomatic posts
| Preceded by Chester Bowles | United States Ambassador to India; 1969–1972 | Succeeded by Daniel P. Moynihan |
| Preceded by Walworth Barbour | United States Ambassador to Israel; 1973–1975 | Succeeded by Malcolm Toon |
