= Irving Ives =

American politician

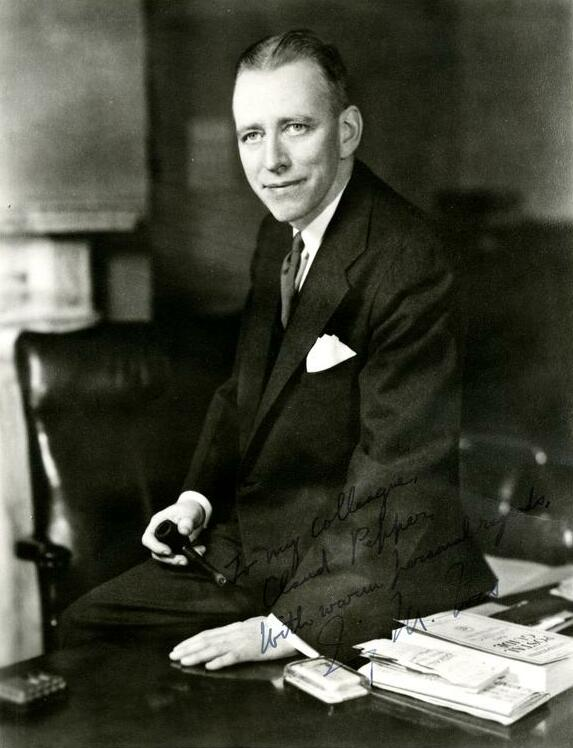
- Portrait, c. 1950

United States Senator from New York
- In office January 3, 1947 – January 3, 1959
- Preceded by: James M. Mead
- Succeeded by: Kenneth Keating

Speaker of the New York State Assembly
- In office January 1, 1936 – December 31, 1936
- Preceded by: Irwin Steingut
- Succeeded by: Oswald D. Heck

Member of the New York State Assembly from Chenango County
- In office February 11, 1930 – December 31, 1946
- Preceded by: Bert Lord
- Succeeded by: Janet Hill Gordon

Personal details
- Born: Irving McNeil Ives; January 24, 1896 Bainbridge, New York, U.S.
- Died: February 24, 1962 (aged 66) Norwich, New York, U.S.
- Party: Republican
- Spouses: Elizabeth Skinner (m. 1920; died 1947) Marion Crain (m. 1948)
- Children: 1
- Education: Hamilton College
- Occupation: Politician, banker, insurance agent

Military service
- Allegiance: United States
- Branch/service: United States Army
- Years of service: 1917-1919
- Rank: First Lieutenant
- Unit: 5th Division
- Battles/wars: World War I

Academic work
- Institutions: Cornell University

Irving McNeil Ives (January 24, 1896 – February 24, 1962) was an American politician and founding dean of the Cornell University School of Industrial and Labor Relations. A Republican, he served as a United States Senator from New York from 1947 to 1959. He was previously a member of the New York State Assembly for sixteen years, serving as Minority Leader (1935), Speaker (1936), and Majority Leader (1937–1946). A liberal Republican, he was known as a specialist in labor and civil rights legislation. Ives voted in favor of the Civil Rights Act of 1957.

== Early life and education ==
Irving Ives was born in Bainbridge, New York, to George Albert and Lucie Hough (née Keeler) Ives. His ancestors came from England to the United States, where they settled in Boston, Massachusetts in 1635; they later helped found Quinnipiac Colony in 1638, and lived in Vermont before moving to New York in 1795. His father worked in the coal and feed business. He received his early education at public schools in Bainbridge and Oneonta, graduating from Oneonta High School in 1914.

Ives attended Hamilton College for two years before enlisting in the U.S. Army following the entry of the United States into World War I in 1917. During the war, he served with the 5th Division in France and Germany, assigned primarily to the 61st Infantry Regiment. He participated in the Meuse-Argonne and Saint-Mihiel campaigns and was honorably discharged as a first lieutenant in 1919. He then resumed his studies at Hamilton, where he received a Bachelor of Arts degree in 1920 and graduated as a member of Phi Beta Kappa society.

== Early career ==
Ives worked as a bank clerk for Guaranty Trust Company in New York City from 1920 to 1923, earning $25 per week. In 1920, he married Elizabeth Minette Skinner, to whom he remained married until she died in 1947; the couple had one son, George. Joining Manufacturers Trust Company in 1923, he was placed in charge of the bank's business activity in Upstate New York and subsequently moved to Norwich. He remained with Manufacturers Trust until 1930, when he entered the general insurance business in Norwich.

On February 18, 1930, Ives was elected to the New York State Assembly (Chenango Co.) to fill the vacancy caused by the resignation of Bert Lord. He was reelected many times and remained in the Assembly until 1946, sitting in the 153rd, 154th, 155th, 156th, 157th, 158th, 159th, 160th, 161st, 162nd, 163rd, 164th and 165th New York State Legislatures.

Ives was Minority Leader in 1935 and Speaker in 1936. His reelection as Speaker was opposed by his fellow liberal Republicans, who disagreed with his opposition to Governor Herbert H. Lehman's proposed social welfare program. Ives stepped aside in favor of Oswald D. Heck, who subsequently named Ives Majority Leader. He served in that position from 1937 to 1946.

From 1938 to 1946, Ives was chairman of the State Joint Legislative Committee on Industrial and Labor Conditions. In that position he earned nationwide attention for sponsoring the Ives-Quinn Act of 1945, the first state law to prohibit discrimination in employment on the basis of race, creed, color, or national origin. Ives also introduced legislation to create the state Department of Commerce and to establish the New York State School of Industrial and Labor Relations at Cornell University, of which he was dean from 1945 to 1947. He also served as a member of the New York State War Council (1942 – 1946), chairman of the New York State Temporary Commission Against Discrimination (1944 – 1945), and chairman of the New York State Temporary Commission on Agriculture (1945 – 1946).

== U.S. Senate ==
In 1946, when Democratic incumbent James M. Mead decided to run for Governor of New York, Ives successfully ran for Mead's seat in the United States Senate. He faced former Governor Lehman in the general election, during which he became the first Republican to be endorsed by the New York American Federation of Labor. He defeated Lehman by a margin of 52% to 47%. Ives was the first Republican to represent New York in the Senate since James W. Wadsworth Jr., who was defeated for reelection in 1926.

Despite his moderate reputation, Ives supported the Taft–Hartley Act in 1947 and voted to override President Harry S. Truman's veto of it; he subsequently lost his longstanding support from labor unions. He served as a delegate to the 1948 Republican National Convention in Philadelphia, Pennsylvania, which nominated his friend and fellow liberal New Yorker Thomas E. Dewey. That same year he married his longtime secretary, Marion Mead Crain.

Ives was elected to a second term in 1952, defeating Brooklyn borough president John Cashmore by 55% to 36%. He received the largest number of votes hitherto ever won by a candidate in New York, carrying all but three of the state's 62 counties. A strong supporter of General Dwight D. Eisenhower, he served as a delegate to the 1952 Republican National Convention in Chicago, Illinois.

In 1954, Ives unsuccessfully ran to succeed Dewey as governor of New York. In one of the closest gubernatorial elections in state history, he lost to Democrat W. Averell Harriman by 11,125 votes. Ives was a delegate to the 1956 Republican National Convention in San Francisco, California. In 1958, he co-sponsored a bill with Senator John F. Kennedy to correct abuses within organized labor as disclosed in hearings before the Rackets Committee.

== Later life and death ==
In 1958, Ives declined to seek a third term in the Senate. He died at Chenango Memorial Hospital in Norwich, New York at age 66. He is buried at Greenlawn Cemetery in Bainbridge, New York.

== Legacy ==
Ives is remembered with his desk in the permanent collections of the Chenango County Historical Society. Ives Hall at Cornell University is named for him.

New York State Assembly
Preceded by Bert Lord	New York State Assembly; Chenango County; 1930–1946	Succeeded by Janet Hill Gordon
Political offices
Preceded by Irwin Steingut	Minority Leader in the New York State Assembly; 1935	Succeeded by Irwin Steingut
Preceded by Irwin Steingut	Speaker of the New York State Assembly; 1936	Succeeded by Oswald D. Heck
Preceded by Oswald D. Heck	Majority Leader of the New York State Assembly; 1937–1946	Succeeded by Lee B. Mailler
U.S. Senate
Preceded by James M. Mead	U.S. Senator (Class 1) from New York; 1947–1959	Succeeded by Kenneth Keating
Party political offices
Preceded by Bruce Fairchild Barton	Republican nominee for U.S. Senator from New York (Class 1); 1946, 1952	Succeeded by Kenneth Keating
Preceded by Thomas E. Dewey	Republican Nominee for Governor of New York; 1954 lost	Succeeded by Nelson Rockefeller
