= Factory model school =

Discussion term in the American education system

"Factory model schools", "factory model education", "industrial era schools", "industrial models" are ahistorical discussion terms that emerged in the mid to late-20th century and are used by writers and speakers as a rhetorical device by those advocating changes to American schools. Educational historians describe the phrase as misleading and an inaccurate representation of the development of American public education. Education historian Sherman Dorn offers:

Fundamentally, it makes no sense to talk about either “the industrial era” or the development of public school systems as a single, coherent phase of national history... Of course there is a relationship between economic developments and the way people argue about schooling, because there is a long history of associating schooling with upward mobility and social needs. But those economic arguments have always competed with other arguments about the purposes of schooling, and the institutional developments in schooling do not neatly match up against economic history.

The phrase is typically used as a way to set up advocacy for a project or idea the author supports. For example, In Choosing Schools: Consumer Choice and the Quality of American Schools (2000) Mark Schneider, Paul Eric Teske, Melissa Marschall wrote, "... in response to decades of intense immigration, the dominance of assembly line production techniques, and the sway of scientific management, the system of education in the United States had taken the shape evident today. Critics often call this the "factory model" of schools." Angeline Stoll Lillard wrote, "First, conventional schools are modeled on factories, because the birth of mass public schooling coincided with the age of efficiency" in Montessori, a book about progressive educator Maria Montessori. Lillard's book would later be cited by others including Geoff Masters, in his book The Children We Leave Behind: How School Could Be Done Differently (2026). Ted Dintersmith, author of What School Could Be: Insights and Inspiration from Teachers across America (2018), used the term in a graphic to describe the evolution of the American education system. In the graphic, "factory model" is connected to the year 1893 (the year the NEA Committee of Ten published their final report) and the goal of training "factory workers."

The phrases are also used to incorrectly suggest the look of American education hasn't changed since the 19th century.

== History of the terms ==
The first public use of the term "factory model schools" to describe K-12 education was likely in a speech by Dr. Howard Lamb in September 1972. The Greenville News reported: "The educational institutions are producing teachers for the 1920 factory model schools, Lamb said." Previously, Theresa Jablonski, in a 1970 editorial in the News Herald (Franklin, Pennsylvania), referenced "factory model of education" to describe college classrooms.

The phrase was used by authors in the 1980s and 90s, including Marilyn Roth of the National Education Association in 1987. Al Shanker, the president of the American Federation of Teachers, referenced the concept in a 1989 speech, "The Revolution that is Overdue: From Information Factory to Learning and Teaching in Restructuring Schools." Dr Leslie A. Hart's 1989 piece in The Phi Delta Kappa, "The Horse is Dead", connected the term to Horace Mann's experiences in Prussia in 1843 as was cited in numerous educational philosophy and theory texts in the 1990s and 2000s.

Another frequently cited author who used the concept in his writing was John Taylor Gatto. For example, his 2009 book Weapons of Mass Instruction, he linked Horace Mann to Prussian factories though factories of that era did not resemble modern factories. Gatto also used the ahistorical factory framing in his book Underground History of American (2000) which has been cited by numerous authors include Todd Rose in his book, The End of Average and Nikhil Goyal in his book, Schools on Trial (2016).

== As a metaphor ==
In some cases, authors have used the term "factory model" as a metaphor. As a modern example, the animation and text of Sir Ken Robinson's TED Talk compares students in schools to materials in a factory and references children's "date of manufacturing" as a sorting mechanism. The clearest example of this in historical writing is in the research of Raymond E. Callahan, especially in Education and the Cult of Efficiency (1962). Callahan explored the relationship between public education and the emerging concept of Scientific Management in the 1910s and included quotes by school leaders who spoke of children as the "raw goods" schools were meant to mold into something better. The most prolific user of this analogy was Ellwood Patterson Cubberley. He saw the logical, methodical approach of scientific management as a way for public education to adapt to influxes of children entering the system and to ensure the best outcomes. Cubberley wrote numerous guides for school administrators as well as a history book and was one of the most widely read educational authors of the 1910s and 1920s. He frequently used the metaphor of school as a factory:

Our schools are, in a sense, factories, in which the raw products (children) are to be shaped and fashioned into products to meet the various demands of life. The specifications for manufacturing come from the demands of twentieth-century civilization, and it is the business of the school to build its pupils according to the specifications laid down.

However, Cubberley also warned against treating schools like factories. In 1926, he warned in a textbook for school superintendents that:

A superintendent whose conception of educational administration is that of clockwork, machinery, inspections, and uniform output, and who runs the educational department much as he would run a factory...will not only fail to develop strength and individuality on the part of those who do the real work of the schools, but will crush out what of these qualities the workers may possess.

A theory that informed school leaders during this period was the work of Frederick Taylor. His approach to time management was known as Taylorism and it influenced multiple aspects of American society, including education. An example of its adoption in the home are the experiences of Lillian and Frank Gilbreth, whose scientific approach to parenting was described in their son's book Cheaper By the Dozen. In schools, this philosophical approach - that any problem could be solved by breaking it down into smaller units and considering time costs - was used in a variety of ways. For example, a group of English teachers in 1913 aggregated how much time they spent grading papers and used their findings to appeal to school leaders for more time to grade and provide feedback.

While teachers would use Taylorism to their advantage and to plead their case, they also spoke up against it and its impact on their work. In 1903, Margaret Haley chided school administrators for failing to recognize teachers' hard work and a tendency toward "factory-izing education" and "making the teacher an automaton, a mere factory hand, whose duty it is to carry out mechanically and unquestioningly the ideas and orders of those clothed with the authority of position." Some educational historians in the modern era question the popularity of Taylorism in schools and suggest it may not be as widespread as was believed; offering that the framework of "social engineering" and "scientific management" needs to be better situated within critical race theory and studies of gender, race, and disability.

David B. Tyack, a leader in the field of educational history, provided a context for this usage in his history of American urban education, The One Best System (1974). "Just as eighteenth-century theologians could think of God as a clock-maker without derogation, so the social engineers searching for new organizational forms used the words 'machine' and 'factory' without investing them with the negative associations they evoke today." Larry Cuban, another education historian, connects the metaphor to a particular mindset around the purpose of education. In Pillars of the Republic, Common Schools and American Society, 1780-1860, Carl Kaestle (1983) offers:

Schools thus became in some respects like factories, but not necessarily because they were mimicking factories, or preparing children to work in factories. Rather, both the workplace and the schools, as well as other nineteenth-century institutions, were partaking of the same ethos of efficiency, manipulation, and mastery. (p. 69)

== Problems with the terms ==
The most common reference to the factory model is typically: "Schools are based on factories, therefore [suggested reform]." This is an example of a false premise as the first part of the argument is not accurate. When making this argument, authors will typically cite authors such Cubberley, Gatto or Lillard or primary sources such as Horace Mann's reports in the 1840s and the 1892 Committee of Ten Report.

Mann presented his thoughts following his trip to Prussia in a report to the Massachusetts Board of Education. He filed several reports and his 7th annual report, published in January 1844, focused on his experiences in Europe, including Prussia.

... if Prussia can pervert the benign influences of education to the support of arbitrary power, we surely can employ them for the support and perpetuation of republican institutions. A national spirit of liberty can be cultivated more easily than a national spirit of bondage; and if it may be made one of the great prerogatives of education to perform the unnatural and unholy work of making slaves, then surely it must be one of the noblest instrumentalities for rearing a nation of freemen. If a moral power over the understandings and affections of the people may be turned to evil, may it not also be employed for good?

— Horace Mann, Seventh Annual Report of the Secretary of the Board of Education, p. 23

An 1867 summary of Mann's speeches describe how he was focused on public education as a means "to elevate the intellectual and moral character of the Commonwealth."

The final report by the National Education Association's Committee of Ten was a summary of the most common high school structures in the era and advocated for continued instruction in Latin, Greek, English, modern languages, mathematics, physics, astronomy, and chemistry, natural history, history, civil government, and political economy, and geography.

Critics of the use of the phrase have pointed out how factories that existed around the time of Mann, the spread of the common school movement, and the late 1800s don't resemble factories in the way we think of them today. While some historians have emphasized the influence of merchants and manufacturers on the rise of the common school movement, others have argued that the focus of education for most of American history, especially at the primary levels, has been about general knowledge and citizenship.

== Facilities ==
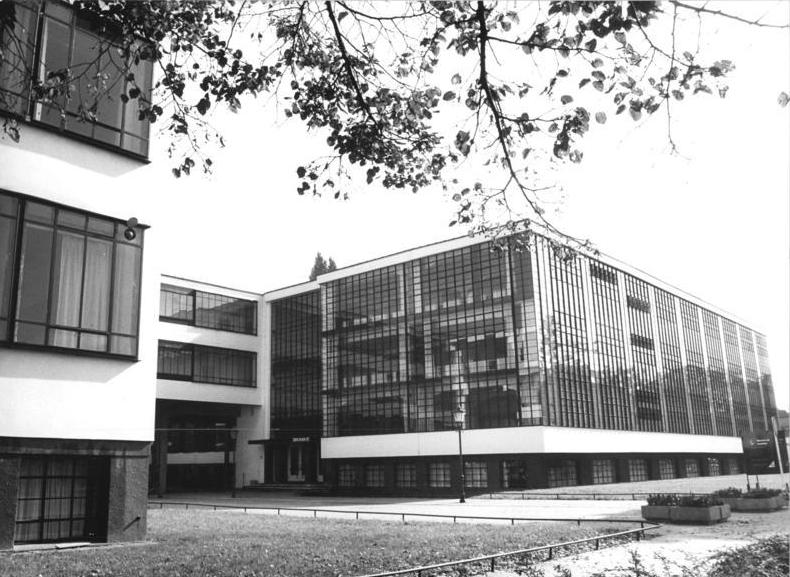
Bauhaus Dessau Workshop

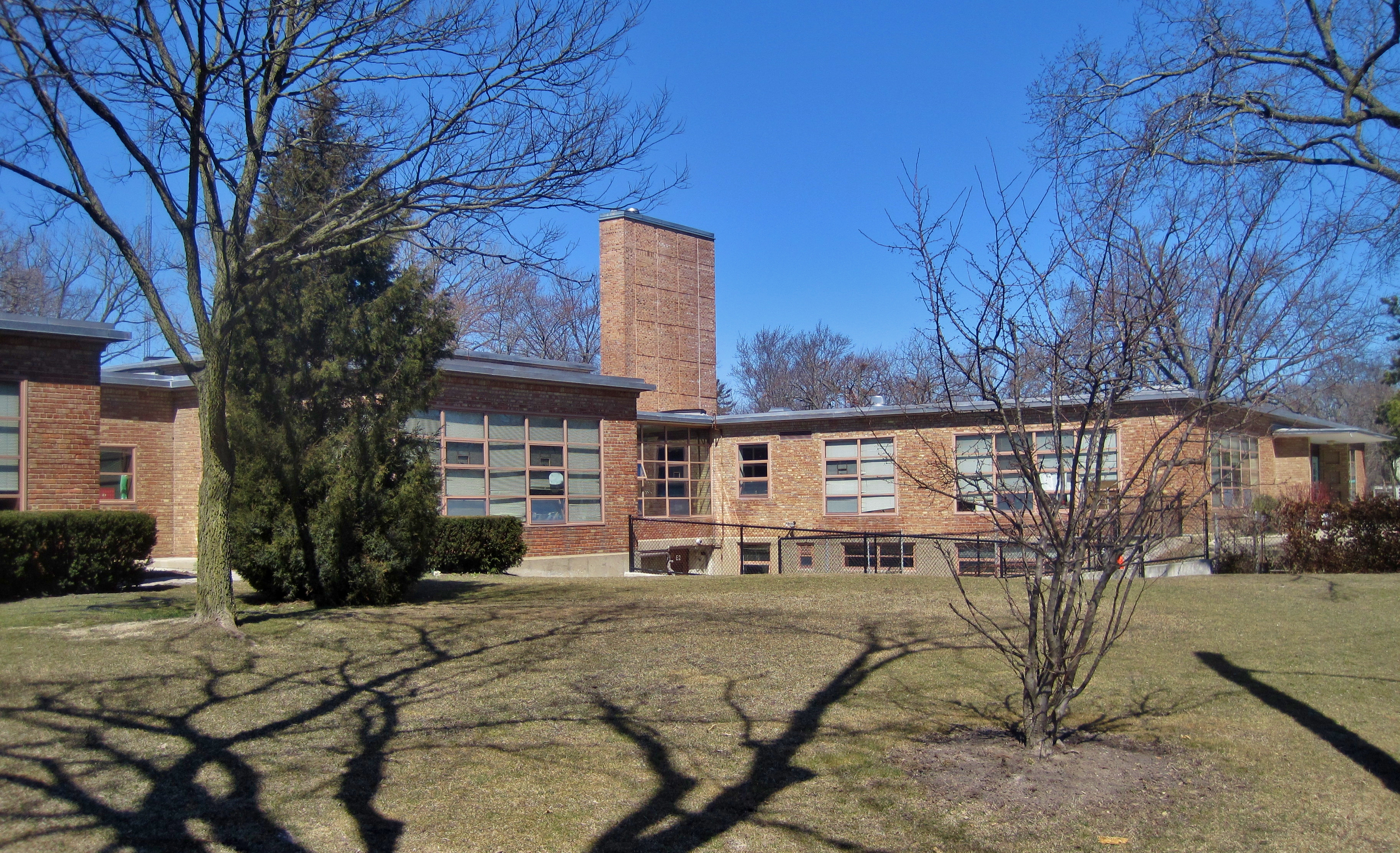
Crow Island School, constructed 1940

"Factory model classrooms" is also a term used by architects to describe a particular approach to design. Unlike the single-room schoolhouse in which all students of all ages are in the same space, "factory model classrooms" tend to be of a similar size and configuration, 800-900 square feet, with approximately 28-35 students of about the same age. As single-room schools became larger, this model was replicated, with the classrooms created as a series of boxes, often along a long double-loaded corridor (with classrooms on each side). This approach to school design is also described as "cells and bells" by architects and at the high school level is frequently used in conjunction with departmental model schools.

Efficiency in design was a key determinant of school design as early as the 1920s, with John Joseph Donovan's 1921 seminal School Architecture: Principles and Practices, calling for schools to be "tested in the abstract for efficiency and adequacy." One example of this type of efficient design is the Bauhaus in Dessau, Germany.

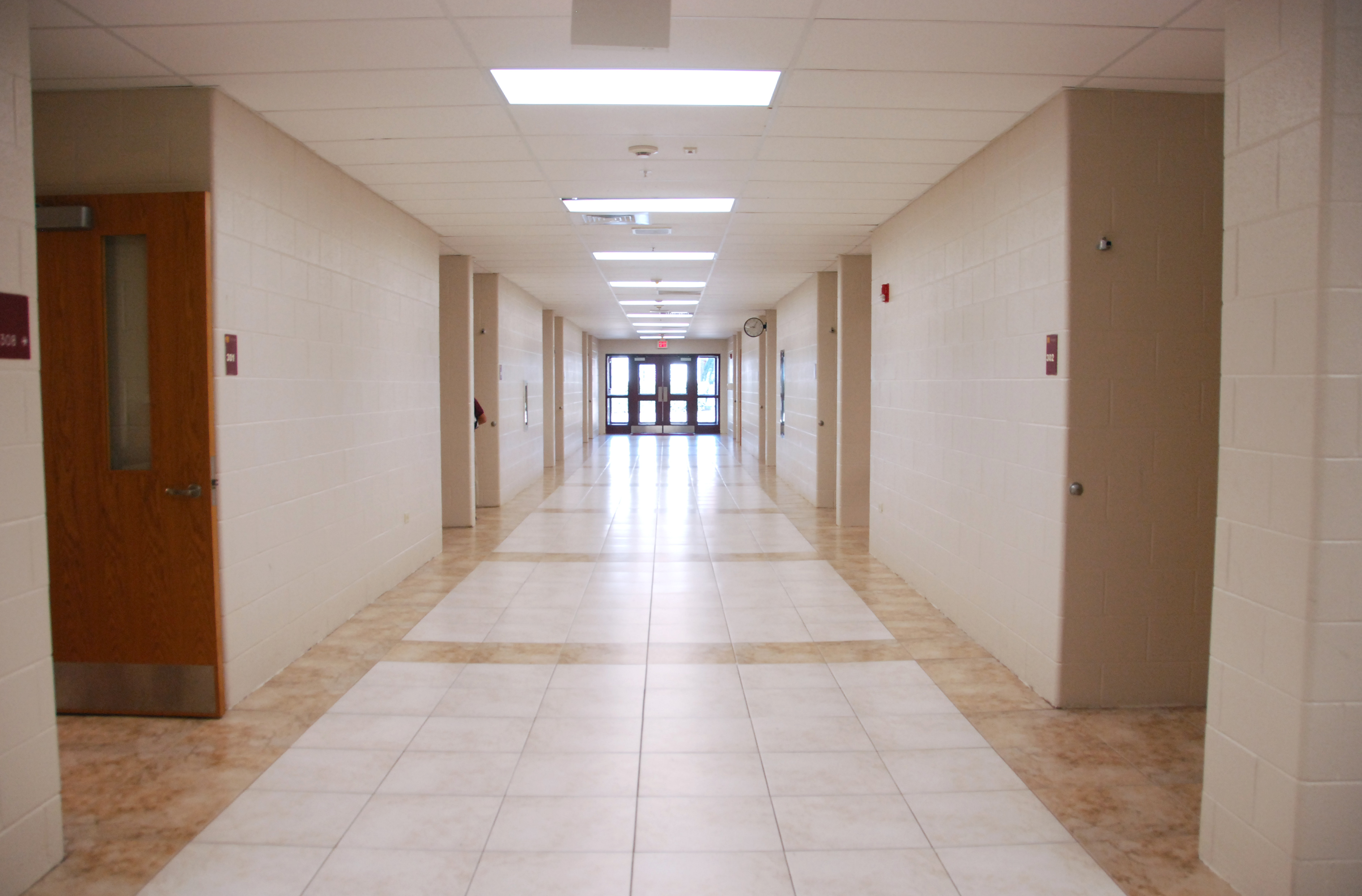
"Cells and bells": double-loaded school corridor with concrete block walls

This "cells and bells" model became a common approach to design but was not universal. The Crow Island School, which opened in 1940 in Illinois, was designed to support a progressive education and personalized model while also using aesthetics and forms that would soon become part of the modern or International Style. Some school architects would copy the look of Crow Island, but not the philosophical approach.

The primary design impetus of many American schools following an increase in enrollment due to the arrival of Baby Boomers in school was to renovate unsafe or overcrowded facilities, remove inadequate temporary classrooms, commonly referred to as "portables," and accommodate as many children as possible. In some places, schools experimented with innovative approaches to school design, but the "cells and bells" model is the most common.

== See also ==
- History of education in the United States
