= Necessary Illusions =

1989 book by Noam Chomsky

Necessary Illusions: Thought Control in Democratic Societies
- First edition
- Author: Noam Chomsky
- Publisher: South End Press, Pluto Press
- Publication date: June 1989
- Media type: Print (Paperback)
- Pages: 422
- ISBN: 0-89608-366-7
- OCLC: 19457706
- Dewey Decimal: 302.2/3 19
- LC Class: P95.8 .C48 1989

Necessary Illusions: Thought Control in Democratic Societies is a 1989 book by United States academic Noam Chomsky concerning political power using propaganda to distort and distract from major issues to maintain confusion and complicity, preventing real democracy from becoming effective. The title of this book borrows a phrase from the writings of Reinhold Niebuhr.

Nearly the entire first half of the book is based on Chomsky's five 1988 Massey Lectures on Canadian Broadcasting Corporation Radio from November 1988 and extends his and Edward S. Herman's propaganda model to a variety of new situations. The remaining appendices address criticisms of the work and provide additional detail.

== See also ==
- John Taylor Gatto: The Underground History of American Education
- Adam Curtis: Century of the Self
