= Dumbing down =

Deliberate oversimplification of intellectual content

Dumbing down is the deliberate oversimplification of intellectual content in education, literature, cinema, news, video games, and culture. Originating in 1933, the term "dumbing down" was movie-business slang, used by screenplay writers, meaning: "[to] revise so as to appeal to those of little education or intelligence". Dumbing-down varies according to subject matter, and usually involves the diminishment of critical thought by undermining standard language and learning standards, thus trivializing academic standards, culture, and meaningful information, as in the case of popular culture.

== Education ==
In the late 20th century, the proportion of young people attending university in the UK increased sharply, including many who previously would not have been considered to possess the appropriate scholastic aptitude. In 2003, the UK Minister for Universities, Margaret Hodge, criticised Mickey Mouse degrees as a negative consequence of universities dumbing down their courses to meet "the needs of the market": these degrees are conferred for studies in a field of endeavour "where the content is perhaps not as [intellectually] rigorous as one would expect, and where the degree, itself, may not have huge relevance in the labour market": thus, a university degree of slight intellectual substance, which the student earned by "simply stacking up numbers on Mickey Mouse courses, is not acceptable".

In Dumbing Us Down: The Hidden Curriculum of Compulsory Schooling (1991, 2002), John Taylor Gatto presented speeches and essays, including "The Psychopathic School", his acceptance speech for the 1990 New York City Teacher of the Year award, and "The Seven-Lesson Schoolteacher", his acceptance speech upon being named as the New York State Teacher of the Year for 1991. Gatto writes that while he was hired to teach English and literature, he came to believe he was employed as part of a social engineering project. The "seven lessons" at the foundation of schooling were never explicitly stated, Gatto writes, but included teaching students that their self-worth depended on outside evaluation, that they were constantly ranked and supervised, and that they had no opportunities for privacy or solitude. Gatto speculated:

Was it possible, I had been hired, not to enlarge children's power, but to diminish it? That seemed crazy, on the face of it, but slowly, I began to realize that the bells and confinement, the crazy sequences, the age-segregation, the lack of privacy, the constant surveillance, and all the rest of the national curriculum of schooling were designed exactly as if someone had set out to prevent children from learning how to think, and act, to coax them into addiction and dependent behavior.

In examining the seven lessons of teaching, Gatto concluded that "all of these lessons are prime training for permanent underclasses, people deprived forever of finding the center of their own special genius". That "school is a twelve-year jail sentence, where bad habits are the only curriculum truly learned. I teach school, and win awards doing it. I should know."

In special education simplification of educational materials is called modification.

== Mass communications media ==
In France, Michel Houellebecq has written (not excluding himself) of "the shocking dumbing-down of French culture and intellect as was recently pointed out, [2008] sternly but fairly, by Time magazine".

== In popular culture ==
The science fiction film Idiocracy (2006) portrays the U.S. as a greatly dumbed-down society 500 years in the future, in which low culture and philistinism were unintentionally achieved by eroding language and education coupled with dysgenics, where people of lower intelligence reproduced faster than the people of higher intelligence. Similar concepts appeared in earlier works, notably the science fiction short story "The Marching Morons" (1951) by Cyril M. Kornbluth, which also features a modern-day protagonist in a future dominated by low-intelligence persons. Moreover, the novel Brave New World (1931) by Aldous Huxley discussed the ways a utopian society was deliberately dumbed down in order to maintain political stability and social order by eliminating complex concepts unnecessary for society to function (e.g., the Savage tries reading Shakespeare to the masses and is not understood). More malevolent uses of dumbing down to preserve the social order are also portrayed in The Matrix, Nineteen Eighty-Four and many dystopian movies.

The social critic Paul Fussell touched on these themes ("prole drift") in his non-fiction book Class: A Guide Through the American Status System (1983) and focused on them specifically in BAD: or, The Dumbing of America (1991).

== See also ==
- Anti-intellectualism – Hostility to and mistrust of education, philosophy, art, literature, and science
- Censorship – Suppression of speech and information
- Dumbing Us Down – Non-fiction book by John Taylor Gatto
- Grade inflation – Awarding higher grades than deserved
- Lie-to-children – Teaching a complex subject via simpler models
- Low culture – Forms of popular culture with mass appeal
- Low information voter
- Manufacturing Consent – 1988 book by Edward S. Herman and Noam Chomsky
- Obscurantism – Practice of obscuring information
- Post-factual politics – Politics in which facts are considered irrelevant
- Prolefeed – Fictional language in the novel "Nineteen Eighty-Four"
- Herd behavior – Behavior of groups without centralized direction
- Sound bite – Short audio clip extracted from a recording
- Stupidity – Lack of intelligence
- Superficiality – Concept in social psychology
- Universal education – Ability of all people to have equal opportunity in education
- Easiness effect – Epistemic overconfidence instilled by pop-sci oversimplifications
- Way Station – 1963 science fiction novel by Clifford D. Simak
