= Ralph Johnson (architect) =

American architect

Ralph Johnson, FAIA is a prominent Chicago-based architect. He is a Principal and Design Director in the Chicago office of Perkins+Will and is also a board member for the firm. Ralph has been with Perkins+Will for 42 years. In the past decade, his projects have been honored with more than 70 design awards, including eight national Honor Awards and more than 50 regional Honor Awards from the American Institute of Architects (AIA). Ralph was twice honored by the Chicago Tribune as a "Chicagoan in the Arts."

Johnson's work has been exhibited at the Art Institute of Chicago, the Paris Biennale, and the São Paulo Biennale. He received the Young Architect Award and was selected to participate in the Emerging Voices Series run by the Architectural League of New York. His work has been published in architectural journals around the world including Architectural Review, Architectural Record, A+U, Architect and Domus. A monograph highlighting his work at Perkins+Will was published in 1995. In addition, he has been a Visiting Critic at the Illinois Institute of Technology and the University of Illinois.

Johnson received his Bachelor of Architecture from the University of Illinois at Urbana-Champaign and his Master of Architecture degree from Harvard University. He began his career at Stanley Tigerman's office and then joined Perkins+Will in 1976. He is a Fellow of the American Institute of Architects.

== Notable projects ==
Chicago

- 235 Van Buren, Chicago, IL
- Boeing International Headquarters, 100 N Riverside Plaza, Chicago, IL
- The Clare at Water Tower, Chicago, IL
- The Contemporaine, Chicago, IL
- William Jones College Preparatory High School, Chicago, IL
- Peggy Notebaert Nature Museum, Chicago, IL
- Perspectives Charter School, Chicago, IL
- Rush University Medical Center - Campus Transformation Projects, Chicago, IL
- Skybridge, Chicago, IL
- O'Hare International Airport Terminal, Chicago, IL

U.S. national

- Arizona State University - Science and Technology Building 1, Tempe, AZ
- Case Western Reserve University, Tinkham Veale University Center, Cleveland, Ohio
- Crate & Barrel Headquarters, Oak Brook, IL
- One Haworth Center, Holland, MI
- Orland Park Village Center Campus, Orland Park, IL
- Perry Community Education Village, Perry, OH
- Signature Place, St. Petersburg, FL
- Spaulding Rehabilitation Hospital, Boston, MA
- University of Illinois at Urbana-Champaign - Tempe Hoyne Buell Hall, Champaign, IL
- The Johns Hopkins Hospital New Clinical Building, Baltimore, MD
- Troy High School, Troy, MI
- U.S. Coast Guard Headquarters, Washington, D.C.

International

- Chervon International Trading Company, Nanjing, China
- Musee de Louvain-la-Neuve, Louvain-la-Neuve, Belgium
- Shanghai Natural History Museum, Shanghai, China
- Tianjin Museum, Tianjin, China
- Universidade Agostinho Neto, Luanda, Angola
