= Philip Will Jr. =

American architect

- Born: February 15, 1906; Rochester, New York, U.S.
- Died: October 23, 1985 (aged 79); Venice, Florida, U.S.
- Occupation: Architect

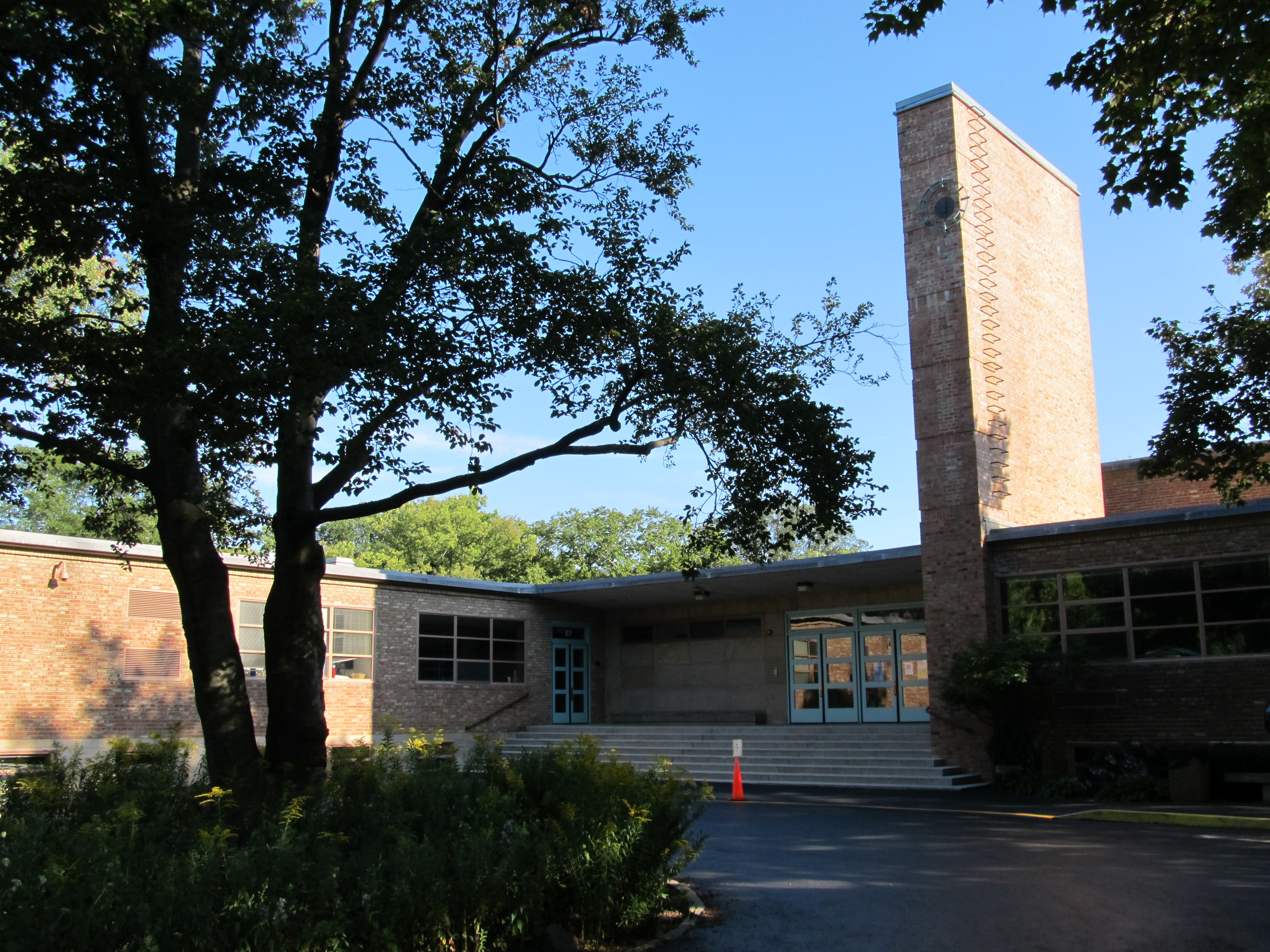
The Crow Island School in Winnetka, Illinois, designed by Perkins, Wheeler & Will and Saarinen & Swanson and completed in 1941.

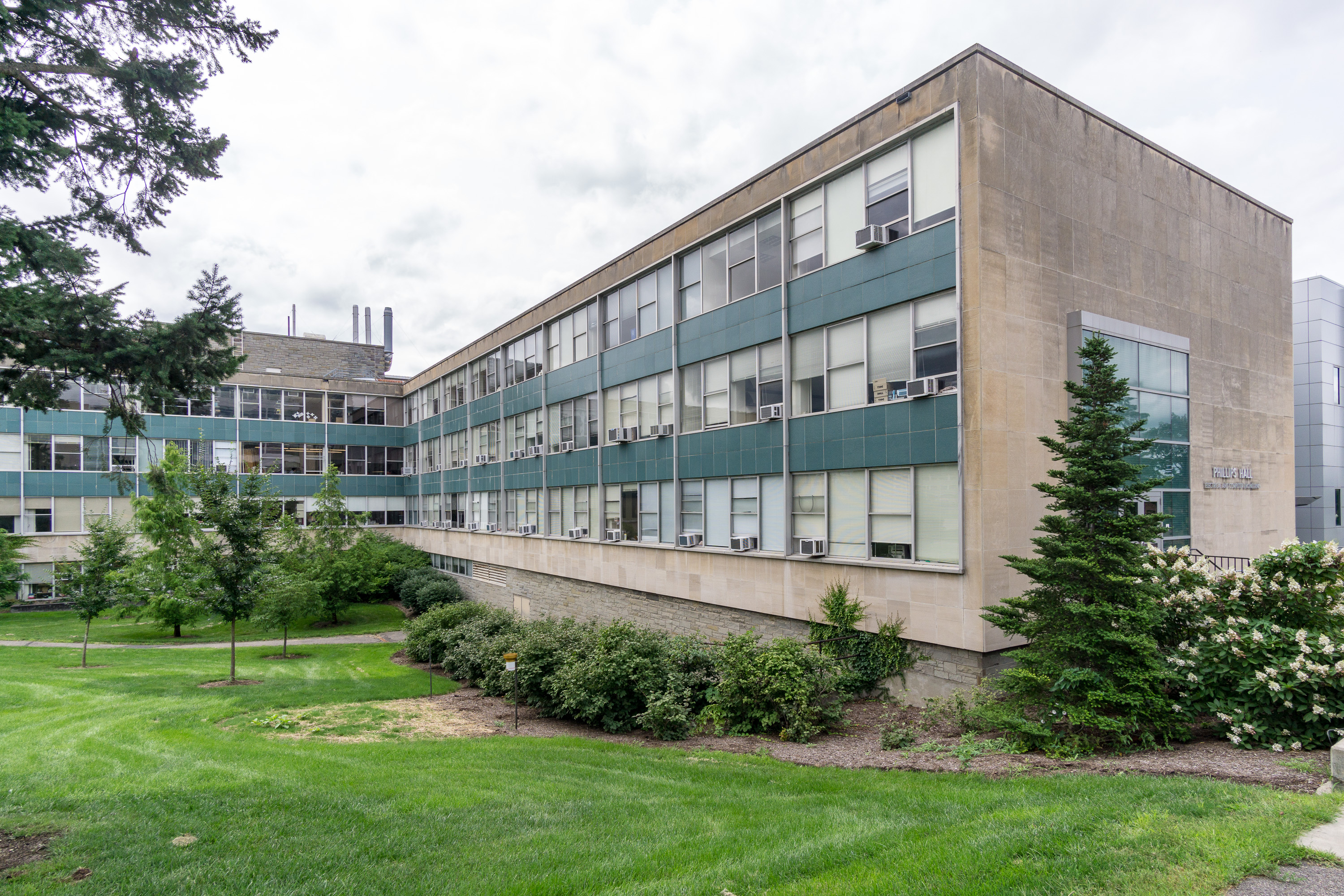
Phillips Hall of Cornell University, designed by Perkins & Will and completed in 1958

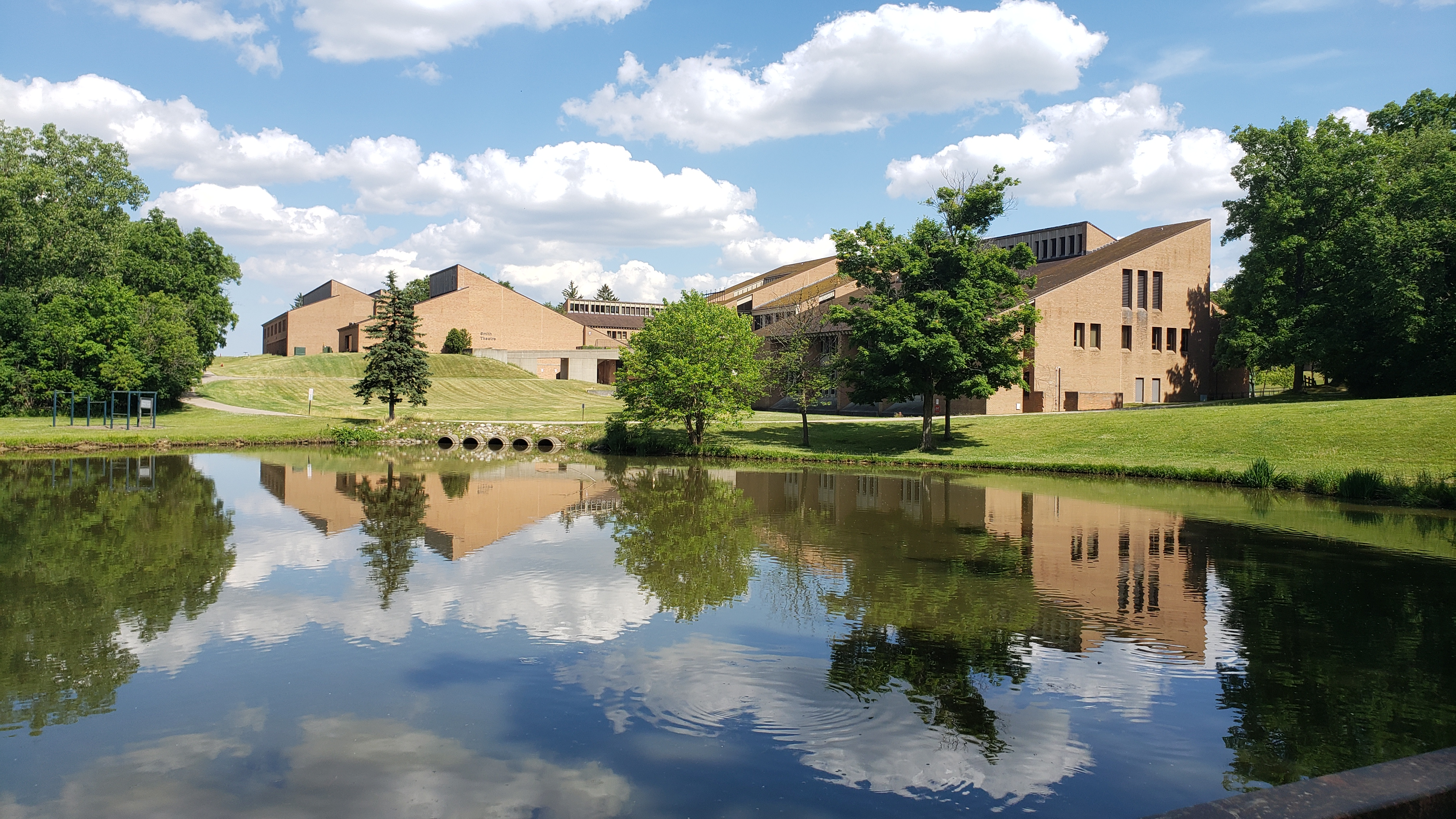
The Orchard Ridge campus of Oakland Community College, completed in 1967

Philip Will Jr. FAIA (1906–1985) was an American architect in practice in Chicago from 1935 to 1980. He was cofounder of the global architectural firm Perkins&Will in 1935 and was president of the American Institute of Architects from 1960 to 1962.

== Life and career ==
Will Jr. was born February 15, 1906, in Rochester, New York. He attended the Rochester public schools, Phillips Exeter Academy and Cornell University, graduating with a B.Arch. in 1930. As recipient of the Shreve, Lamb & Harmon Professional Fellowship, he was a member of the staff of that architectural firm for a year. He stayed on with the firm until 1933, when he moved to Chicago to join General Houses Inc., a designer and manufacturer of prefabricated homes led by architect Howard T. Fisher. In 1935 he left to form the firm of Perkins & Will in partnership with Lawrence Perkins, his former Cornell classmate and the son of architect Dwight H. Perkins. In 1936 the partnership was expanded to include E. Todd Wheeler as Perkins, Wheeler & Will. The firm first gained attention as architects of the Crow Island School in Winnetka, Illinois, completed in 1941. Will and the firm would develop school design as one of their specialties. In 1946 Wheeler left the partnership, and the firm was again known as Perkins & Will.

Originally a regional practice, the firm had developed a national reputation by the early 1950s. With the addition of other principals in the firm to handle its many projects, Will took the lead on many of the largest, including the new headquarters of the United States Gypsum Company, completed in 1963. He retired from the firm in 1980.

Will joined the American Institute of Architects in 1940 as a member of the Chicago chapter, and was elected a Fellow in 1951. He served as chapter president from 1952 to 1954. He was then national second and first vice president before being elected president in 1960, succeeding John N. Richards. He was reelected in 1961. During his presidency the AIA inaugurated the Architecture Firm Award, with Skidmore, Owings & Merrill as the first recipient. He was succeeded by Henry L. Wright in 1962.

== Personal life ==
Will was married in 1933 to Caroline Elizabeth Sinclair, and they had two children. In 1937 he completed a home for himself in Evanston, where he and his wife lived until their retirement to Venice, Florida. Will died there October 23, 1985, at the age of 79.

== Architectural works ==
Perkins & Will developed as a large practice, and has been responsible for many thousands of buildings. Some which Will was particularly involved in include:

- Philip Will Jr. house, 2949 Harrison St, Evanston, Illinois (1937)
- Crow Island School, (Note: Designed in association with Eliel Saarinen and J. Robert F. Swanson of Saarinen & Swanson.) 1112 Willow Rd, Winnetka, Illinois (1940–41, NRHP and NHL 1990)
- Blythe Park Elementary School, 735 Leesley Rd, Riverside, Illinois (1948–49)
- Bedford Park Community Building, 6652 S 78th Ave, Bedford Park, Illinois (1951–52)
- Heathcote School, 26 Palmer Ave, Scarsdale, New York (1953)
- Keokuk High School, 2285 Middle Rd, Keokuk, Iowa (1953)
- Rockford Memorial Hospital, (Note: Designed in association with Hubbard & Hyland.) 2400 N Rockton Ave, Rockford, Illinois (1954)
- Lutheran Brotherhood Building, 701 2nd Ave S, Minneapolis, Minnesota (1955–56, demolished)
- Engineering campus, Cornell University, Ithaca, New York (1958)
- International Minerals and Chemical Corporation office building, 5401 Old Orchard Rd, Skokie, Illinois (1958)
- Pure Oil Company office building, (Note: Now the Schaumburg campus of Roosevelt University.) 1400 N Roosevelt Blvd, Schaumburg, Illinois (1960)
- Stamford Hospital, 1 Hospital Plz, Stamford, Connecticut (1960)
- United States Gympsum Company Building, 101 S Wacker Dr, Chicago, Illinois (1962–63, demolished 1994)
- National Center for Agricultural Education, Chapingo Autonomous University, Texcoco de Mora, Mexico (1964)
- Lutheran School of Theology, 1100 E 55th St, Chicago, Illinois (1965)
- Salsbury Laboratories, 2000 Rockford Rd, Charles City, Iowa (1966)
- Oakland Community College Orchard Ridge campus, 27055 Orchard Lake Rd, Farmington Hills, Michigan (1967)
- Scott, Foresman & Company office building, 1900 E Lake Ave, Glenview, Illinois (1967)
- Chase Tower, (Note: Designed in association with C.F. Murphy Associates.) 10 S Dearborn St, Chicago, Illinois (1969)
- Abbott Laboratories, 100 Abbott Park Rd, Green Oaks, Illinois (1969)
