= Carleton Washburne =

American educator and education reformer

Carleton Wolsey Washburne
- Born: December 2, 1889; Chicago, Illinois
- Died: November 27, 1968 (aged 78); Okemos, Michigan
- Occupation: Educator

Carleton Wolsey Washburne (December 2, 1889 – November 28, 1968) was an American educator and education reformer. He served as the superintendent of schools in Winnetka, Illinois, from 1919 to 1943 and is most notably associated with the Winnetka Plan that he developed for his district.

== Early life and education ==
Carleton Wolsey Washburne was born in Chicago, Illinois, in 1889 to an obstetrician father. His mother was active in political affairs, especially education, and was a friend of the innovative educator John Dewey. The family was well-educated, though not particularly wealthy. Washburne was raised Protestant and attended the Francis W. Parker School. Late in his childhood, his family moved to Elkhart, Indiana, where Washburne attended a traditional school. During his high school years, Washburne moved back to Chicago to live with his maternal grandfather and study at John Marshall Metropolitan High School. When his immediate family moved to Elgin, Illinois, Washburne followed and finished his high school education there. He initially followed in the family footsteps and studied medicine at the University of Chicago. However, he found little interest in the material and transferred to Stanford University in California, graduating in 1912. Washburne married Heluiz Bigelow Chandler in the same year.

== Career ==
Washburne originally set out on a business venture, but was unsuccessful. Unable to otherwise support his family, he took a position as a teacher in low-income La Puente, California. Seeing the shortcomings of then-prevalent style of instruction, he combined the ideas of Dewey with his experiences at the Francis W. Parker school to create a progressive education curriculum. His work caught the attention of Frederic Lister Burk, the president of the San Francisco State Teachers College, who hired him to teach at the institution's affiliated elementary school. Washburne taught there for five years, serving as head of the science department. While there, he conducted research on preadolescence and studied at the University of California, Berkeley, becoming one of the first recipients of a doctorate in education.

Burk heard of an opening for a superintendent for Winnetka School District 36 in Winnetka, Illinois, and recommended Washburne for the job. Washburne oversaw Winnetka schools from 1919 to 1943. The district only had elementary schools, so Washburne was able to focus on that age group. It was here that he developed the Winnetka Plan, a system of individualized instruction in an ungraded setting. The Winnetka Plan, based on the principles of progressive education, aimed to develop the "whole child" and included physical, emotional, social, and intellectual education. The curriculum included both "common essentials" (reading, writing, number skills, history, and geography) and "creative group activities" such as art, music, literature, and physical education. Washburne collaborated with Francis W. Parker and the North Shore Country Day School to share faculty and curricula. Among his other innovations in Winnetka, he instituted guidance programs in elementary schools, created middle schools, and promoted early childhood education. He served as chairman of the Winnetka Summer School for Teachers and the Winnetka Graduate Teachers College.

Starting in 1928 Washburne led a study, in collaboration with University of Chicago graduate student Mabel Morphett, that attempted to determine the age when a child could reasonably be expected to learn to read. Examining first-grade students in Winnetka schools, they found that children with a mental age of 6.5 years could read successfully. Their findings were published in an education journal in 1931. The study was influential in advancing among American educators the concept that the child's "reading readiness" was a critically important factor in the successful teaching of reading. More recent research has suggested that the quality of the instruction a child receives is more important than mental age in determining learning success.

Washburne was one of the founding members of the John Dewey Society in 1935. He served as president of the Progressive Education Association and of the New Education Fellowship. He oversaw the design and completion of the Crow Island School in 1940, which was heralded for its teaching concepts and unique architecture, and is now a National Historic Landmark.

Washburne resigned from the Winnetka School District in 1943 to help the U.S. Army reopen educational facilities in occupied Italy during World War II. He was the head of the Allied Forces subcommission which revisited the high school scholastic curriculum defined in 1935 by the Italian fascist Minister of Education De Vecchi. In the didactic of philosophy Washburne abolished from the scholastic curriculum of the liceo classico any reference to the fascist ideology and particularly to the Dottrina del Fascismo (Doctrine of Fascism) published by De Vecchi, but for instance, the Italian teaching of philosophy kept references to the thought of Giovanni Gentile for all the 1950s.

Washburne remained there until 1949, playing an important role in reorganizing the Italian public school system. He then accepted an offer to become the director of teacher education at Brooklyn College. In 1961, he joined the Michigan State University College of Education as a distinguished professor, where he taught for the rest of his life.

== Recognition ==
- Carleton W. Washburne Middle School in Winnetka is named after him.

== Bibliography ==
Washburne published many works over his career, including arithmetic lesson pamphlets and book lists. He also published several books:

- The Story of the Earth, 1916 (with Heluiz Chandler Washburne)
- Common Science, 1920
- Progressive Tendencies in European Education, 1923
- Results of Practical Experiments in Fitting Schools to Individualize, 1926
- Better Schools: A Survey of Progressive Education, 1928
- The Public Schools and the Preschool Child, 1929
- Adjusting the School to the Child: Practical First Steps, 1932
- The Story of Earth and Sky, 1933
- A Living Philosophy of Education, 1940
- What Is Progressive Education?: A Book for Parents and Others, 1952
- Schools Aren't what They Were: A Book for Parents and Others, 1953
- The World's Good: Education for World-Mindedness, 1954. The John Day Company. ASIN B0097747T2
- Winnetka: The History and Significance of an Educational Experiment, 1963 (with Sidney P. Marland, Jr.)
- Samuel Boussian, Mathias Gardet, Martine Ruchat : L'Internationale des républiques d'enfants, 2020, éd. Anamorasa, ISBN 9791095772958
