= Frederic Lister Burk =

Canadian-born American educator (1862–1924)

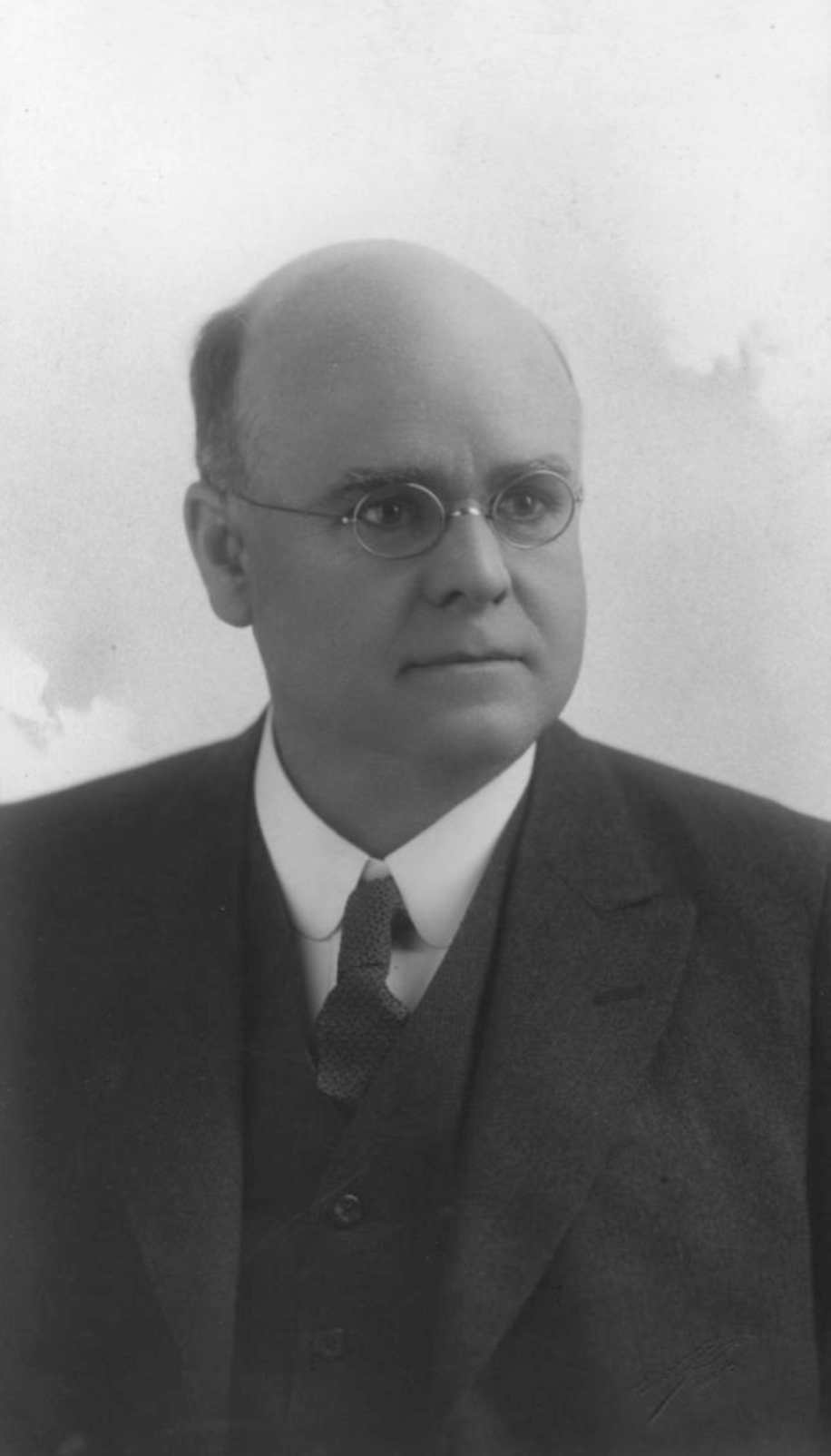
- Burk in 1899

1st President of San Francisco State University
- In office 1899–1924
- Succeeded by: Archibald B. Anderson

Personal details
- Born: September 1, 1862 Blenheim, Canada West
- Died: June 12, 1924 (aged 61) Oakland, Alameda County, California, U.S.
- Resting place: Mountain View Cemetery (Oakland, California)
- Spouse: Caroline Foster Frear
- Children: 4, including Dean Burk
- Education: University of California, Berkeley, Stanford University, Clark University,
- Occupation: Educator, educational theorist, educational superintendent and reformer, university president, journalist

Frederic Lister Burk (September 1, 1862 – June 12, 1924) was a Canadian-born American educator, educational theorist, superintendent, educational reformer, university president, and journalist. He served as the founding President of San Francisco State University (formerly San Francisco State Normal School). He lived for many years in Kentfield, Marin County, California.

== Early life and education ==
Burk was born September 1, 1862, in Blenheim, Canada West. His parents were Matilda Turner (1822–1905), his English mother; and Erastus Burk (1816–1897), his American father. At the age of 7 his family moved to the town of Coloma in El Dorado County, California. He graduated from Sacramento City High School.

Burk attended the University of California, Berkeley and received a B.L. degree in 1883; followed by studies at Stanford University and received a M.A. degree in 1892; and Clark University where he studied under G. Stanley Hall and received a Ph.D. degree in 1898. On September 30, 1898, Burk married Caroline Foster Frear, together they had 4 sons.

== Career ==
From 1883 to 1889, Burk worked at the newspapers in San Francisco as a journalist. After graduation from his Ph.D. program, Burk started his teaching career in public school and private schools. From 1892 until 1896, he served as the superintendent of public schools in Santa Rosa. From 1897 until 1899, he served as superintendent of public schools in Santa Barbara.

In March 1899, Burk served as the first president of San Francisco State University (formerly San Francisco State Normal School), a position he held until his death.

Burk developed an original system of individual learning based on teaching aids, like self-correction and self-drill. Burk's educational system had influence on the practice of teaching in the United States, including the development of the Dalton Plan by Helen Parkhurst, and on the activities of Carleton Washburne to create the Winnetka Plan. However his pedagogy was criticized by noted educators William T. Harris and Francis Parker.

Burk was a member of the California State Board of Education and the California Teachers Association.

He died on June 12, 1924, in Oakland, California, during a surgical procedure and is buried in Mountain View Cemetery in Oakland.

== Publications ==
- Burk, Frederic Lister (1904). The Teaching of Grammar: Prepared for the Use of Student-Teachers of Grammar in the San Francisco State Normal Training Schools. Sacramento, California: W. W. Shannnon.
- Johnston, Corinne H.; Burk, Frederic Lister (1912). Course of Study in Phonics. Vol. 16. San Francisco Normal School. Sacramento, California: F. W. Richardson.
- Burk, Frederic Lister (1913). Lock-Step Schooling and a Remedy; the Fundamental Evils and Handicaps of Class Instruction; and a Report of Progress in the Construction of an Individual System. Sacramento, California: F. W. Richardson.
- Burk, Frederic Lister (1920). A Study of the Kindergarten Problem in the Public Kindergartens of Santa Barbara, California, 1898–1899. New York City, New York: Teachers College, Columbia University.
