= SoLo House =

General information
- Status: Completed
- Type: Residential
- Location: Soo Valley, British Columbia, Squamish-Lillooet C, Canada
- Completed: 2020
- Client: Delta Land Development

Technical details
- Floor area: 4,090 sq ft (380 m^{2})

Design and construction
- Architect: Perkins and Will
- Developer: Delta Land Development
- Structural engineer: Glotman Simpson, Glotman Simpson Consulting Engineers

Website
- https://perkinswill.com/project/solo/

The SoLo House is an atypical alpine home designed by architecture firm Perkins and Will for Delta Land Development, a Vancouver-based real estate firm. The 4090 square foot (380 m^{2}) complex is situated on an isolated forested knoll overlooking the Soo Valley on the coast of British Columbia. The main house contains an open living and kitchen space, dining area, bathroom, and master bedroom on the main floor and two additional bedrooms and bathrooms on the loft level. The auxiliary building houses the battery system and hydrogen fuel cell is placed just to the south of the main house.

Perkins and Will expressed that the SoLo House was created as a prototype intended to inform larger projects. It acts as an example of a future way to build for the environment while still maintaining function and aesthetic. Its design demonstrates a sustainable approach to living off-the-grid in a remote environment as it operates without any need for fossil fuels. Low-energy systems, healthy materials, and prefabricated and modular construction methods were implemented to accomplish this efficient and sustainable design.

== History ==
The SoLo House is built between the traditional territories of the Lil’wat and Squamish First Nations. Development in the region began in the 1970s with secluded settlements to accommodate avid cross-country skiers, naturalists, and outdoor adventurers who actively used the land. Today the popular skiing and hiking area has withstood the effects of disturbance and has regrown into a second-growth forest.

To contribute and support the local economy, the design team stated that all timber that was cleared on the site in Soo Valley to accommodate for the SoLo House build was given back into the local forest industry. In order to minimize further disturbance and damage to the site, the prefabricated home was designed with a light structure that sits about 3 meters above the terrain on stilts, allowing nature and the site to exist beneath it and remain the focus.

== Sustainability ==
Perkins and Will sensitively designed the SoLo house by eliminating the production of fossil fuels from its construction and its operation. This case-study was used as an opportunity to test ways and means to reach net-zero in building emissions while situated off-the-grid, nearly 15 kilometers (9 miles) away from the nearest city. To accomplish this, specific materials, systems, and construction methods were chosen and implemented. The house has received a Passive House Institute Low Energy Building Certification. The final result is a house that demonstrates self-sufficiency by generating more energy on site than it uses, meaning it is beyond a net-zero energy building.

=== Materials ===
Mass timber was chosen as the primary building material and is expressed through the structural and the finishing elements. The building envelope includes 2 layers - the most exterior, a timber frame structure, acting as a shield to weather conditions, and the interior, a heavily insulated layer, to ensure thermal comfort. High performance triple-pane glazing is used to maximize views outside and promote daylighting, while allowing solar gain in the winter and eliminating it in the summer. The interior of the house features only six materials, with Douglas Fir lumber implemented throughout as beams and columns. The use of lumber elements contributes to sequestering carbon dioxide from the atmosphere. With the firm's commitment to promote and maintain the health and well-being of the site and the building occupants, they chose materials to contribute to the holistic design approach and eliminated harmful substances. On the southern side of the structure, there are a series of large triple-glazed windows that heat the indoors and maximize the solar gain.

=== Systems ===
As an off-the-grid home, placed in a remote location far from civilization, several systems were required for the house to function effectively independently. Perkins and Will incorporated a 30-kilowatt photovoltaic array (PV array), that spans more than 30 meters (49 feet), as the primary source of producing renewable energy on site. The PV array converts sunlight into electricity that can be used to power the home. If the power in the house was to go out completely there is a hydrogen fuel cell implemented as a backup source. Geothermal heating is used to draw heat into the house from a ground-source pump in the earth. In addition, the house collects and filters its own drinking water from a well dug on the property.

=== Construction Method ===
Due to the site’s remote location, uneven terrain, and harsh climate, Perkins and Will commissioned a local fabricator to construct the SoLo House beginning off-site in modular building elements and then shipped the components to the site. This allowed for the building to be quickly installed in the summer and decreased the amount of equipment that needed to be delivered to the remote site which heavily contributed to reducing the project’s carbon footprint.

== Awards ==
- Special Jury Award - AFBC Architectural Awards of Excellence, 2021
- Award of Merit - IES Illumination Awards, 2021
- Special Recognition—, Single-Family Home - Passive House Institute International Awards, 2021
- AZ Awards, Award of Merit and People’s Choice— Architecture: Single-Family Houses - Azure Magazine, 2021
- AZ Awards, Award of Merit—Environmental Leadership - Azure Magazine, 2021
- Residential Wood Design Award - BC Wood Design Awards, 2021
- Georgie Awards: Best Certified Home—Custom category and Best Environmental Initiative - Canadian Home Builders’ Association of British Columbia, 2021
- Award of Merit - Wood Design & Building Award, 2020
- Award - Canadian Wood Council, 2020
