= Dean Burk =

American biochemist and medical researcher (1904–1988)

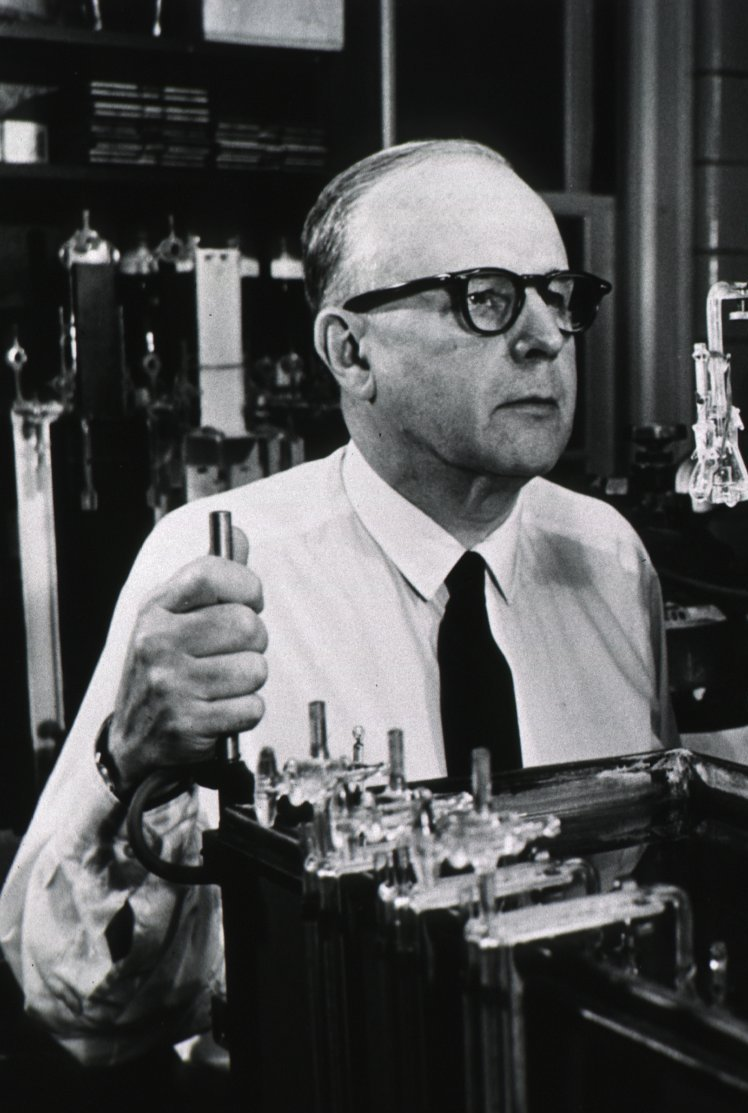
- Born: Dean Turner Burk; March 21, 1904; Oakland, California, U.S.
- Died: October 6, 1988 (aged 84); Washington, D.C., U.S.
- Other name: M. Dean Burk
- Education: University of California, Davis; University of California, Berkeley
- Spouse: Mildred Chaundy Burk
- Father: Frederic Lister Burk

Dean Turner Burk (March 21, 1904 – October 6, 1988) was an American biochemist, medical researcher, and a cancer researcher at the Kaiser Wilhelm Institute and the National Cancer Institute. In 1934, he developed the Lineweaver–Burk plot together with Hans Lineweaver. Lineweaver and Burk collaborated with the eminent statistician W. Edwards Deming on the statistical analysis of their data: they used the plot for illustration, not for the analysis.

== Early life ==
Dean Turner Burk was born on March 21, 1904, in Oakland in Alameda County. Dean was the second of four sons born to Frederic Lister Burk, the founding President of the San Francisco Normal School, a preparatory school for teachers which eventually became San Francisco State University.

He entered the University of California, Davis at the age of 15. A year later, he transferred to the University of California, Berkeley, where he received his B.S. degree in Entomology in 1923. Four years later, he earned a Ph.D. in biochemistry.

== Professional career ==
Burk joined the Department of Agriculture in 1929 working in the Fixed Nitrogen Research Laboratory. In 1939, he joined the Cancer Institute as a senior chemist. He was head of the cytochemistry laboratory when he retired in 1974. He also taught biochemistry at the Cornell University Medical School from 1939 to 1941. He was a research master at George Washington University. Burk was a close friend and co-author with Otto Heinrich Warburg. He was a co-developer of the prototype of the Magnetic Resonance Scanner. Burk published more than 250 scientific articles in his lifetime. He later became head of the National Cancer Institute's Cytochemistry Sector in 1938, although he is often mistaken as leading the entire facility.

== Retirement ==
After retiring from the NCI in 1974, Dean Burk remained active. He devoted himself to his opposition to water fluoridation. He and a coauthor published an analysis of cancer mortality in 10 cities that fluoridated the drinking water supply and 10 that didn't. The paper was criticized for using overly broad grouping and making assumptions about variations in racial composition of cities. Epidemiologists from the National Cancer Institute analyzed the findings and found no significant increase in cancer mortality associated with fluoridation. Burk considered "fluoridation as "mass murder on a grand scale." Dean Burk argued on Dutch television against a water fluoridation proposal which was before the Dutch Parliament in the Netherlands. He also was an avid supporter of laetrile; an alleged cancer treatment regarded by the medical community as ineffective and potentially dangerous.

== Recognition ==
For his work on photosynthesis, Dean Burk received the Hillebrand Prize in 1952. Dean Burk and Otto Heinrich Warburg discovered the photosynthesis I-quantum reaction that splits CO_{2} activated by respiration. For his techniques to distinguish between normal cells and those damaged by cancer, Dean Burk was awarded the Gerhard Domagk Prize in 1965.
