= 235 Van Buren =

Condominium building in Chicago, Illinois

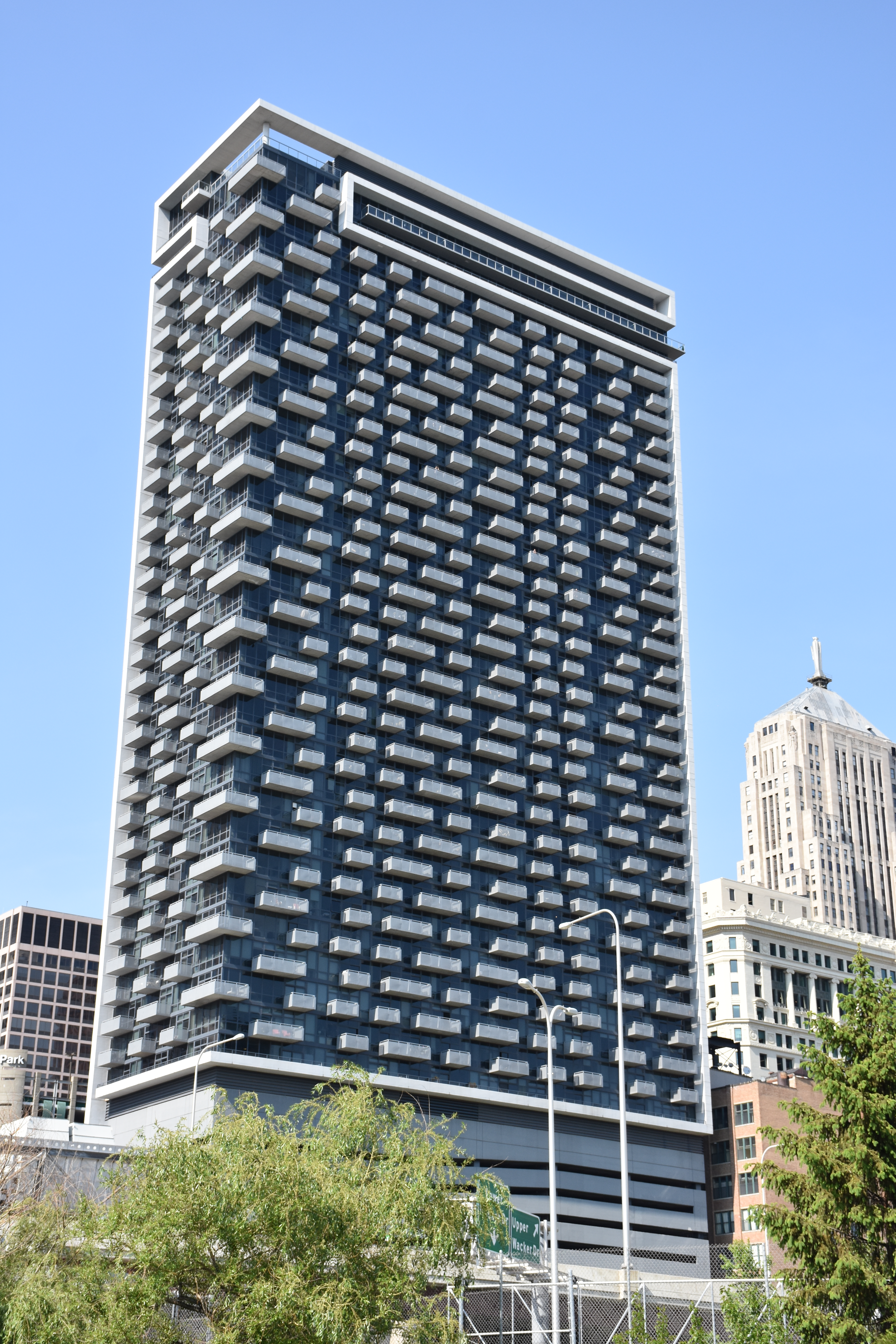

General information
- Status: Completed
- Type: Residential
- Location: Chicago, Illinois
- Coordinates: 41.8765°N 87.6348°W
- Construction started: 2007
- Completed: 2010

Height
- Roof: 490 ft.

Technical details
- Floor count: 46

Design and construction
- Architect: Perkins&Will
- Developer: CMK

235 Van Buren is a high-rise condominium building located in Chicago's Loop neighborhood near the Willis Tower and the 311 South Wacker Drive Building. The 46 story skyscraper was designed by Perkins&Will and built by CMK Companies, a Chicago-based real estate development company. As the building's name suggests, it is located at 235 West Van Buren Street adjacent to the Chicago River at the eastern terminus of Eisenhower Expressway.

Completed in January 2010, it is a residential building with 714 condominium units, an 11-story, 570-spot parking garage, as well as approximately 10,000 sq. ft. of retail space located on the building's first two floors. The building is currently home to the South Loop Market, Van Buren Gentlemen's Salon, and the 235 Van Buren On-Site Sales Center.

Each residence has modern interiors with floor-to-ceiling windows, 10 foot ceilings, and exposed concrete accents. The building has 1 to 3 bedroom condos. It also has a penthouse on the top floor which was featured on an episode of HGTV's House Hunters TV show.

== Awards ==
The building has earned honors for the unusual modern design, including:

- Distinguished Building Award, Citation of Merit – American Institute of Architects, Chicago Chapter
- Mies van der Rohe Award, Special Recognition – American Institute of Architects Illinois
- Louis Sullivan Award, Top Honor – American Institute of Architects Illinois.

== See also ==
- List of tallest buildings in Chicago
- List of tallest buildings in the United States
