= Winnetka School District 36 =

School district in Illinois, United States

Winnetka Public Schools

Location
- 1235 Oak St. Winnetka, Cook County, Illinois 60093 United States

District information
- Type: Elementary school district
- Grades: Kindergarten-Grade 8
- Established: 1859 (first school)
- Superintendent: Kelly Tess

Students and staff
- Students: 1676 (2022-2023)

Other information
- Website: www.winnetka36.org

Winnetka School District 36 is an elementary school district based in Winnetka, Cook County, Illinois, a suburb of Chicago that is due north of the city. The district is composed of five schools: three neighborhood elementary schools, and two middle schools. All schools are located within Winnetka boundaries.

== District schools ==
Students in the district may begin their education as prekindergarteners in Samuel Sewell Greeley Elementary School or as kindergarteners at either Crow Island Elementary School or Hubbard Woods Elementary School All schools educate students from grades one through four; after elementary school, students move on to Skokie Middle School, which houses the fifth and sixth grade. The last school that students in Winnetka District 36 attend is Carleton W. Washburne Middle School, which covers grades seven and eight; Washburne and the Skokie School are located on the same campus.

== History ==
The district's first school was founded in 1859, a decade before the village of Winnetka was incorporated. The first Winnetka Board of Education was formed in 1892 when Winnetka had two schools. At that time, the Board endorsed a program of study being taught in the Chicago public schools, but questions arose about the effectiveness of traditional education methods. In 1919, the District hired Carleton Washburne as Superintendent. Washburne was a product of a Chicago elementary school founded by Francis Parker, who together with John Dewey were early practitioners of progressive education. Winnetka's education program was transformed during Washburne's 24-year tenure and came to be known as the Winnetka Plan. Driving the development of progressive education through research and publication, Washburne's academic program ultimately included (among other things): individualized learning geared to the readiness of each child, interdisciplinary learning, creative project work and jettisoning of grades in favor of individual student goals.

The five buildings comprising the Winnetka Public Schools were constructed during the 19th and 20th centuries. Of note is Crow Island School opened in 1940 and designed by Chicago architects Perkins, Wheeler and Will in collaboration with the father and son team of Eero Saarinen and Eliel Saarinen. The innovative architecture of Crow Island served as a model for many US schools built after World War II. The school has been the recipient of many design awards and was named a National Historic Landmark in 1990.

== Philosophy and academics ==
Winnetka School District practices are aligned with progressive education philosophy, many aspects of which are now included in the more recent 21st Century Skills educational movement. Developed with community and staff input, the District's vision document: Winnetka:A Community of Learners forms the basis for its educational goals and delineates the District's commitment to developing the "whole child" and to the mastery of academic skills.

Instructional strategies are based on the premise that learning is most effective when instruction is differentiated to meet the individual needs of each child and when children are challenged by genuine problems associated with their interests. District curriculum utilizes both integrated units of study (encompassing multiple subjects) and experiential education to foster higher-order thinking, creativity and practical application.

The Winnetka Public Schools are affiliated with the Progressive Education Network(PEN) at both the national and regional levels. The District is a member of the Coalition of Essential Schools and a founding member of the Winnetka Alliance for Early Childhood. Committed to lifelong learning for all its learners, the District has long sponsored educational sessions for its teachers through the Winnetka Teachers Institute and for the broader community through the Winnetka Parents Institute.

== Financial health ==
Winnetka residents are tremendously supportive of their schools as demonstrated by the passing of all educational operating and capital referendums since 1895.

In 1995, the Illinois legislature instituted “tax caps” for Cook County which limits the annual growth of property taxes (and thus the revenue to taxing bodies such as school districts) to the rate of inflation as measured by the Consumer Price Index (CPI) or 5%; whichever is less. Additional revenue requests require voter approval. Since 1995, Winnetka residents have approved five capital and operating referendums.

Winnetka Public Schools District 36 has received a Certificate of Financial Recognition from the Illinois State Board of Education and has maintained a AAA bond rating since 2008, one of only 20 elementary districts in Illinois.

== Building renewal ==
In 2007, 61% of Winnetka voters approved a $47.3 million capital referendum (the largest in Winnetka history) for the repair and restoration of all five school buildings as well as the expansion of two schools. Washburne School now includes state-of-the-art science labs, music rooms and gymnasiums, with all schools benefitting from the installation of wi-fi and other technological supports.

In 2017-2018, District 36 began a process to create an Educational Facility Master Plan. Once finalized, this plan will be the blueprint for how the district will align its educational philosophy, facilities, and projected enrollment to meet the community's current and future needs.

== Community support ==
The Winnetka Public Schools Foundation (WPSF) was formed in 1995 as a not-for-profit fundraising organization whose purpose is to extend the educational mission of the Winnetka Public Schools beyond the means of conventional public funding. Since its inception, the Foundation has provided over $4.2 million in support to the District. WPSF grants help to fund teacher research and development, artists-in-residence, technology, equipment and other special programs.

Winnetka School Board members are nominated by the Winnetka Caucus Council and serve up to two four-year terms after being approved in a general election. The Caucus system is a form of self-government instituted in the Village of Winnetka in 1915 that gathers information from annual resident surveys and nominates qualified candidates to serve on Village governmental bodies.

== Transition to High school ==
Students who complete the eighth grade in Winnetka School District 36 and live in New Trier Township High School District 203 are eligible for New Trier High School. District 36 serves kindergarten to eighth grade and New Trier serves nineth to twelfth grade. New Trier also draws students from other public schools in the surrounding North Shore communities.

New Trier High School has two campuses, one in Northfield and another in Winnetka. Students go to the Northfield campus to start their high school journey, then go to the Winnetka campus after their freshman year for their sophomore, junior and senior year. Before New Trier opened, students had to travel outside the North Shore to continue their education after elementary school. As the school system continued to develop, Carleton Washburne Junior High School opened in 1969 for seventh- and eighth-grade students.
