= Winnetka Plan =

The Winnetka Plan was an educational experiment held in the Winnetka, Illinois-based Winnetka School District 36. Developed by Carleton Washburne, who was the district superintendent (1919-1943), and inspired by John Dewey's work in the University of Chicago Laboratory School, the plan attempted to expand educational focus to creative activities and emotional and social development, using a program of a type that later became known as "programmed instruction."

The curriculum divided subjects into "common essentials" and "creative group activities." While "common essentials" required students to demonstrate mastery to advance, the creative activities allowed students to advance at different rates and there were no strict goals or standards of achievement. Rather than putting "gifted" students into higher-level classes, the students struggling with schoolwork were put into special classes to address those individual problems. Most of the time, the struggling student received one-on-one help from a teacher. To this day, these classes and teaching sessions still exist, sometimes called "Study Skills" or "Resources."

The plan was widely imitated and led to shifts in curriculum focus across the United States.
