= Perkins&Will =

American architectural firm

- Type: Private
- Industry: Architecture
- Founded: 1935; 91 years ago
- Founder: Lawrence Perkins; Philip Will Jr.
- Headquarters: Chicago, Illinois, U.S.
- Number of employees: 2,600
- Website: perkinswill.com

Perkins&Will is an American global design practice founded in 1935. Since 1986, the group has been a subsidiary of Lebanon-based Sidara.

== History ==
The firm was established in Chicago by Lawrence Perkins (1907–1998) and Philip Will Jr. (1906–1985). Perkins and Will met while studying architecture at Cornell University.

Perkins&Will attracted national attention in 1940 with the Crow Island School in Winnetka, Illinois, designed in association with Eliel Saarinen and Eero Saarinen. In 1971, the American Institute of Architects named Crow Island School as the recipient of its Twenty-five Year Award, which annually recognizes "a building that has set a precedent for the last 25 to 35 years and continues to set standards of excellence for its architectural design and significance."

In 1986, Dar Al-Handasah (Arabic: دار الهندسة), a multidisciplinary engineering consultancy, purchased Perkins&Will. Together with global engineering, management, planning, and energy firms TYLin, Currie & Brown, Introba, Landrum & Brown, and Penspen, Perkins&Will and Dar now form the Dar Group, which is registered in Dubai.

Starting in 2000, Perkins&Will began to acquire other firms in the U.S. and abroad. In August 2004, they merged with the Vancouver practice of architect Peter Busby. In March 2014, Perkins&Will announced its planned acquisition of The Freelon Group, led by the late Philip Freelon. Freelon joined Perkins and Will's board of directors and became managing and design director of the firm's North Carolina practice. In 2015, 2016, and 2017, respectively, they acquired London-based consultancy Portland Design Associates, U.S. transportation planning firm Nelson\Nygaard. and architecture firm Sink Combs Dethlefs.

In February 2018, Perkins&Will acquired Danish practice Schmidt Hammer Lassen Architects. Known for their work in the cultural sector, Schmidt Hammer Lassen Architects were founded in 1986 with offices in Copenhagen and Shanghai. In 2018, they acquired Dallas-based interiors firm Lauckgroup, followed by San Francisco-based Pfau Long Architecture and the London-based firm Penoyre & Prasad in 2019. In July 2022, Perkins&Will acquired the Bainbridge Island, Washington, practice of architect Jason F. McLennan. McLennan became Perkins&Will's chief sustainability officer.

== Sustainable design ==
The firm's website claims to have more Leadership in Energy and Environmental Design (LEED) accredited professionals than any other design firm in North America. In 2011, they announced the LEED-ND (Neighborhood Development) platinum level certification for their 100th sustainable building, the Dockside Green Phase Two Balance project, located in Victoria, British Columbia.

Notable LEED projects:

- University at Buffalo's School of Engineering and Applied Sciences
- Rush University Medical Center, Orthopedic Ambulatory Building – Largest LEED CS Gold healthcare building in the country.
- The Charles E. Young Research Library at UCLA achieved LEED Gold certification
- SoMa Site 3 Lab Building, Cambridge, LEED Gold

== Notable buildings ==
Selected projects

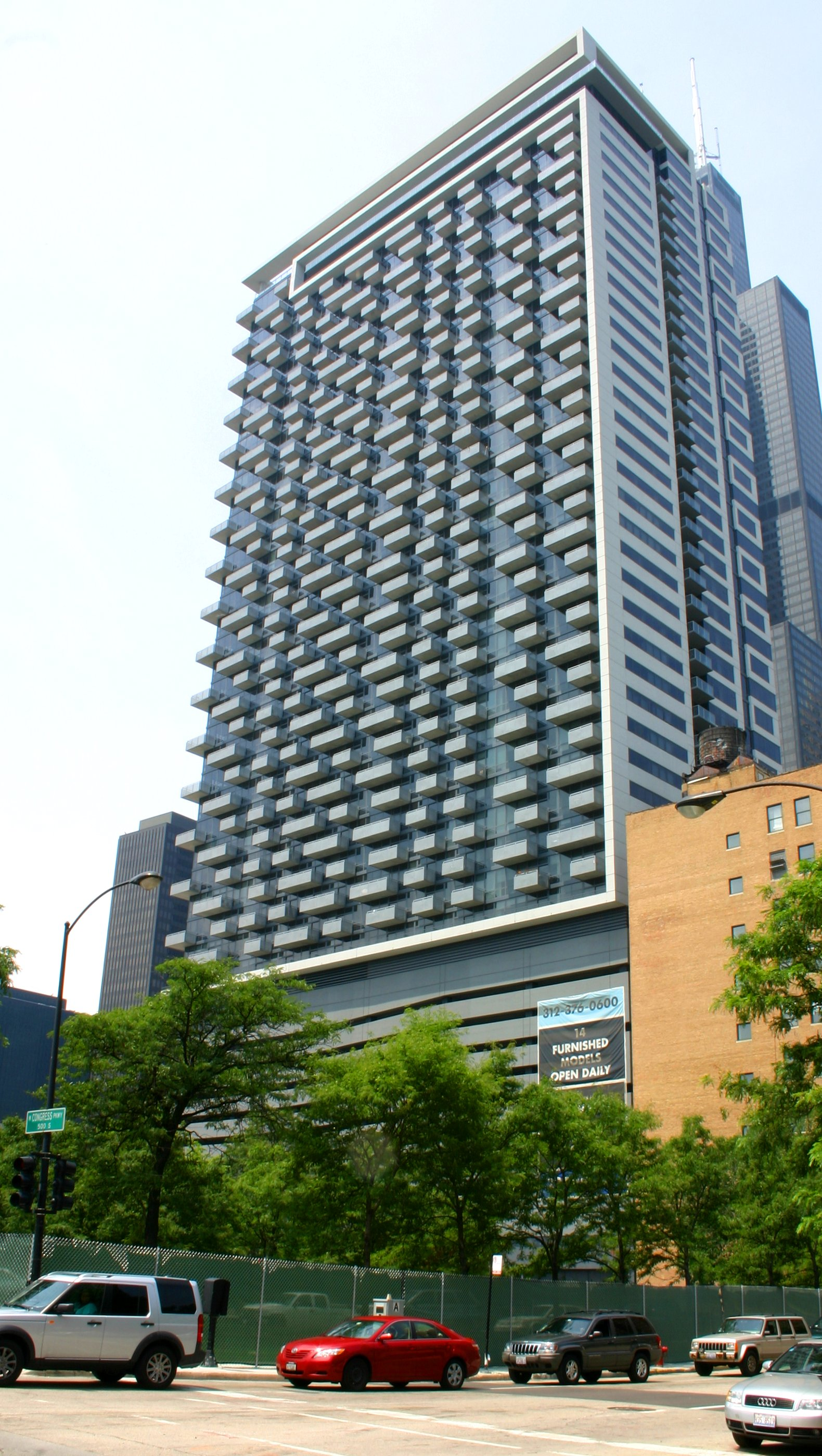
235 Van Buren

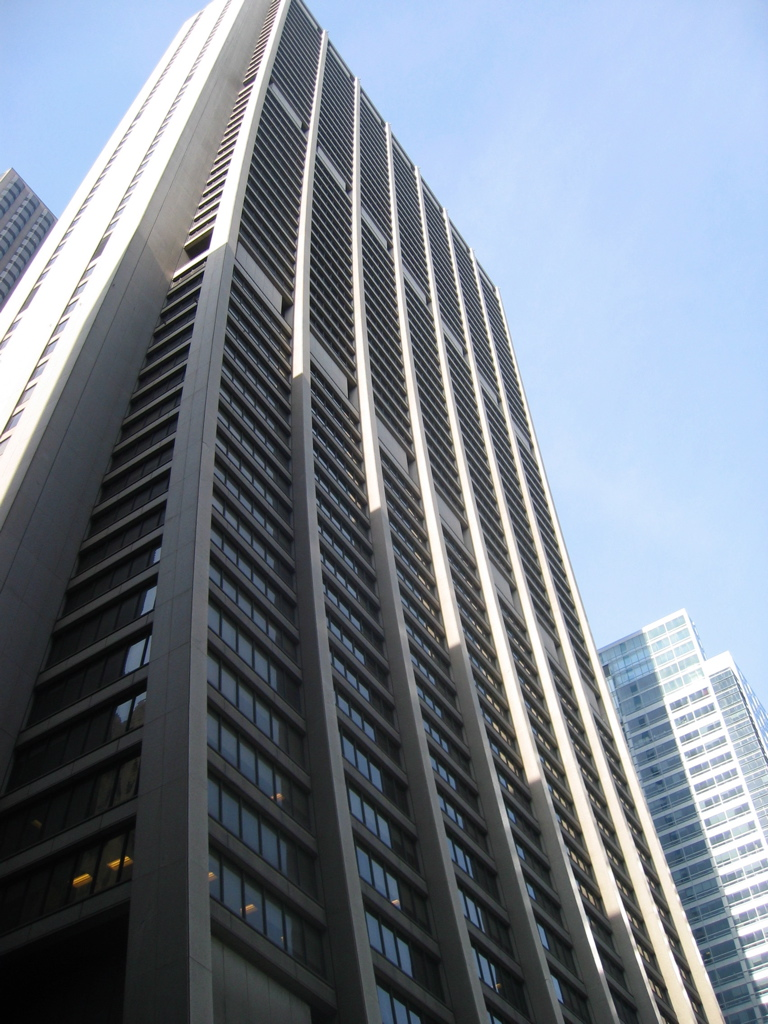
Chase Tower (Chicago)

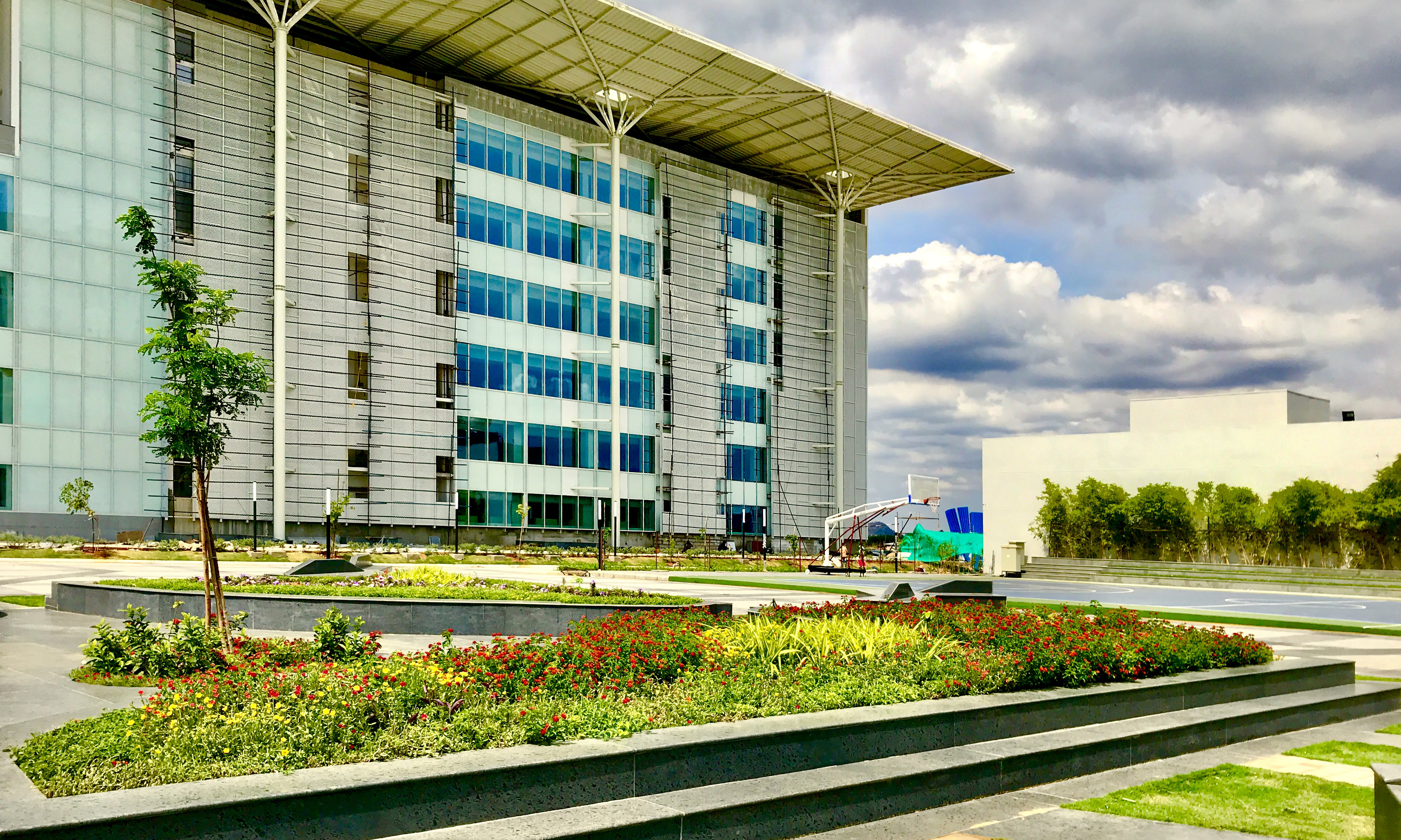
SRM University in Amaravati

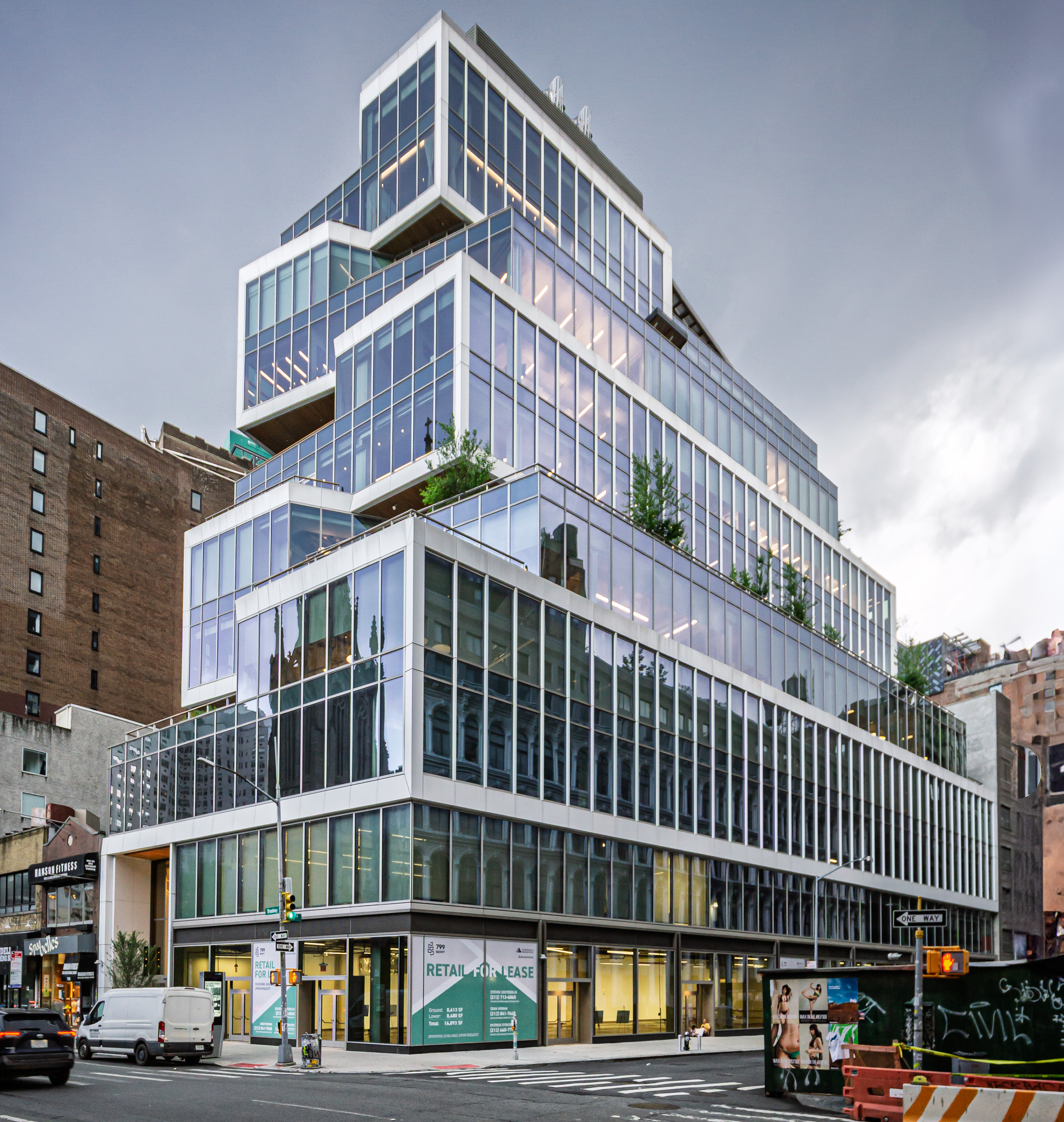
799 Broadway, New York City

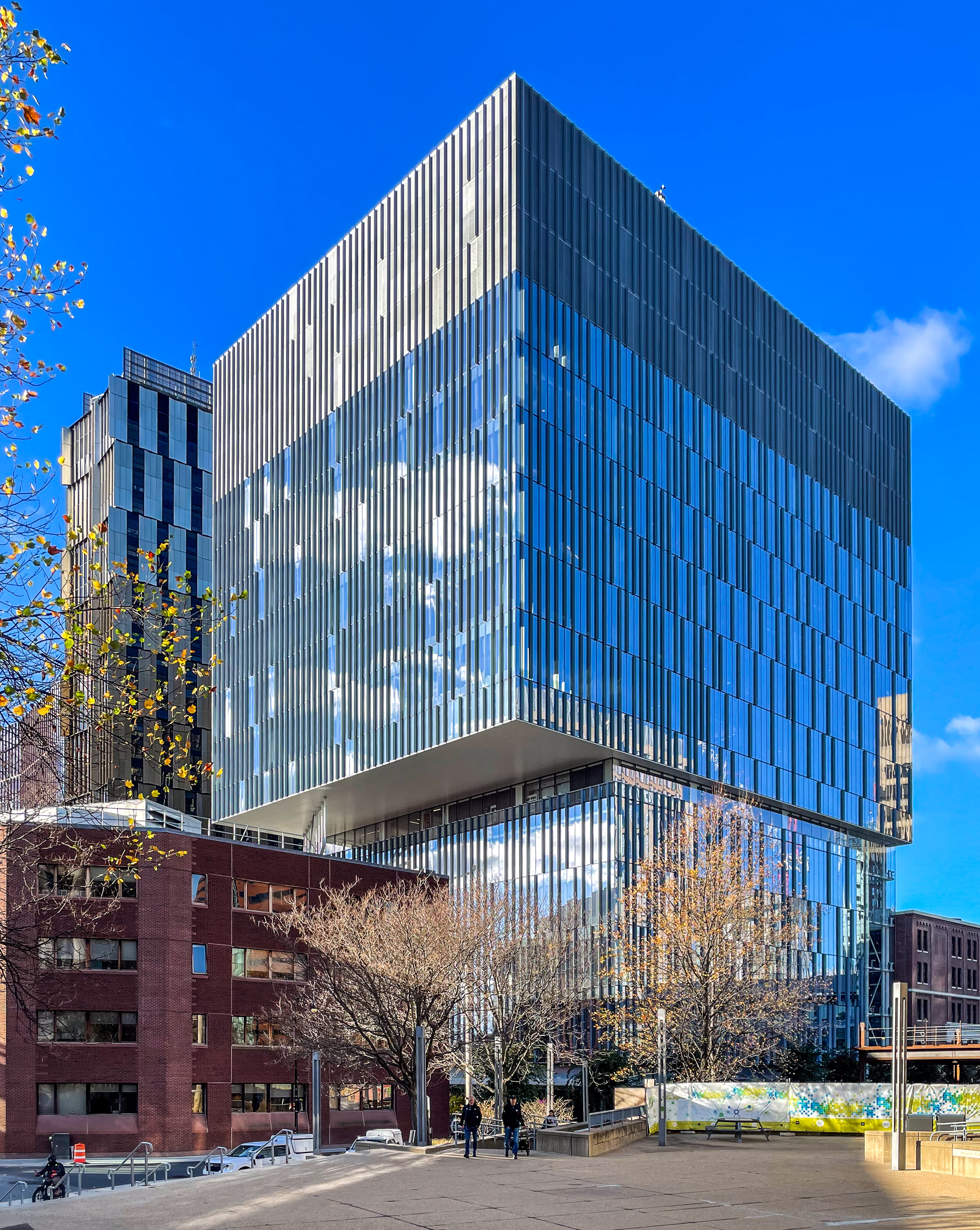
SoMa Site 3 Lab Building, Cambridge

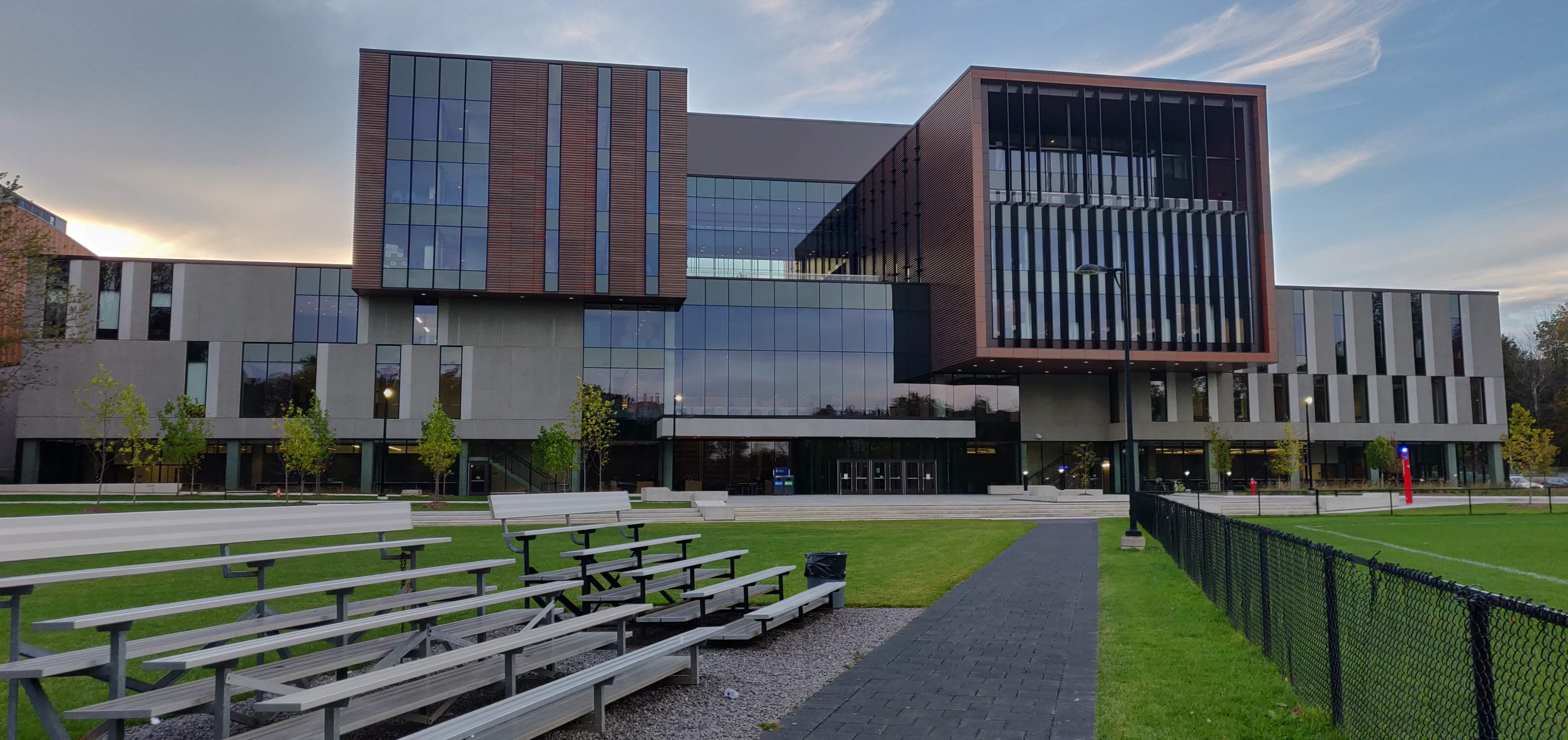
Maanjiwe nendamowinan, U of T Mississauga, Canada

- 235 Van Buren, Chicago, Illinois
- 799 Broadway, New York City
- Antilia, Mumbai, Maharashtra, India
- Boeing International Headquarters, Chicago, Illinois
- Bridgestone Tower, Nashville, Tennessee
- Chase Tower (Chicago), Chicago, Illinois
- The Clare, Chicago, Illinois
- Concordia International School Shanghai, Shanghai, China
- Cornell University College of Engineering, Ithaca, New York; complex of seven buildings in the 1950s, including Upson Hall
- Crow Island School, Winnetka, Illinois
- Duke University Fuqua School of Business, Durham, North Carolina
- Fort Collins High School, Fort Collins, Colorado
- GlenOak High School, Plain Township, Ohio
- Halifax Central Library, Nova Scotia
- International School of Beijing, Beijing, China
- Klaus Advanced Computing Building, Georgia Tech, Atlanta, Georgia
- Maanjiwe nendamowinan, University of Toronto Mississauga, Canada
- Peggy Notebaert Nature Museum, Chicago, Illinois
- Philadelphia Pennsylvania Temple, The Church of Jesus Christ of Latter-day Saints, Philadelphia, Pennsylvania
- Princess Nourah Bint Abdul Rahman University, Riyadh, Saudi Arabia
- Proviso West High School, Hillside, Illinois
- Riley Towers, Indianapolis, Indiana
- Ruth M. Rothstein CORE Center, Chicago, Illinois
- Signature Place, St. Petersburg, Florida
- SoLo House, British Columbia, Canada
- SoMa Site 3 Lab Building, Cambridge
- SRM University, Amaravati, India
- True North Square, Winnipeg, Manitoba
- Tufts University, Granoff Music Center, Boston
- University at Buffalo, Davis Hall Building, UB's North Campus, Amherst, NY

== Awards ==
- 2008 CoreNet Sustainability Leadership Award for Sustainable Development
- 2008 BusinessWeek and Architectural Record "Good Design is Good Business" Award for Haworth Headquarters
- 2009 and 2008 Practice Greenhealth Champion for Change Award
- 2009 COTE Top 10 Green Projects, Dockside Green and Great River Energy
- 2010 National Building Museum's Honor Award for Civic Innovation, the first architectural firm to be a recipient.
- 2015 American Planning Association's National Planning Excellence Award for a Planning Firm

== See also ==
- List of architecture firms
