= Boeing Building =

Skyscraper in Chicago, Illinois

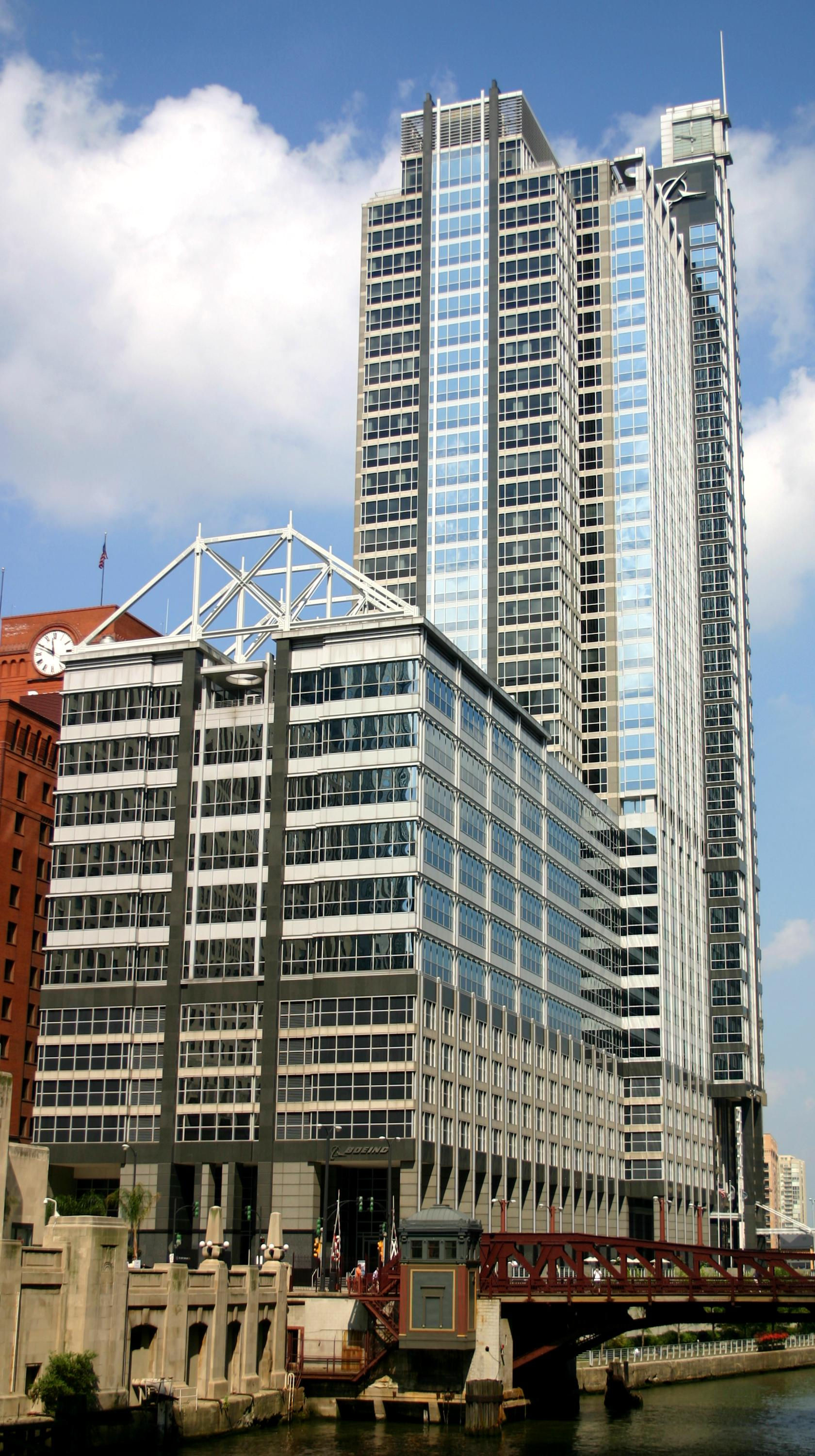
- Interactive map of the Boeing Building area

General information
- Location: 100 North Riverside Plaza; Chicago, Illinois
- Coordinates: 41°53′2.8″N 87°38′19.5″W
- Construction started: 1988
- Completed: 1990
- Cost: $170 million (equivalent to $419 million in 2025)
- Owner: Boeing

Height
- Roof: 561 feet (171 m)

Technical details
- Floor count: 36
- Floor area: 770,300 square feet (71,600 m^{2})

Design and construction
- Architect: Perkins and Will

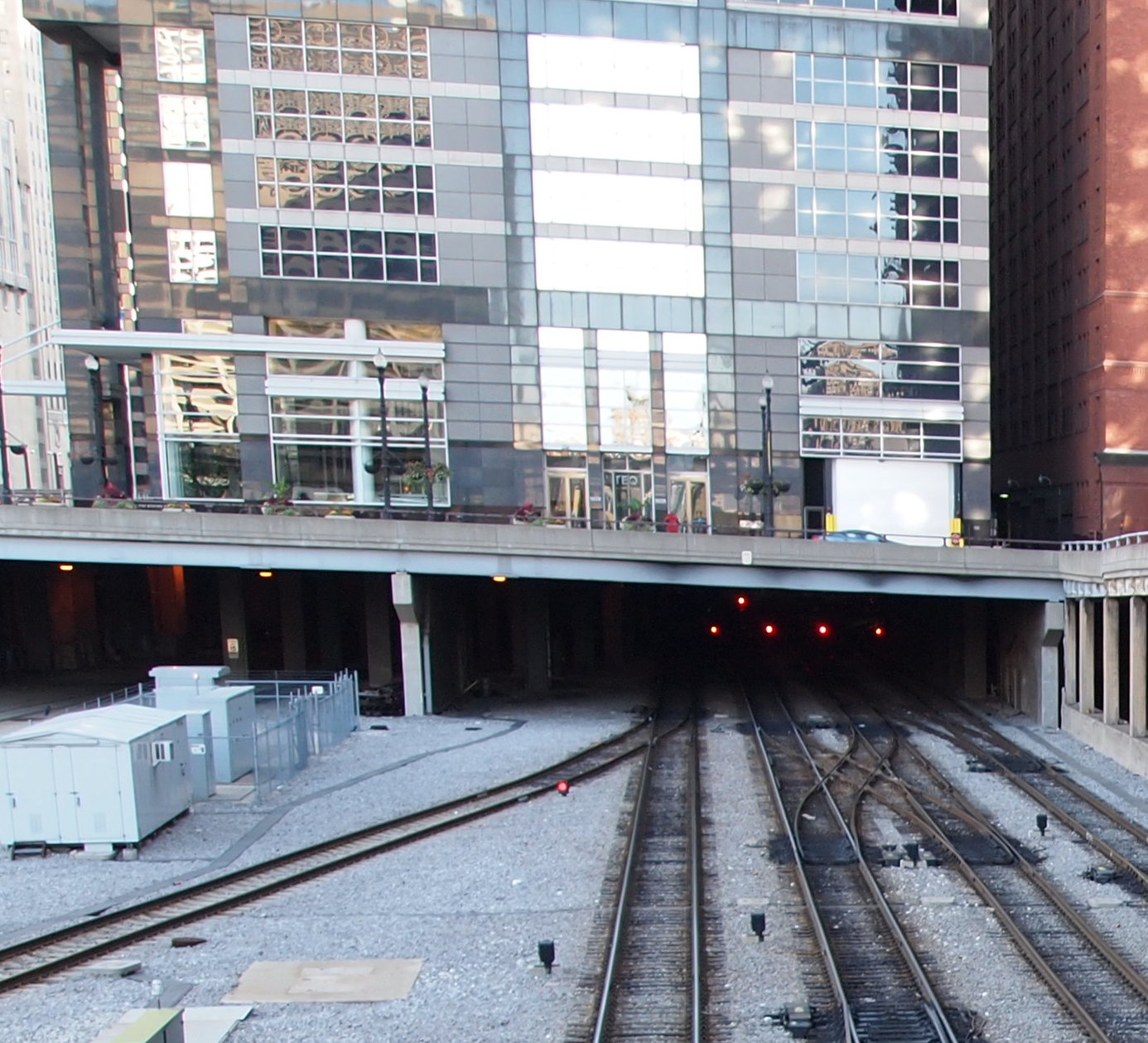
The building was constructed atop active railroad tracks, necessitating a complex structural support system

The Boeing Building (formerly known as the Boeing International Headquarters and previously to that as the Morton-Thiokol International Building) is a 36-floor skyscraper located in the Near West Side of Chicago. The building, at 100 North Riverside Plaza, is located on the west side of the Chicago River directly across from the downtown Loop. The building was designed with a structural system that uses steel trusses to support its suspended southwest corner in order to clear the Metra railroad tracks immediately beneath it.

The building was originally constructed for the Morton Salt Company in 1990, but became largely vacant a decade later after the company was acquired and downsized. Boeing moved its corporate headquarters there in 2001 when they opted to leave Seattle for Chicago. By 2021, with Boeing executives handling political and economical fallout from the Boeing 737 MAX groundings and the impact of the COVID-19 pandemic on aviation, Reuters reported that the shift in priorities rendered the building a "ghost town". Boeing ultimately announced the following year that it would move its corporate headquarters to Arlington, Virginia, where its defense division is located; the division relocated there from St. Louis in 2017.

== See also ==
- Chicago architecture
- List of tallest buildings in Chicago
- List of towers
