= Todd Rose =

American Scientist (Born: 1974)

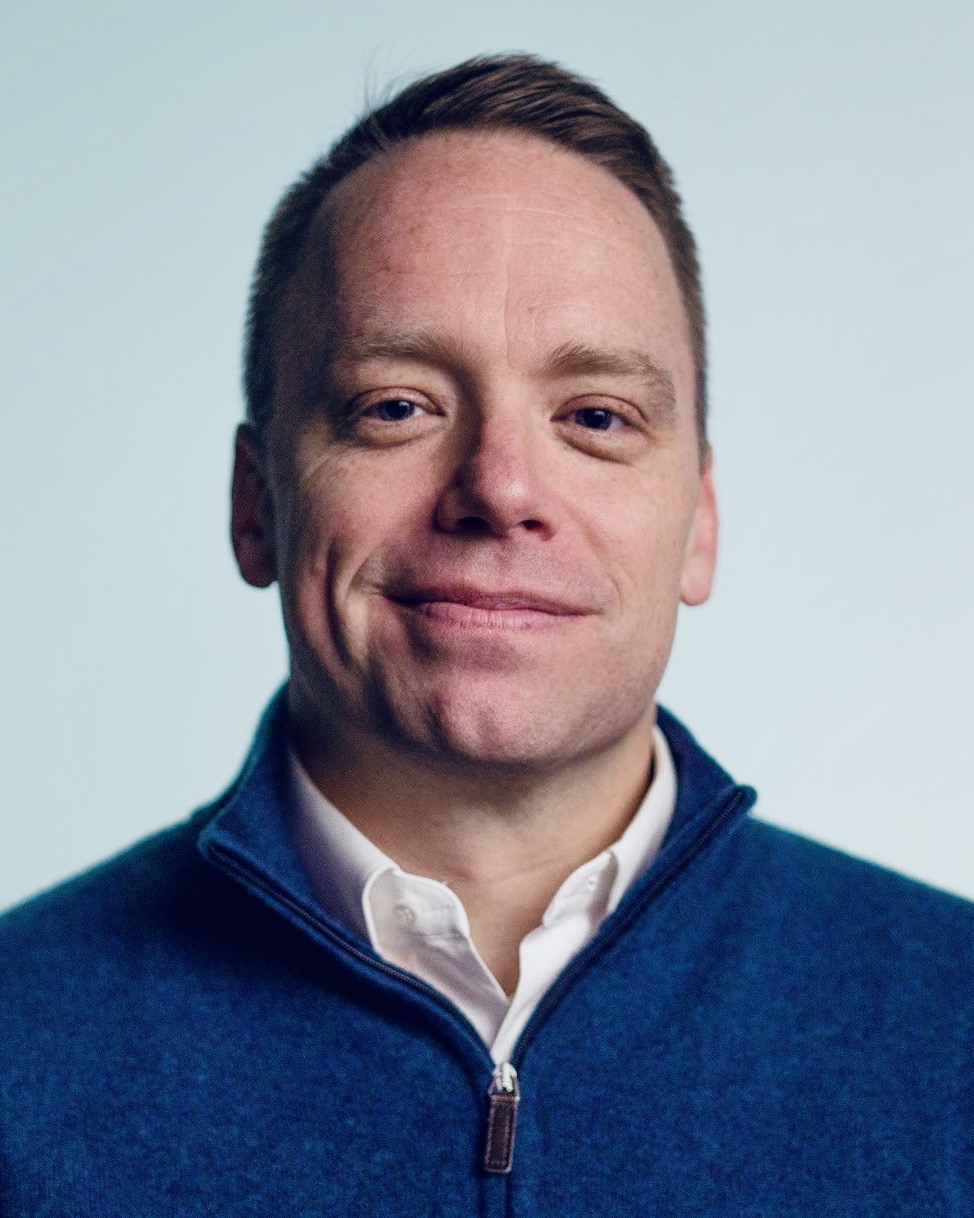
- Born: Larry Todd Rose; November 28, 1974 (age 51)
- Education: Weber State University; Harvard Graduate School of Education
- Occupations: Scientist, author, professor, social entrepreneur
- Writing career
- Subjects: Developmental psychology; Learning science; Educational neuroscience; Science of the individual
- Notable works: Collective Illusions, Dark Horse; The End of Average, Square Peg

Larry Todd Rose (born November 28, 1974) is an American scientist, author, professor and social entrepreneur. He is known for being the co-founder and CEO of Populace, a Boston-based think tank. Prior to Populace, Rose was a professor at Harvard University where he served as the faculty director of the Mind, Brain, and Education program, as well as led the Laboratory for the Science of Individuality.

Rose is a scientist in developmental psychology known for his work applying dynamical systems principles to the study of development, intelligence, and learning, and for his contributions to the field of Educational Neuroscience. His research focus is in the area of the Science of the Individual, with an emphasis on applying insights about individuality to issues of human potential, talent development, and the design of social institutions.

He is also the author of the books Collective Illusions, Dark Horse, The End of Average, and Square Peg.

== Early life and education ==
Rose was born in Ogden, Utah in 1974. He has stated publicly that he struggled in school from an early age, and that he dropped out of Layton High School his senior year (1993), as at the time, he had a 0.9 GPA. In 1995, after being on welfare and working multiple minimum wage jobs to support his late wife and two children, he obtained his GED and started attending night classes at a local college. Rose eventually received a Bachelor of Science in psychology from Weber State University (2000), as well as a master's degree in Mind, Brain, and Education (2001) and a Doctorate in Human Development (2007) from the Harvard Graduate School of Education, where he worked with notable psychologist Kurt W. Fischer. He also completed a postdoctoral fellowship with the Laboratory for Visual Learning at the Center for Astrophysics | Harvard & Smithsonian (2008).

== Career ==
=== Research ===
Rose's research focus is in the area of the Science of the Individual. His TEDx talk, "The Myth of Average", communicates the basic principles of the science of the individual and shows how its findings can be harnessed by parents, teachers, managers, and individuals to improve performance. In an excerpt from the book, End of Average, Rose relates that in the 1940s, after multiple flying accidents, the US Air Force required adjustable airplane cockpit equipment when measurements revealed zero pilots were in the average range of 10 body measurements from a population of 4,063 pilots. The measurements revealed that with only three of the ten size measurements, neck circumference, thigh circumference and wrist circumference, fewer than 3.5 per cent of pilots would fit within the average sizes on the three measurements. If a cockpit was designed for an average pilot, the cockpit fit no pilot.

Rose has also introduced the concept of Collective Illusion(s), the phenomenon of people holding an opinion that is widely shared but that they believe is theirs alone thus staying silent from fear of persecution or rejection. Through his work, he has shown that this illusion affects people in any society that demands a certain kind of cultural conformity.

=== Populace ===
To socialize insights from the Science of the Individual, and use its findings to advance public systems and culture change, Rose co-founded Populace with Parisa Rouhani. Populace is a Boston-based 501(c)3 think tank focused on advancing opportunities, so all people have the chance to live fulfilling lives in a thriving society.

In 2022, Populace conducted a survey to measure what the public would prioritize about the K-12 education system in America. The survey called the Purpose of Education Index was a private opinion survey, which showed the gaps between public expectations and actual outcomes, giving findings into trust, relevance and perceived value in education systems. In 2023, the think tank conducted another private opinion survey, called Success Index, about the concept of the American Dream. The findings of the survey showed that Americans now prioritize personal achievements, such as financial independence, enjoying work, parenthood and secure retirement, over fame and wealth. Populace has also conducted a survey, called Social Pressure Index, which measures the gap between Americans' private beliefs and public opinions on sensitive topics, based on over 19,000 nationally representative responses. The survey was done in partnership with Gradient and YouGov.

== Books ==
Rose authored the book, Collective Illusions: Conformity, Complicity, and the Science of Why We Make Bad Decisions (ISBN 978-0306925689) and released it in 2022. The book reveals collective illusions, when people in a group adopt a view they don't agree with because they mistakenly believe others support it, leading to actions nobody truly wants. It was published by Hachette Books in New York.

He co-authored the book, Dark Horse: Achieving success through the pursuit of fulfillment (ISBN 9780063000247), with Ogi Ogas in 2018. The book, published by HarperCollins, talks about the interests and abilities of people in society that nobody expects to be successful, but are successful in their own way.

In 2015, he wrote The End of Average: How We Succeed in a World That Values Sameness (ISBN 9780062358387), a book published by HarperOne, about the measurement of human potential through a one-size-fits-all model which is incorrect as each individual has different capabilities.

He also co-authored Square Peg: My Story and What it Means for Raising Innovators, Visionaries, and Out of the Box Thinkers (ISBN 9781401324278) with Katherine Ellison and published it in 2013 with Hachette Books. In this book, Rose shares his personal story and provides insights to the current American school system which could help each student distinctly.

== Notable publications ==
- Osher, D., Cantor, P., Berg, J., Steyer, L., & Rose, T. (2020). Drivers of human development: How relationships and context shape learning and development. Applied Developmental Science, 24(1), 6-36.
- Cantor, P., Osher, D., Berg, J., Steyer, L., & Rose, T. (2019). Malleability, plasticity, and individuality: How children learn and develop in context1. Applied Developmental Science, 23(4), 307–337.
- Rifai, N., Rose, T., McMahon, G. T., Saxberg, B., & Christensen, U. J. (2018). Learning in the 21st Century: Concepts and Tools. Clinical chemistry, 64(10), 1423–1429.
- Stafford‐Brizard, K. B., Cantor, P., & Rose, L. T. (2017). Building the bridge between science and practice: Essential characteristics of a translational framework. Mind, Brain, and Education, 11(4), 155–165.
- Rose, L. T., Rouhani, P., & Fischer, K. W. (2013). The science of the individual. Mind, Brain, and Education, 7(3), 152–158.
- Rose, L.T., & Fischer, K.F. (2011). Garbage in, garbage out: Having useful data is everything. Measurement, 9, 222–226.
- Rose, L.T., Daley, S.G., & Rose, D.H. (2011). Let the questions be your guide: MBE as interdisciplinary science. Mind, Brain, and Education, 5(4), 153–162.
- Rose, L.T., & Fischer, K.W. (2011). The dynamics of childhood intelligence. In R.J. Sternberg & S.B. Kaufman (Eds.) The Cambridge Handbook of Intelligence. Cambridge, UK: Cambridge University Press.
- Rose, L.T., & Fischer, K.W. (2009). Dynamic systems theory. In R. Shweder, T. Bidell, A. Dailey et al. (Eds.), The child: An encyclopedic companion. Chicago: University of Chicago Press.
- Rose, L.T., & Fischer, K.W. (2009). Dynamic development: A neo-Piagetian approach. In U. Mueller, J.M. Carpendale, & Smith, L. (Eds.), The Cambridge Companion to Piaget, Cambridge, UK: Cambridge University Press.
- Schneps, M.H., Rose, L.T., Martinez-Conde, S., & Pomplun, M. (2009). Covert orienting reflex: Involuntary pupil response predicts microsaccade production. Vision, 9(8), 399.
- Schneps, M.H., Rose, L.T., & Fischer, K.W. (2007). Visual learning and the brain. Mind, Brain, and Education, 1(3), 128–139.
- Fischer, K.W., & Rose, L.T., & Rose, S. (2007). Growth cycles of mind and brain: Analyzing developmental pathways of learning disorders. In K.W. Fischer, J.H. Bernstein, & Immordino-Yang, M.H. (Eds.), Mind, Brain, & Education in Reading Disorders. Cambridge University Press.
- Paré-Blagoev, E. J., Cestnick, L., Rose, L.T., Clark, J., Misra, M., Katzir-Cohen, T., & Poldrack, R. (2002). The neural basis of phonological awareness in normal-reading children examined using functional magnetic resonance imaging. Journal of Cognitive Neuroscience, F53, 159.
- Fischer, K.W., & Rose, L.T. (2001). Webs of skill: How students learn. Educational Leadership, 59, 6–12.
- McVaugh, W., Mabrey, I., & Rose, L.T. (2000). Learning styles and knowledge learned in web and traditional college courses. International Journal of Psychology, S35, 247.

== Personal life ==
Rose is the son of Larry and Lyda (Burton). He is the oldest of five siblings and spent the early years of his life in Hooper, Utah. He later relocated with his family to Layton, Utah before moving to Cambridge, Massachusetts. As of 2022, Rose and his family live in Burlington, Massachusetts.
