= Reading readiness =

Transition from non-reader to reader

Reading readiness has been defined as the point at which a person is ready to learn to read and the time during which a person transitions from being a non-reader into a reader. Other terms for reading readiness include early literacy and emergent reading.

Children begin to learn pre-reading skills at birth while they listen to the speech around them. In order to learn to read, a child must first have knowledge of the oral language. According to the Ontario Government (2003), the acquisition of language is natural, but the process of learning to read is not—reading must be taught. This belief contradicts basic language philosophy, which states that children learn to read while they learn to speak. The Ontario Government (2003) also believes that reading is the foundation for success, and that those children who struggle with reading in grades 1–3 are at a disadvantage in terms of academic success, compared to those children who are not struggling.

Reading readiness is highly individualistic. There is no "one size fits all" solution to teaching a child to read. A parent or educator may need to employ several techniques before finding the most appropriate method for an individual child. According to Vygotsky's Zone of Proximal Development a child can, through the help of an adult or more capable child, perform at a higher level than he or she can independently.

== Reading readiness skills ==
Skills that indicate whether a child is ready to learn to read include:

- Age-appropriate oral language development and vocabulary
- Appreciation of stories and books
- Phonemic awareness (ability to distinguish and manipulate individual sounds of language)
- Understanding of basic print concepts (for example, printed text represents spoken words; spaces between words are meaningful; pages written in English are read left to right starting at the top of the page; books have a title and an author, and so on).
- Understanding of the alphabetic principle (letters represent the sounds of language)
- Ability to distinguish shapes (visual discrimination)
- Ability to identify at least some letters of the alphabet.

== Instructional programs for reading ==
Whole language: With this model, language is kept whole rather than segmented into fragments or skills. Within this philosophy, children are expected to learn to read and write in the same manner that they learn to talk. Reading, writing and oral language are considered to be intertwined. Some strategies according to the whole language model include encouraging the child to learn to read by "reading," and making up stories that they think go along with the pictures in the book. This model also believes that adults should allow the child to witness reading behaviors, such as holding a book properly. It is also important for adults to model these behaviors in an environment that is free from criticism (Matthews, Klassen and Walter, 1999). An early proponent of whole language reading instruction called reading a "psycholinguistic guessing game," and thus children are taught to guess words that they don't know by using context clues. Skipping unknown words is encouraged, and "inventive" spelling is also acceptable.

Phonics: This approach involves teaching the correspondence between graphemes (spelling patterns) and phonemes (sounds).

== Influential perspectives ==
The two most influential perspectives are the growth-readiness view and the environmentalist view. The growth-readiness view focuses on the internal workings of the child in order to determine readiness, while environmentalists focus on the external environment. Both internal factors such as genetics and environmental aspects such as school atmosphere can influence a child's readiness for reading.

== See also ==
- Reading
- Reading § Learning to read
- Reading § Teaching reading
