= The End of Average =

2016 book by Todd Rose

The End of Average: How We Succeed in a World That Values Sameness
- Author: Todd Rose
- Language: English
- Subjects: Personal success, applied psychology, probability and statistics
- Publisher: HarperCollins
- Publication date: 2016
- Publication place: United States
- Pages: 256
- ISBN: 978-0-06-235836-3 (hardcover)

The End of Average: How We Succeed in a World That Values Sameness is a book by Todd Rose. It was published by HarperCollins in 2016, and talks about the importance of individuality rather than the concept of average human beings.

In this book, the author argues that no individual can be accurately labeled as average. He presents an alternative to understanding individuals solely based on averages. He introduces three principles of individuality - the jaggedness principle (talent is always uneven), the context principle (traits are not fixed), and the pathways principle (we often take unconventional routes).

According to The New York Times, “Readers will be moved to examine their own averagerian prejudices, most so ingrained as to be almost invisible, all worthy of review.” As per Kirkus Reviews, the book is “an intriguing view into the evolution and imperfections of our current system but lacks a clear path toward implementing the proposed principles of individuality.”
