= Crow Island School =

School in Winnetka, Illinois

- U.S. National Register of Historic Places
- U.S. National Historic Landmark
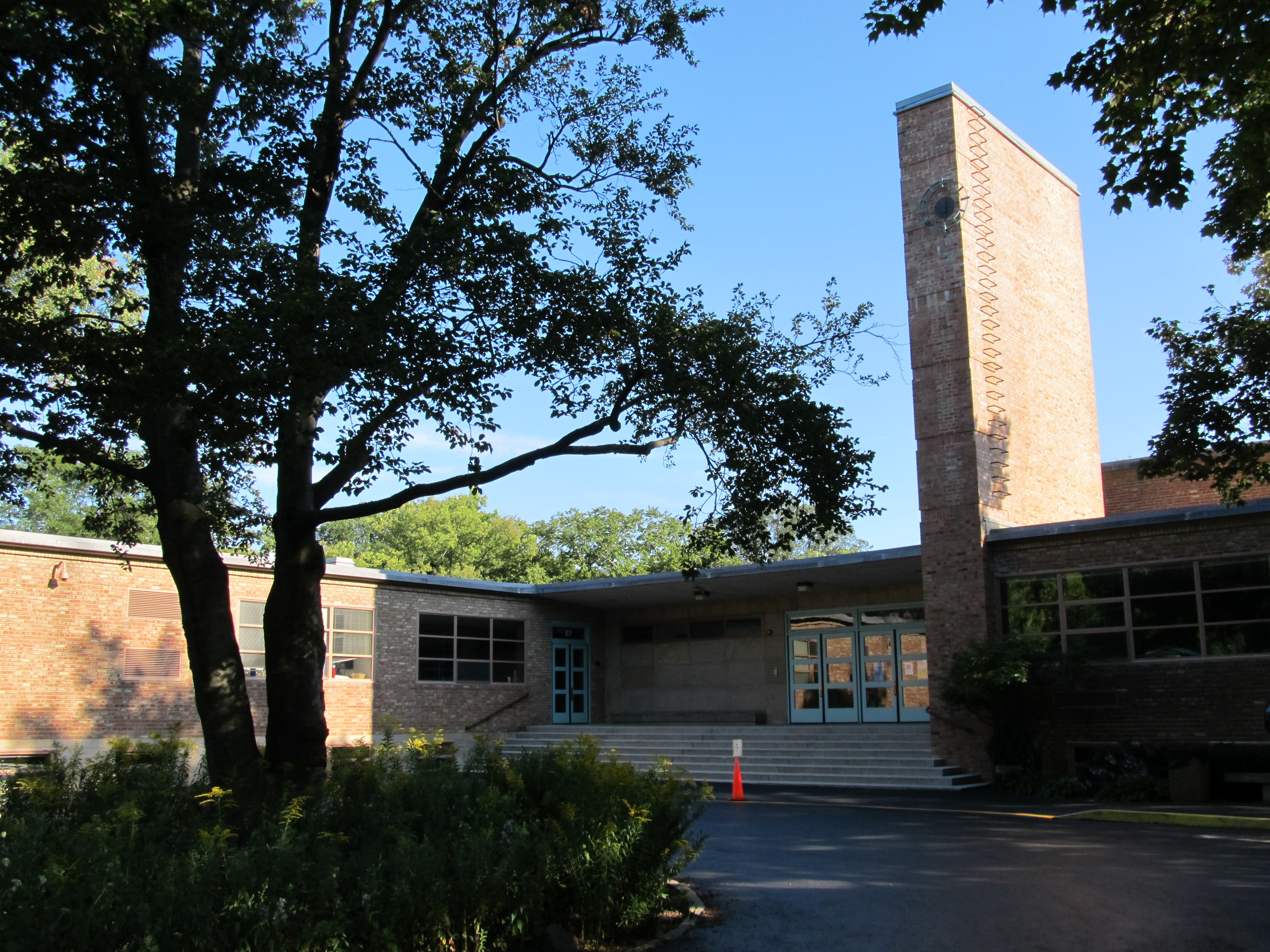

- Location within Illinois Location within the United States
- Location: 1112 Willow Road; Winnetka, Illinois 60093
- Coordinates: 42°6′2″N 87°44′45″W
- Built: 1940
- Architect: Eliel Saarinen; Eero Saarinen; Perkins, Wheeler & Will
- Architectural style: International Style
- NRHP reference No.: 89001730

Significant dates
- Added to NRHP: October 27, 1989
- Designated NHL: December 14, 1990

Crow Island School in Winnetka, Illinois, is an elementary school operated by Winnetka Public Schools. It is significant for its progressive philosophy and its International Style architecture. The building was designed jointly by the Chicago firm of Perkins, Wheeler and Will, along with Eliel and Eero Saarinen. It currently serves kindergarten through fourth grade students. The school was established in 1940-41. Sebastian Hinton's prototype "jungle gym" was located here, having been moved from Horace Mann School in 1940 and then relocated to the Winnetka Historical Society in 2010. The school was awarded the Twenty-five Year Award by the American Institute of Architects in 1971. It was declared a National Historic Landmark in 1990. In celebration of the 2018 Illinois Bicentennial, Crow Island School was selected as one of the Illinois 200 Great Places by the American Institute of Architects Illinois component (AIA Illinois).

== Background ==
Progressive education flourished in the 1920s and continued to develop in the 1930s. However, because of economic hardship during the Great Depression, few new schools had been built to accommodate the movement. Carleton Washburne was a regional leader in progressive thought and, as superintendent of schools in Winnetka, Illinois, sought to establish a new school.

Larry Perkins, Philip Will, Jr., and Todd Wheeler had recently formed the architectural firm and this was one of their first commissions. Perkins was the son of Dwight H. Perkins, the former Chief Architect for the Chicago Board of Education; the elder Perkins designed two schools in Winnetka. The Perkins family had connections on the Winnetka School Board as well as superintendent Washburne. Although Washburne was interested in the firm's modern approach to architecture, he was concerned about their lack of experience. He changed his mind when Larry Perkins suggested a collaboration with Eliel and Eero Saarinen. The Saarinens, who were interested in an innovative educational project, agreed for the two firms to collaborate.

== Design ==
Perkins, Wheeler & Will was responsible for the bulk of the early design. They interviewed students and teachers about the project and sat in on classes. They had to design the building for the modest sum of $287,000 (equivalent to $6,596,000 in 2025) in construction cost. A site for the school was selected on Crow Island, a high spot in the Skokie Marsh bordering the Crow Island Woods. The swamp was filled with landfill from two Works Progress Administration projects in the area: the Skokie Lagoons Project and a track depression for the Chicago and North Western Railway. John McFadzean and Robert Everly were consulted to design a park-like atmosphere for the school grounds.

The school has four wings emerging from a central building with common rooms. This design allows each classroom to have its own outdoor courtyard. Each wing also has its own playground, two of which feature experimental examples of a jungle gym. The Saarinens designed a hexagonal sandbox for the northwest wing. The main entrance is under a chimney overhang on the west, with an additional entrance for the kindergarten on the east. The one-story building is flat with the exception of a 50-foot (15 m) chimney emerging from the north face, providing a "fifth wing" stretching vertically.

The school was one of the first to be designed in the international style of architecture in North America. Its aesthetics and form, although not its planning or educational model, soon became a template for mid-century and factory model schools.

Perkins, Wheeler & Will used the profits from the design to commission Hedrich Blessing Photographers to photograph the building. Perkins & Will went on to design over five hundred schools.

== See also ==
- List of works by Eero Saarinen
- National Register of Historic Places listings in Cook County, Illinois
- List of National Historic Landmarks in Illinois
