= Dumbing Us Down =

Non-fiction book by John Taylor Gatto

Dumbing Us Down: The Hidden Curriculum of Compulsory Schooling
- First edition
- Author: John Taylor Gatto
- Cover artist: Diane McIntosh
- Language: English
- Subject: Education & Teaching, Current Affairs
- Genre: Non-fiction
- Publisher: New Society Publishers
- Publication date: 1992
- Media type: Paperback and hardcover
- Pages: 106 (paperback and hardcover)
- ISBN: 0-86571-448-7
- OCLC: 49304855
- Text: Dumbing Us Down: The Hidden Curriculum of Compulsory Schooling at Internet Archive

Dumbing Us Down: The Hidden Curriculum of Compulsory Schooling is a non-fiction book written by American teacher and political communitarian John Taylor Gatto. It has sold over 200,000 copies and consists of a multitude of speeches given by the author. The book proposes that radical change is needed to the American educational system to turn around the negative socialization that children receive.

== Main thesis ==
Gatto asserted that compulsory schooling:

1. Confuses the students. It presents an incoherent ensemble of information that the child needs to memorize to stay in school. Apart from the tests and trials, this programming is similar to the television; it fills almost all the "free" time of children. One sees and hears something, only to forget it again.
2. Teaches them to accept their class affiliation.
3. Makes them indifferent.
4. Makes them emotionally dependent.
5. Makes them intellectually dependent.
6. Teaches them a kind of self-confidence that requires constant confirmation by experts (provisional self-esteem).
7. Makes it clear to them that they cannot hide, because they are always supervised.

He also draws a contrast between communities and "networks", with the former being healthy, and schools being examples of the latter. He says networks have become an unhealthy substitute for community in the United States.

Gatto's book aimed to inspire education advocates and the inception of Praxis tests. This testing measured academic competence and knowledge of specific subjects required for teaching. Praxis tests are taken by potential educators as part of certification required by state and professional licensing entities.

Wade A. Carpenter, associate professor of education at Berry College, described the work as "one-sided, angry and hyperbolic, [but] not inaccurate".
