= Exodus Mandate =

Exodus Mandate, based in Columbia, South Carolina, United States, is a wholly owned project of Frontline Ministries, Inc., a 501(c)(3) non-profit organization. It promotes a withdrawal of Christian students from the K12 public school system and into evangelical Christian schools or homeschooling. Founded in 1997 by Rev. E. Ray Moore and Rev. Lee Adams of Frontline Ministries, Inc., the organization's motto is "Christian Children Need Christian Education".

== Activity ==
Exodus Mandate's activities center around communicating their mission to the United States' conservative Christian demographic. The ministry's efforts are complementary to and cooperative with other evangelical Christian organizations and ministries, such as Family Renewal, the American Family Association, Foundation for American Christian Education, Christian Education Initiative, Issues in Education, The Great Education Forum, The Old Schoolhouse magazine, Nehemiah Institute, Deconstructing the Coliseum, Renewanation, Creation Studies Institute, and Generations.

In May 2007, the group put forth a resolution supporting Southern Baptist Convention president Dr. Frank Page's call for Southern Baptist churches to found more Christian schools and encourage Southern Baptist parents to send their children to these institutions.

In October 2007, Exodus Mandate held its 10-year anniversary banquet. During the banquet, co-founder E. Ray Moore instituted the inaugural Dr. Robert Dreyfus "Courageous Christian Award" to recognize Christian leadership that, according to the organization, "honors and recognizes a Christian leader who has exhibited moral courage while advancing Christianity in the culture and life of the nation through his unique contribution to the Church."

In October 2010, the ministry collaborated with Colin Gunn Productions and Joaquin Fernandez to create a documentary titled IndoctriNation: Public Schools and the Decline of Christianity in America. This documentary was released with E. Ray Moore as co-executive producer, along with Dr. Richard Jones. On 25 February 2012, the film won the Jubilee Award as the Best Documentary at the San Antonio Independent Christian Film Festival. In August 2012, the IndoctriNation book was published, with E. Ray Moore as one of the contributing authors.

In August 2015, Exodus Mandate partnered with Cutting Edge Films, Inc. to release the 60-minute documentary, Escaping Common Core: Setting our Children Free. Cutting Edge Films, Inc. directed and produced the documentary with E. Ray Moore as the executive producer and co-script writer with Cory Black.

In March 2017, the ministry's co-founder, E. Ray Moore, was a featured guest on Dr. James Dobson's Family Talk radio program for a two-part interview on Exodus Mandate's mission. The show was re-run in December of the same year.

In November 2017, Exodus Mandate celebrated its 20-year anniversary with a banquet headlined by American writer and cultural commentator Cal Thomas.

In September 2024, Exodus Mandate's parent organization, Frontline Ministries, Inc., celebrated its 30-year anniversary with a banquet headlined by Carl Broggi, Senior Pastor of Community Bible Church in Beaufort, South Carolina.
