= The Underground History of American Education =

Critique of the U.S. education system by John Taylor Gatto

The Underground History of American Education: A Schoolteacher’s Intimate Investigation Into the Problem of Modern Schooling
- First edition
- Author: John Taylor Gatto
- Language: English
- Subject: Education, History
- Genre: Non-fiction
- Publisher: Oxford Village Press
- Publication date: 2000
- Publication place: United States
- Media type: Paperback and Hardcover
- Pages: 412 (Paperback)
- ISBN: 0-945700-04-0 (Paperback), ISBN 0-945700-05-9 (Hardcover)
- OCLC: 45004688
- Dewey Decimal: 811/.54 20
- LC Class: PS3557.R1987 O5 1993
- Text: The Underground History of American Education: A Schoolteacher’s Intimate Investigation Into the Problem of Modern Schooling at Internet Archive

The Underground History of American Education: A Schoolteacher’s Intimate Investigation Into the Problem of Modern Schooling (ISBN 0-945700-05-9, pbk. ISBN 0-945700-04-0) is a critique of the United States education system by John Taylor Gatto.

A former teacher, Gatto left the classroom the same year he was named New York State Teacher of the Year. He announced his decision in a letter titled "I Quit, I Think".

Using anecdotes gathered from thirty years of teaching, alongside documentation, Gatto presents his view of modern compulsion schooling as opposed to genuine education, describing a "conflict between systems which offer physical safety and certainty at the cost of suppressing free will, and those which offer liberty at the price of constant risk". Gatto argues that educational strategies promoted by government and industry leaders for over a century included the creation of a system that keeps real power in the hands of very few people.

From the book's Introduction:

"... Underground History isn’t a history proper, but a collection of materials toward a history, embedded in a personal essay analyzing why mass compulsion schooling is unreformable. The history I have unearthed is important to our understanding; it’s a good start, I believe, but much remains undone."

"... what I’m trying to describe [is] that what has happened to our schools was inherent in the original design for a planned economy and a planned society laid down so proudly at the end of the nineteenth century."

The book was read from 2006-2007 for the Unwelcome Guests radio show.

== Editions ==
Oxford Scholars Press released a revised edition of the book in 2017, featuring a foreword is by U.S. Congressman Ron Paul, an introduction by David Ruenzel, and an afterword by Richard Grove of Tragedy & Hope media. The edition was edited by David James Rodriguez.

== Reception ==
Layla Abdel Rahim included the book on her reading list regarding education and pedagogy. She described the book as, "an extremely important critique of culture and pedagogy."
