= John Taylor Gatto =

American author and school teacher (1935–2018)

- Gatto in 2009
- Born: December 15, 1935; Monongahela, Pennsylvania, US
- Died: October 25, 2018 (aged 82); New York City, US
- Other name: John Gatto
- Education: Cornell University; University of Pittsburgh; Yeshiva University; Hunter College; Reed College; University of California, Berkeley
- Occupations: Author; Speaker; Teacher
- Known for: Educational activist; Scholar; New York State Teacher of the Year
- Spouse: Janet Gatto

John Taylor Gatto (December 15, 1935 – October 25, 2018) was an American author, school teacher and public figure. After teaching for nearly 30 years he authored several books on American schools. He is best known for his books Dumbing Us Down: the Hidden Curriculum of Compulsory Schooling, and The Underground History of American Education: A Schoolteacher’s Intimate Investigation Into the Problem of Modern Schooling which promote self-study, unschooling and homeschooling.

== Biography ==
Gatto was born to Andrew Michael Mario and Frances Virginia (née Zimmer) Gatto in Monongahela, Pennsylvania, a steel town near Pittsburgh. In his youth he attended public schools throughout the Pittsburgh Metro Area including Swissvale, Monongahela, and Uniontown as well as a Catholic boarding school in Latrobe. He attended numerous undergraduate and graduate institutions.

According to Gatto, he started working as a copywriter scripting commercials in New York City in the late 1950s. In the spring of 1960, he borrowed his roommate's teaching license, went into Harlem to work as a substitute teacher and earned his teaching certificate in 1960. In 1963, he was hired as a full-time 8th grade English teacher at Intermediate School 44 on New York City's Upper West Side. Gatto moved on to Lincoln Academy (now Horizons Middle School) in 1981, which he described as a "dumping ground" for kids with behavior problems. Gatto ended his teaching career at Booker T. Washington Junior High in Spanish Harlem.

Gatto also ran for the New York State Senate, 29th District in 1985 and 1988 as a member of the Conservative Party of New York against incumbent David Paterson. He was named New York City Teacher of the Year in 1989, 1990, and 1991 and New York State Teacher of the Year in 1991. In 1991, he wrote a letter announcing his retirement, titled I Quit, I Think, to the op-ed pages of the Wall Street Journal, saying that he no longer wished to "hurt kids to make a living." He then began a public speaking and writing career, and has received awards from libertarian organizations, including the Alexis de Tocqueville 1997 Award for Excellence in Advancement of Educational Freedom.

Gatto promoted homeschooling, and specifically unschooling and open source learning.

Gatto was featured in the 2011 Evangelical Christian film IndoctriNation: Public Schools and the Decline of Christianity in America. The Ultimate History Lesson: A Weekend with John Taylor Gatto was released in early 2012 by Tragedy and Hope Communications.

== Personal life ==
Gatto was married to Janet (MacAdam) with whom he spent half the year in New York City and the other half of the year at their farmhouse in upstate New York.

== Main thesis ==
Gatto asserts the following regarding what school does to children in Dumbing Us Down:

1. It confuses the students. It presents an incoherent ensemble of information that the child needs to memorize to stay in school. Apart from the tests and trials, this programming is similar to the television; it fills almost all the "free" time of children. One sees and hears something, only to forget it again.
2. It teaches them to accept their class affiliation.
3. It makes them indifferent.
4. It makes them emotionally dependent.
5. It makes them intellectually dependent.
6. It teaches them a kind of self-confidence that requires constant confirmation by experts (provisional self-esteem).
7. It makes it clear to them that they cannot hide, because they are always supervised.

Gatto drew a contrast between communities and "networks", with the former being healthy, and schools being examples of the latter. He says networks have become an unhealthy substitute for community in the United States.

== Use of sources ==
Education historian Milton Gaither described Gatto's approach to sources as making an argument from authority. A qualitative review of his writing on compulsory education determined it didn't accurately reflect the policy or historical evidence.

In his essay Against School, Gatto argued that the apparent confusion and inefficiency of public schooling reflected its underlying social functions. He cited the six functions of schooling described by Alexander Inglis in his 1918 book Principles of Secondary Education, although Gatto did not quote Inglis directly and instead presented his own interpretation of Inglis's argument.

Gatto's books contain citations but generally lack organized bibliographies. Some of his historical claims and quotations have subsequently been challenged by researchers. In 2025, Hazard Spence completed the Indiegogo-funded project openhistory.education, which attempted to trace claims and quotations in Gatto's The Underground History of American Education to their original sources. Spence reported several instances in which he could not identify Gatto's source, or found that quotations had been misattributed or altered in presentation.

== Selected bibliography ==
=== Articles and essays ===
- "Against School." Harper’s Magazine (September 2003), pp. 33–38. "How public education cripples our kids, and why."
- A Short, Angry History of compulsory Schooling by John Taylor Gatto

=== Books ===
- Ken Kesey's One Flew Over the Cuckoo's Nest: A Critical Commentary. New York: Monarch Press (1975). ISBN 978-0671009663. OCLC 5687233.
- Dumbing Us Down: The Hidden Curriculum of Compulsory Schooling. Philadelphia: New Society Publishers (1992). Foreword by Thomas Moore. ISBN 0865714487. OCLC 926842308.
- The Exhausted School: The First National Grassroots Speakout on the Right to School Choice: Carnegie Hall, New York City. New York: Oxford Village Press (1993). Preface by Patrick Farenga. ISBN 978-0945700029. OCLC 1010741721.
- A Different Kind of Teacher: Solving the Crisis of American Schooling. Berkeley, Calif.: Berkeley Hills Books (2002). ISBN 978-1893163218. OCLC 1043481859.
- The Underground History of American Education. New York: Oxford Village Press (2001). ISBN 978-0945700043. OCLC 45004688.
  - Revised edition (2017) by Oxford Scholars Press (New York) features a foreword is by U.S. Congressman Ron Paul, an introduction by David Ruenzel, and an afterword by Richard Grove of Tragedy and Hope Media.
- Weapons of Mass Instruction: A Schoolteacher's Journey Through the Dark World of Compulsory Schooling. Gabriola Island, B.C. (Canada): New Society Publishers (2009). ISBN 978-0865716315. OCLC 1073186340.
- The Adventures of Snider, the CIA Spider, by John Taylor Gatto (2017) Lost Tools Press. Illustrated by Anne Yvonne Gilbert. ISBN 978-0989280037.

== Filmography ==
=== Documentaries ===
- Human Resources (2010)
- IndoctriNation: Public Schools and the Decline of Christianity (2011)
- Thrive: What on Earth Will It Take? (2011)
- The Ultimate History Lesson: A Weekend with John Taylor Gatto (2012)
  - Sourced transcript.
  - Bibliography and references.

== See also ==
- Critical pedagogy
- Deschooling Society (book by Ivan Illich)
- Hidden curriculum
- How Children Fail (book by John Holt)
- Total institution

Other critics of public education:

- Zachariah Montgomery
- Richard Grant White
- Charlotte Thomson Iserbyt
