= Francis Parker School (San Diego) =

Prep school in San Diego, California, US

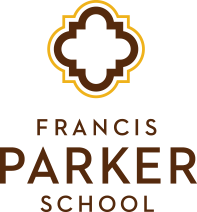

Location
- 6501 Linda Vista Road; San Diego, California; United States; 32.7719°N 117.1769°W

Information
- Other name: Parker
- Type: Private Non-Sectarian
- Motto: “As far as the mind can see”
- Established: 1912
- Founder: Clara Sturges Johnson and William Templeton Johnson
- Head of school: Kevin Yaley
- Grades: JK–12
- Enrollment: 1,237
- Colors: Brown and gold (Teal is also added on 2012)
- Mascot: Lancers
- Rivals: The Bishops School, La Jolla Country Day School, Pacific Ridge School
- Newspaper: The Scribe
- Website: http://www.francisparker.org

Francis Parker School, also known simply as Parker, is a college preparatory independent day school in San Diego, California, serving students from junior kindergarten through twelfth grade. Parker was founded in 1912 by Clara Sturges Johnson and William Templeton Johnson, themselves recent arrivals to the West Coast. The Johnsons' nieces had attended the original Francis W. Parker School in Chicago, founded eleven years earlier, and sought to recreate the same progressive education standards at the original institution.

While the institutions are both named after Colonel Parker, the schools themselves differ in their day-to-day operation as well as the structure of institutions such as the student government.

The original Parker campus was established in 1912 at its current location in Mission Hills; a second campus, containing a middle and upper school, was established subsequently in Linda Vista.

== History ==
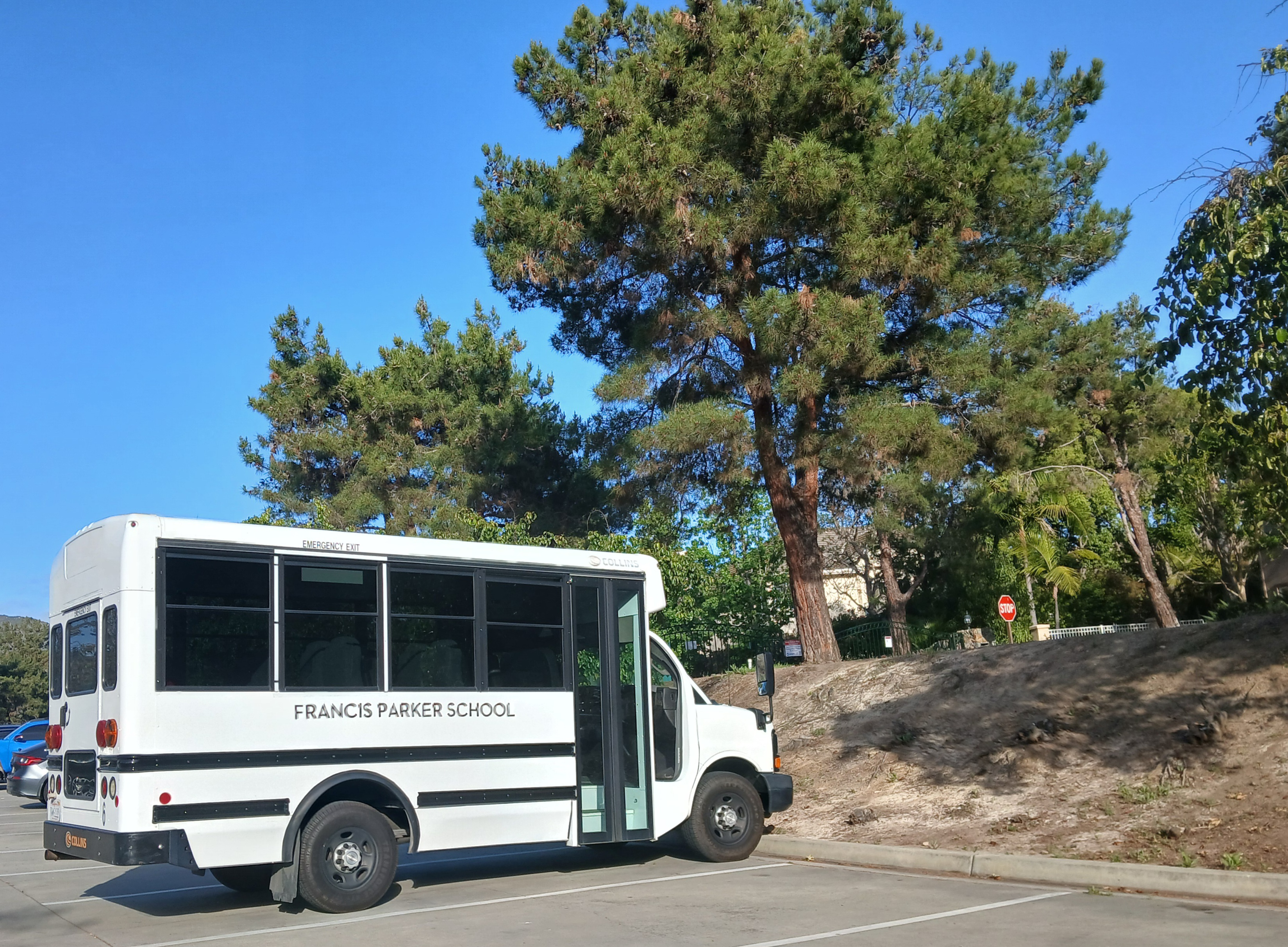
Bus in the parking lot at Steele Canyon Golf Club.

During its founding in 1912, Francis Parker School was heavily influenced in both name and educational philosophy by the work of Colonel Francis Wayland Parker, a teacher, school administrator, civil war veteran, and pioneer of progressive education in the United States. Born in New Hampshire the mid 19th century, Colonel Parker was influenced by pedagogical views of many philosophers of the Enlightenment, particularly those of Johann Friedrich Herbart. Much of his educational values and approaches are demonstrated through his development of the Quincy Method, which de-emphasized rigid discipline and memorization, instead focusing on critical thinking, collaboration, and holistic development of students. In 1901, the Francis W. Parker School was founded in Chicago under Parker's liberal educational views. He died in 1902, but the school served as a model for the Francis W. Parker School in San Diego.

William Templeton Johnson, an architect originally from New York, and his wife Clara Sturges Johnson moved to San Diego in 1912 after the architect's education at the Ecole des Beaux-Arts in Paris. The couple founded Francis Parker School in San Diego in 1912. The original campus opened in December in a Mission Hills bungalow with an enrollment of 3 students, two of the Johnsons’ sons and one other child. Originally located on what's now the Mission Hills Nursery on Fort Stockton Drive, the school subsequently moved less than a year later to its present location on nearby Randolph Street. William Johnson planned the Mission Hills campus; it was designed in a Spanish Mission style, and the central quadrangle and open-air classrooms attempted to foster a collaborative physical environment that would serve the aims of the school's educational philosophy The school curriculum was modeled after the original Francis Parker School in Chicago, where the Johnsons’ nieces had attended.

By the early 1960s, Parker still existed only as a K-9 school. By the end of the decade, however, the school expanded to include 10-12th grades, and the entire K–12 student population of around 500 was packed into the five-acre Mission Hills campus. The need for additional space drove headmaster Dr. Doug Crone to search for land on which to establish a separate campus for grades 6–12. In 1971, Parker purchased its current 43-acre Linda Vista campus from The San Miguel School for Boys, which was moving to La Jolla to merge with the Bishop's School for Girls, what is now the Bishop's School. Today, the Mission Hills campus is home to the Lower School, with classes from Junior Kindergarten to Grade 5. The Linda Vista Campus is home to the Middle School, Grades 6 to 8, and Upper School, Grades 9 to 12.

== Academics ==
Francis Parker had an admission rate for the Upper School of under 25% for matriculation into the 2013–14 school year. Parker's main academic and athletic rivals are The Bishop's School, La Jolla Country Day School, and Pacific Ridge School.

In 2008, Francis Parker was recognized in The Wall Street Journal for being a top prep school that sends its students to prestigious colleges and in 2011, CBS Moneywatch named it one of the best Ivy League feeder schools on the West Coast.

== Sexual abuse controversy ==
In September 2021, a lawsuit was filed on behalf of former student Grace Winn claiming that three school administrators failed to report sexual abuse by a former teacher. According to the suit, Winn's history teacher and basketball coach Miguel Cembrano groomed and then sexually abused her from 2014 to 2016, beginning when she was 13 years old. The suit claims that Cembrano was fired by the school in 2015 for alleged inappropriate conduct with a student. Neither Child protective services nor the parents were notified. After his firing, Cembrano went on to teach at High Tech High, where he continued to solicit and obtain naked photographs from Winn via Snapchat. In 2016, under threat of investigation, Cembrano committed suicide by jumping off the Coronado Bridge. Defendants Kevin Yaley, Dan Lang, and Christi Cole—all current administrators at the school—are awaiting trial.

A new lawsuit has alleged that Dan Lang, the current head of middle school, sexually abused a student in 2013. This student has since died.

== Notable alumni ==
- John Cook (1975), former head coach of the Nebraska Cornhuskers women's volleyball team
- Nick Allen (2017), MLB shortstop/second baseman, Olympian (2020)
- Peter Bowden (2019), NFL long snapper
- Kate Morgan Chadwick (2001), actress, singer
- Eldar Djangirov (2005), Grammy-nominated pianist, composer
- Kyle Dowdy (2011), former MLB pitcher
- Theodore E. Gildred (1950), former United States Ambassador to Argentina, businessman
- Cassidy Lichtman (2007), USA Volleyball National Team member (2011–2016)
- Nackey Loeb (née Scripps) (1942), newspaper publisher (Manchester Union Leader)
- Garrett Muagututia (2006), USA Volleyball National Team member (2011–present), Olympian (2020, 2024)
- Nick Noonan (2007), former MLB infielder
- Matt Wile (2011), former NFL punter
- Pat Harrigan (2005), American politician, U.S. representative for North Carolina's 10th congressional district
- Arden Pala (2025), American philanthropist
- Billy Evans, American businessman and partner of Elizabeth Holmes, featured in the 2026 documentary You Can See Everything

== See also ==
- Primary and secondary schools in San Diego, California
