= Flora Juliette Cooke =

American progressive educator (1864–1953)

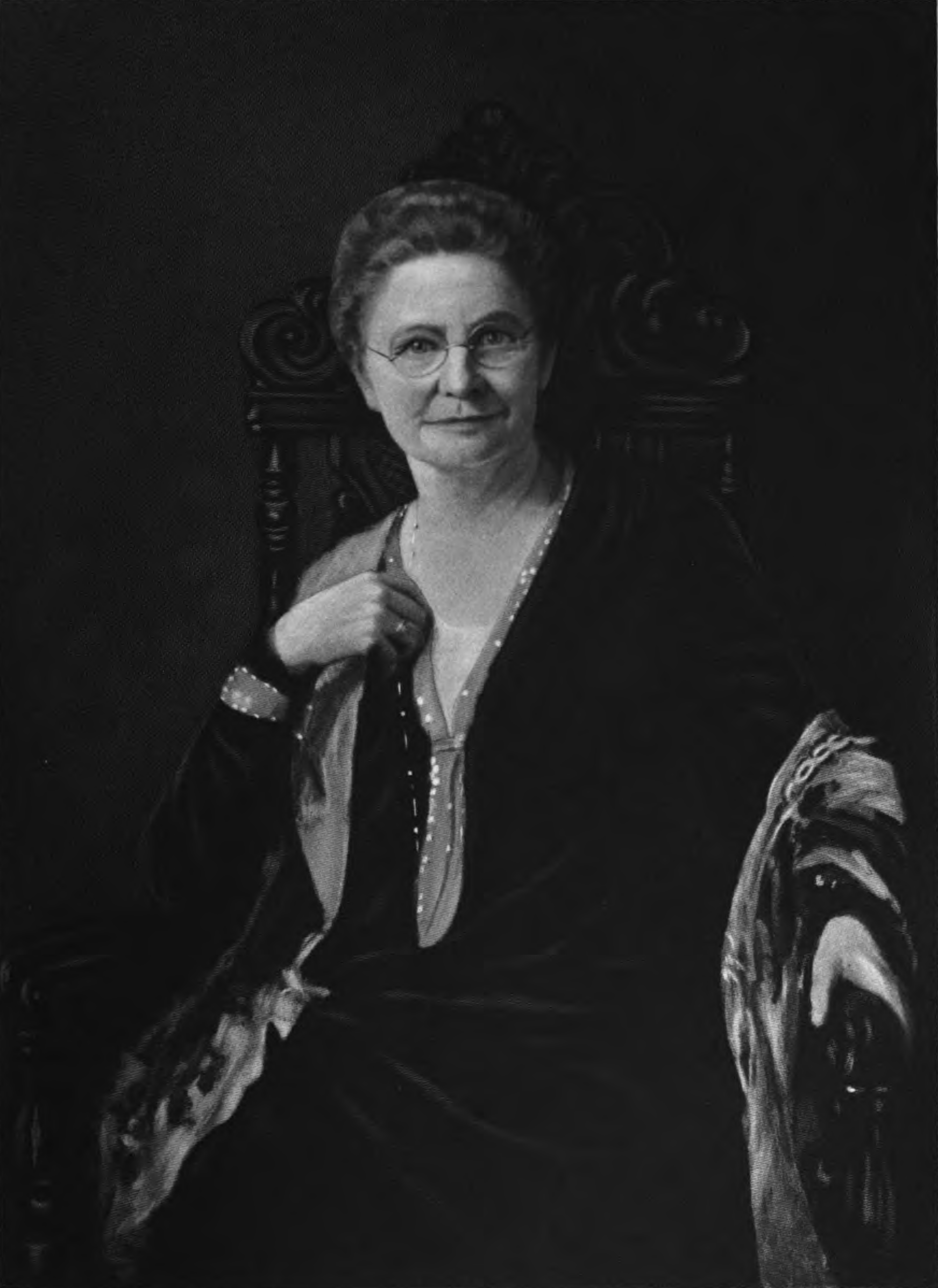
- Flora Cooke in 1938
- Born: December 25, 1864; Bainbridge, Ohio, US
- Died: February 21, 1953 (aged 88); Chicago, Illinois, US
- Occupation: Educator
- Known for: Principal of the Francis W. Parker School, pioneer of progressive education

Flora Juliette Cooke (December 25, 1864 – February 21, 1953) was an American educator who played a prominent role in the progressive education movement of the early 20th century. As the long-serving principal of the Francis W. Parker School in Chicago, Cooke was instrumental in developing and disseminating the principles of progressive education, which emphasized child-centered learning, hands-on activities, and the integration of the curriculum. She's considered a significant figure in the field of educational reform during this period, due to her innovative approaches to teaching and her commitment to inclusive, democratic education.

== Biography ==
=== Early life and education ===
Flora Juliette Cooke was born on December 25, 1864, in Bainbridge, Ohio. When she was five years old, her mother died, and she was sent to live with her mother's close friends, Charles and Luella (Miller) Cooke, who legally adopted her in 1881. Cooke attended public schools in Youngstown, Ohio, and after graduating from high school in 1884, she taught school in Ohio for five years.

=== Career ===
==== Innovative teaching practices ====
In 1885, Cooke was assigned to teach 125 first-grade students at the Hellman Street School in Youngstown. To keep some children occupied while directly instructing others, she created various activities and games. The school's principal, Zonia Baber, a recent graduate of the Cook County Normal School in Chicago, not only approved of Cooke's approach but also provided helpful suggestions. Baber later persuaded Colonel Francis Parker, a prominent figure in the progressive education movement, to invite Cooke to study at the Normal School, where she found herself aligned with Parker's educational philosophies.

==== The Francis W. Parker School ====
In 1899, Cooke moved with Parker to the Chicago Institute, and in 1901, she became the principal of the newly established Francis W. Parker School, a position she held for the next thirty-three years. Under her leadership, the school became known for its implementation of progressive education principles. Cooke believed that teachers should have the freedom to collaborate and take responsibility for the direction of their teaching, and the teachers at the Parker School produced curriculum materials and guides for practice, many of which Cooke edited and published.

Cooke's approach to the Parker School emphasized serving students from diverse economic backgrounds. With the support of philanthropist Anita McCormick Blaine, the school provided scholarships for children whose parents could not afford the tuition. Cooke also focused on reading instruction, encouraging children to talk and write about their experiences and producing illustrated leaflets to be used in place of standard readers.

==== Extending principles to high school ====
Cooke was committed to extending progressive education principles to the development of adolescent students. She was concerned that the rigid entrance requirements of most colleges controlled high school curricula and failed to account for the artistic, social, and moral qualities promoted by the Parker School and similar institutions. In 1932, the school participated in the Eight-Year Study of High Schools sponsored by the Commission on the Relation of School and College of the Progressive Education Association.

=== Later life and legacy ===
After her retirement in 1934, Cooke continued to serve on the board of trustees of the Parker School and remained involved in various organizations. She was instrumental in the founding of the North Shore Country Day School, which was modeled on the Parker School, and Roosevelt University, which was dedicated to providing university education for Chicago students who could not afford to attend more expensive institutions. Toward the end of her career, the 80-year-old Flora Juliette Cooke remained an active advocate for progressive ideals.

Cooke died in 1953 at her home in Chicago, having never married.

== Bibliography ==
- Green, Nancy S. (February 2000). "Cooke, Flora Juliette (1864-1953), progressive educator". American National Biography. New York: Oxford University Press. doi:10.1093/anb/9780198606697.article.0900195. (subscription required)
