= H. C. Westermann =

American sculptor (1922-1981)

- Born: Horace Clifford Westermann; December 11, 1922; Los Angeles, California, U.S.
- Died: November 3, 1981 (aged 58); Danbury, Connecticut, U.S.
- Education: School of the Art Institute of Chicago (BFA)

Horace Clifford Westermann (December 11, 1922 – November 3, 1981) was an American sculptor and printmaker. His sculptures frequently incorporate traditional carpentry, marquetry techniques, mixed media, and a range of personal, literary, artistic, and pop-cultural references.

Westermann's craftsmanship and uncanny, sometimes humorous presentation has led critics to compare his work to that of Surrealist-inspired artists such as Joseph Cornell, as well as Assemblage, Dada and Folk art.

== Biography ==
Nouveau Rat Trap by H. C. Westermann, 1965, birch plywood, rosewood, metal, rubber bumpers, Honolulu Museum of Art

Horace Clifford (H.C.) Westermann was born in Los Angeles, California in December 1922. His father of the same name was an accountant. From an early age H.C. Westermann demonstrated a natural talent and aptitude for the arts, specifically sculpting. He designed and ultimately created his personal scooters and toys, eventually contributing a small addition to his parents’ home.

After graduating from high school, Westermann briefly enrolled in Los Angeles City College and later took a job in the Pacific Northwest as a rail worker in logging camps. At the start of American involvement in World War II, he enlisted in the US Marine Corps at age 20 and was stationed aboard the USS Enterprise as an anti-aircraft gunner. In a letter to a friend, Westermann describes a situation he experienced wherein he was strapped into an anti-aircraft gun emplacement on the ship's stern when they came under attack by Japanese aircraft. A kamikaze pilot streaked towards the ship, prompting Westermann to fire upon and deflect the aircraft into the front of his ship where exploded the bow as he was strapped to the stern. Westermann also witnessed the destruction of the USS Franklin involving the loss of 800 men. He would later reflect on the experience of witnessing the USS Franklin's destruction, describing "the horrible smell of death."

Immediately following the end of the war, Westermann formed a two-man acrobatics act with the United Service Organization (USO) and toured the across Asia for a year. During the tour, Westermann met his first wife, June Laford, a showgirl performing in Shanghai. Together, Westermann and his new bride moved to Chicago and had a son, Gregory. Westermann then enrolled in The Art Institute of Chicago in 1947 to study Applied Art and took a job in the department to financially support his new family. Three years later, June divorced Westermann, after which he grew increasingly disillusioned with mainstream art.

Feeling bitter and fed up with the current state of American art and unhappy with his personal life, Westermann reenlisted in the US Marine Corps in 1950 as an infantryman in the Korean War. He entered the conflict still patriotic from his service in World War II, yet due to the military blunders and violence he witnessed, he left the conflict with a drastically different view of America's place in the world.

After he left the Marine Corps at the end of the war, Westermann enrolled in the School of the Art Institute of Chicago a second time under the G.I. Bill to study Fine Art. Although he lacked the experience of working as an artist that many of his younger peers held, Westermann was very well liked by his classmates and staff for his maturity and real world experiences. To complement his tuition from the G.I. Bill, he learned woodworking and began to take on work as a carpenter. He quickly established a reputation for quality work, yet his superiors urged him to value speed over craftsmanship, a conflict of values that led to him leaving carpentry for work to becoming a sculptor rather than a handyman. He continued his artistic work until his death on November 3, 1981.

== Style ==
Westermann never offered any subjective interpretation of his sculpture. When asked about the meaning of one of his works, he said, "It puzzles me, too." Westermann never identified with a single movement. According to curator Barbara Haskell, this led to Westermann's work being loosely associated with Expressionism and Surrealism – the two most prominent traditions in the art of postwar Chicago.

Westermann produced a wide array of works, from sculptures to lithographs, using materials ranging from paper and plywood to brass and lead. Despite Westermann's lack of commitment to one medium, his works reflect common themes shaped by his wartime experiences.

The brutal vision of the human condition seen in wartime stuck with Westermann and resulted in his anti-militaristic worldview that everyone is alone in a world run by events beyond anyone's control. The clearest depiction of this philosophy is seen in his "Death Ships" series, a multimedia collection depicting bombed-out husks of ships, usually set aflame, surrounded by shark fins. Westermann's later works retain this same theme of human helplessness, as they usually revolve around some scenario involving impending doom for the subject. Additionally, his son Gregory enlisted in the Marines during the Vietnam War, which Westermann strongly opposed. Seeing his son serve in the conflict strengthened his own anti-militaristic views.

Westermann's anti-consumerist views also influenced his work, including "Antimobile." Westermann criticized the growing lack of craftsmanship in modern industry and the rise of automation. He mentioned the "depersonalization of society by the machine" as a major influence of his artistic career.

A prominent attribute of Westermann's works is his excruciating level of precision and craftsmanship. Every piece of Westermann's sculptures is hand filed and finished, with the same attention to detail given to the inner, unseen components as the outer finish. Dovetailed corners and laminated wood is common in much of his work, although Westermann experimented with all manner of wood, metal, laminate, synthetic materials, and more.

In some of his sculptures and paintings, Westermann also relied on dry humor. For example his tongue-in-cheek work "Walnut Box-1964," a small wooden box constructed of walnut and filled with walnuts, differs from his usual more serious tone.

Many of Westermann's contemporaries held him and his works in high regard. For the most part, his work was well received by critics and the public alike.

== Works ==
- Untitled (in the manner of Salvador Dalí), around 1948
- Theatrical Worlds Spirit after Bernardino Jacobi, around 1949
- Reluctant Acrobat, 1949 (Honolulu Museum of Art)
- A Soldier's Dream (sculpture), 1955 (Honolulu Museum of Art)
- Dismasted Ship, 1956
- Ensor's Mother, 1956 (Smart Museum of Art)
- Untitled ("Unusual Physician"), 1957
- He Whore, 1957
- Memorial to the Idea of Man If He Was an Idea, 1958
- Mad House, 1958
- Burning House, 1958 (Smart Museum of Art)
- Battle of Little Big Horn, 1959
- Angry Young Machine, 1959
- Destructive Machine from Under the Sea, 1959
- Hard of Hearing Object (sculpture), 1961 (Honolulu Museum of Art)
- Disasters in the Sky #2, 1962
- Machine for Calculating Risk, 1962
- Clean Air, 1964
- Walnut Box, 1964
- Antimobile, 1965
- Korean KAI ASH, 1965
- Death Ship of No Port, 1967
- Green Planet (Green Planet π), 1967
- Woman from Indianapolis (Columbia, Missouri), 1967
- See America First – a series, 1968
- Untitled (This Great Rock was Buried Once for a Million Years) (sculpture), 1968 (Honolulu Museum of Art)
- Hammer in Box, 1970
- An Affair in the Islands (watercolor), 1972 (Honolulu Museum of Art)
- U.F.O. Landing in Africa (sculpture), 1974 (Honolulu Museum of Art)
- The Connecticut Ballroom, 1975–76
- H.C.W. (Poster Project) (watercolor), 1977 (Honolulu Museum of Art)
- Escape Down the Still River (watercolor), 1979 (Honolulu Museum of Art)
- Woman Descending into Paradise (watercolor), 1979 (Honolulu Museum of Art)
- They Couldn't Put "Humpty Dumpty" Back Together Again (sculpture), 1980 (Honolulu Museum of Art)
- Jack of Diamonds, 1981

== Impact ==
Westermann was subject to his first major museum retrospective in November 1968 at LACMA; an expanded version of which traveled to the Museum of Contemporary Art Chicago.

Westermann had a second major museum retrospective in May 1978 at the Whitney Museum, eventually touring to SFMOMA, the Seattle Art Museum. Des Moines Art Center, and the New Orleans Museum of Art.

Westermann was the subject of a third major museum retrospective in June 2001 at the Museum of Contemporary Art Chicago, traveling to the Hirshhorn Museum and Sculpture Garden, Museum of Contemporary Art, Los Angeles, and the Menil Collection.

Westermann was the subject of a major retrospective (1955–1981) at the Fondazione Prada in Milan from October 20, 2017 to January 15, 2018

A 3D documentary film entitled Westermann: Memorial to the Idea of Man If He Was an Idea directed by Leslie Buchbinder was released by Pentimenti Productions in 2023. The title of the film refers to Westermann's 1958 sculpture and a script culled from Westermann's letters was voiced by Ed Harris.The film features interviews with Ed Ruscha, Frank Gehry, and Martha Westermann Renner, the artist's sister.
