= Progressive Education Association =

American organization dedicated to progressive education, 1919–1955

The Progressive Education Association was a group dedicated to the spread of progressive education in American public schools from 1919 to 1955. The group focused on pedagogy in elementary schools through the twenties. The group turned towards public schools and sociopolitical issues in the early 1930s, and launched three commissions into progressive school topics. The Eight-Year Study tested how American progressive secondary schools would prepare their students for college when released from the curricular restrictions of college admissions requirements. The other two commissions addressed curriculum towards the needs of democracy and students, and teaching materials to serve children's psychological needs. After a peak of activity in the late 1930s, the group struggled to regain its position of thought leadership and reconcile the competing interests within the group. It collapsed in the mid-1950s amidst rising anti-progressive education sentiment in cultural trends including political conservatism and anti-intellectualism, school standardization, and emphasis on vocational education.

== Origins ==
The Association for the Advancement of Progressive Education was founded in early 1919 by a group of wealthy Washington women and staff from private and public schools to bring progressive education to public schools across the United States. Led by Stanwood Cobb, attendees of the first meeting included Marietta Johnson (Fairhope School) and affiliates of the Lincoln School of Teachers College, the Park School of Baltimore, and the Washington Montessori School. The next year, the group adopted seven guiding tenets to drive growth and focus their organization, known as the Seven Principles of Progressive Education:

1. Freedom for children to develop naturally
2. Interest as the motive of all work
3. Teacher as guide, not taskmaster
4. Change school recordkeeping to promote the scientific study of student development
5. More attention to all that affects student physical development
6. School and home cooperation to meet the child's natural interests and activities
7. Progressive school as thought leader in educational movements

Elementary education was the group's initial focus, with common interest in the project method and child-centered education. Their conferences and discussions were based on themes of freedom and creative opportunity. Headmasters of small, private, high social class schools guided the organization through the twenties. Former Harvard president Charles W. Eliot served as its first honorary president, a title the philosopher John Dewey would later hold. Towards the decade's end, public school administrators and education academics associated with Teachers College replaced the headmasters as the organization turned to public schools. Likewise, the group traded its focus on pedagogy for focus on social and political issues, as embodied in George Counts's 1932 address, "Dare Progressive Education Be Progressive?" This grew the Association and membership quadrupled between 1924 and 1930 to 7,600 members. The organization's activity peaked in the late 1930s, as membership reached 10,000. In 1931, the group became known as the Progressive Education Association.

== Activities ==
The Association initiated three commissions with lasting impact on American education scholarship. The Commission on the Relation of School and College (1930–1942) issued a five-volume assessment of its Eight-Year Study, which reported that students who attended thirty progressive, secondary schools with experimental curriculum had fared as well in college as their peers from traditional preparatory secondary schools. The Commission on the Secondary School Curriculum (1933–1940) addressed how curriculum could meet democratic ideals and student needs. The Commission on Human Relations (1935–1942) reported on teaching materials to serve children's psychological needs in six volumes. The effects of these commissions were dulled by cultural factors.

The Progressive Education Association additionally supported two publications: the quarterly journal Progressive Education (1924–1957) and The Social Frontier (1934–1943, renamed Frontiers of Democracy in 1939). The latter publication was for a time edited by George Albert Coe.

After World War II, leaders of the progressive education movement were less involved in the Association. The group renamed as the American Education Fellowship in 1947, which was meant to reflect their expanded purpose and international reach. They could not, however, reconcile the opposed factions of their membership: those who either sought radical social change or practical school reform. Six years later, in 1953, they returned to the Progressive Education Association name for the organization's last two years. The John Dewey Society supported the Association during this time.

The Association's cause for decline remains disputed. In 1955, the organization shuttered amidst a surge of criticism towards progressive education, in cultural trends including rising conservatism and anti-intellectualism in the political sphere and emphasis on vocational education and standardization in the schools as Progressive Education Association membership shriveled below 1,000. The Association has no archives.
