= Orsch =

Coordinates: 38.54608°N 106.9298°W

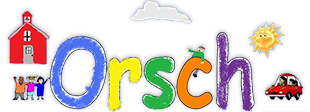
- Gunnison, Colorado; United States

Information
- Type: Private School
- Established: 2009
- Founder: Jackie and Ashley Burt
- Grades: Kindergarten to 12th Grade (K-12)
- Enrollment: 78
- Website: orsch.net

One Room Schoolhouse (simply known as Orsch) is an American progressive private school, based in Gunnison, Colorado, United States. The school was founded in 2009 for students from kindergarten to twelfth grade (K-12). Orsch was founded by Jackie Burt and Ashley Burt from a summer program and has grown to 78 students as of 2013.

== Philosophy ==
According to its founder the school is "an educational lab dedicated to finding and implementing practices that work best for all students. Students represent a diverse population; educational opportunities should mirror and honor that diversity." The school aims to create engaged learning through encouraging independence and flexibility, creativity, and variety in programming, as well as a foundation of community and security.

The founder says they don't have grade levels. They have skill levels in their school. The school has a "No Homework Policy." The founder strives to keep academics in the classroom. She wants kids to learn other kinds of lessons and experience life outside of school.

== Proposal for Orsch to become a charter school ==
In February 2013 the founders of Orsch, Jackie and Ashley Burt, met with the RE1J School Board to discuss the possibility of turning Orsch from a private into a charter school. After discussions, it was decided that becoming a charter school was not a good fit for Orsch. For Orsch it reduced the school's freedom to teach using methods it deemed best and some RE1J School Board members had concerns about how the Orsch system would fit with the district school system.
