= History of education in Massachusetts =

The history of education in Massachusetts covers all levels of schooling in Massachusetts from colonial times to the present. It also includes the political and intellectual history of educational policies. The state was a national leader in pedagogical techniques and ideas, and in developing public schools as well as private schools and colleges.

== Colonial ==
The first public schools in America were established by the Puritans in New England during the 17th century. Boston Latin School was founded in 1635. Boston Latin School was not funded by tax dollars in its early days, however. On January 1, 1644, by unanimous vote, Dedham authorized the first U.S. taxpayer-funded public school; "the seed of American education."

Lawrence Cremin writes that colonists tried at first to educate by the traditional English methods of family, church, community, and apprenticeship, with schools later becoming the key agent in "socialization". At first, the rudiments of literacy and arithmetic were taught inside the family. By the mid-19th century, the role of the schools had expanded to such an extent that many of the educational tasks traditionally handled by parents became the responsibility of the schools.

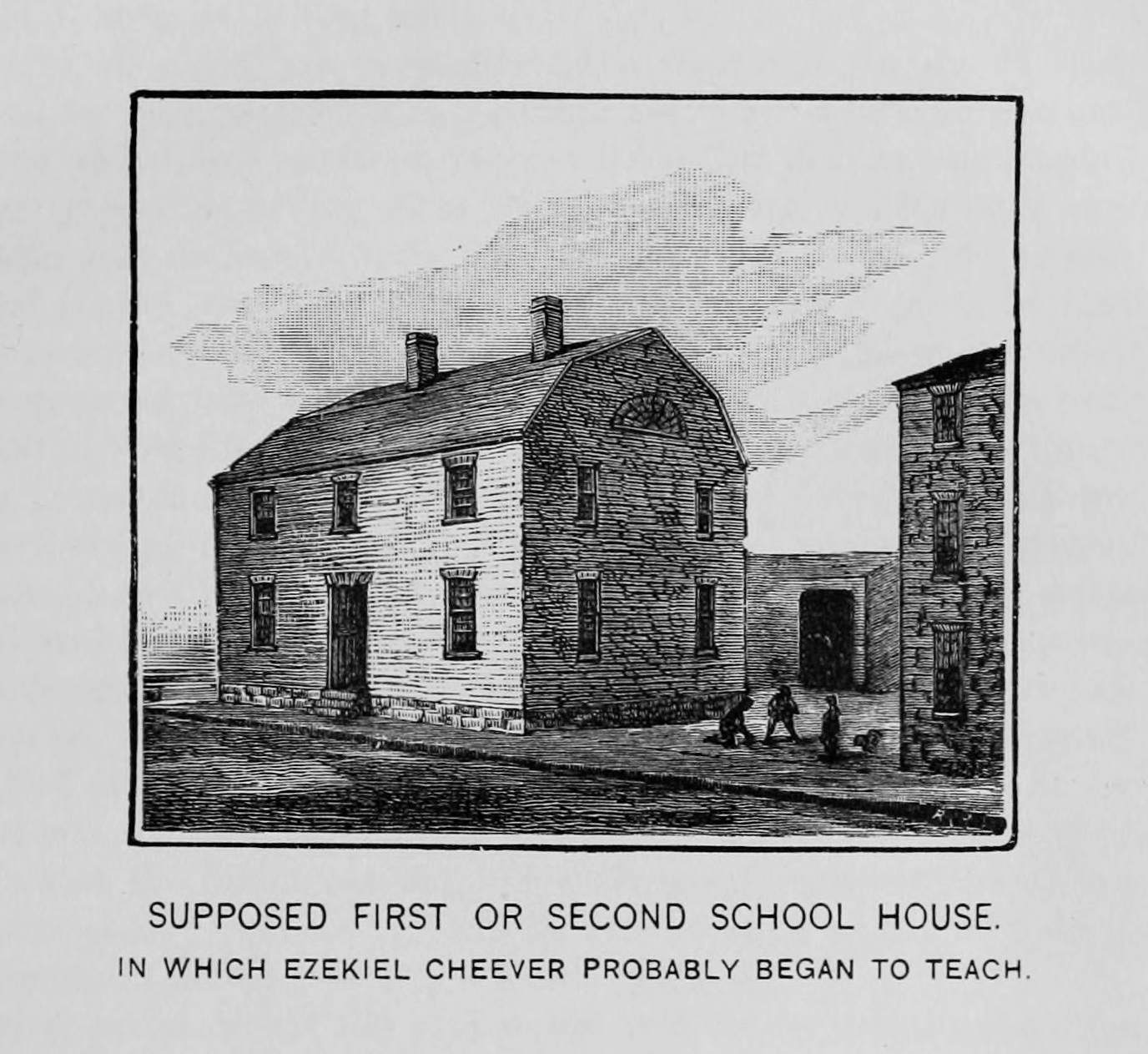
First Boston Latin School house

All the New England colonies required towns to set up schools. The Mayflower Pilgrims made a law in Plymouth Colony that each family was responsible to teach their children how to read and write, for the express purpose of reading the Bible. In 1642, the Massachusetts Bay Colony made education compulsory, and other New England colonies followed. Similar statutes were adopted in other colonies in the 1640s and 1650s. The schools were all male, with few facilities for girls. Common schools appeared in the 18th century, where students of all ages were under the control of one teacher in one room. They were publicly supplied at the local town level; they were not free but were supported by tuition or rate bills.

The larger towns in New England opened grammar schools, the forerunner of the modern high school. The most famous was the Boston Latin School, which is still in operation as a public high school. Hopkins School in New Haven, Connecticut was another. By the 1780s, most had been replaced by private academies. By the early 19th century, New England operated a network of elite private high schools (now called "prep schools") typified by Phillips Andover Academy (1778), Phillips Exeter Academy (1781), and Deerfield Academy (1797). They became coeducational in the 1970s and remain highly prestigious in the 21st century.

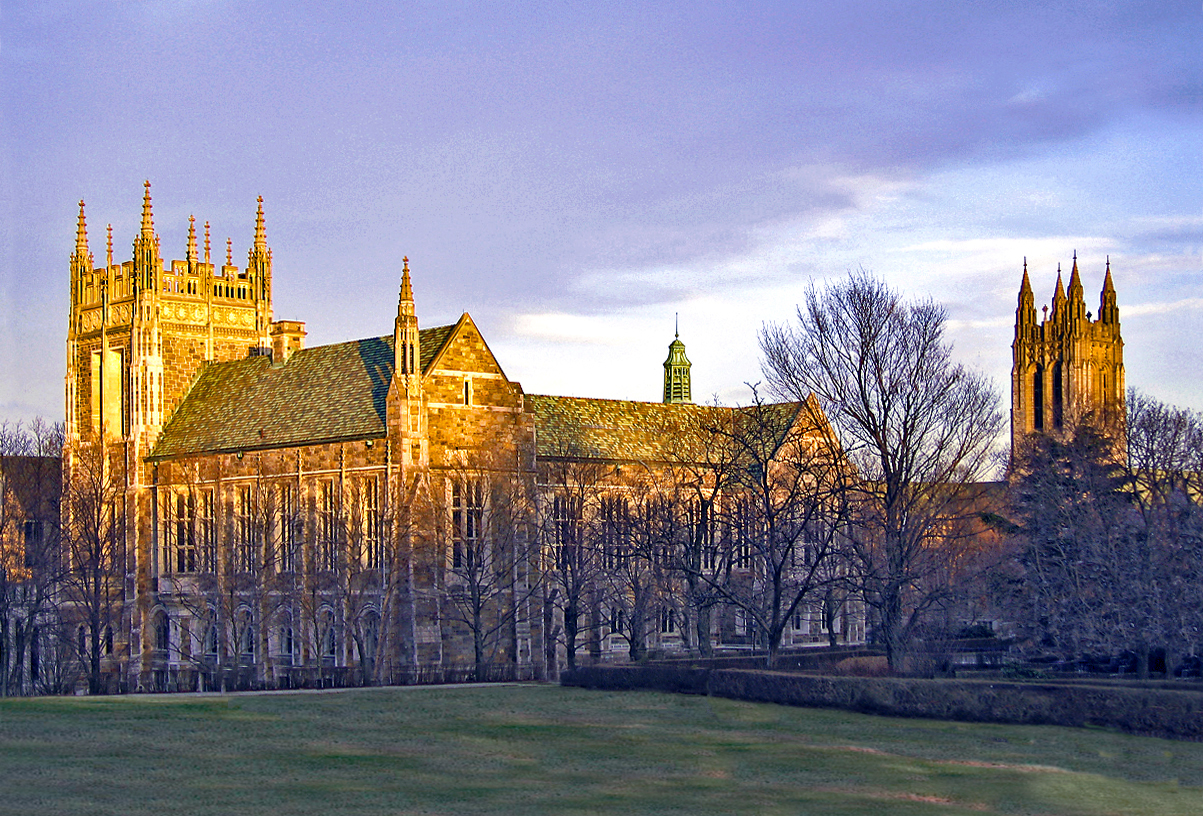
Colleges and churches were often copied from European architecture; Boston College was originally dubbed Oxford in America.

Puritan Massachusetts placed a high priority on the ability of everyone to read the Bible. It established local schools in 1647. Every town was to "appoint one within their town to teach all such children as shall resort to him to write and read." The teacher's wages were usually paid by the town. Larger towns had to set up a grammar school that would enable graduates to attend Harvard College. Watertown paid its teacher £30 a year.

=== Harvard College ===
Religious denominations established most early colleges in order to train ministers. They were modeled after Oxford and Cambridge universities in England, as well as Scottish universities. Harvard College was founded by the Massachusetts Bay colonial legislature in 1636, and was named after an early benefactor. Most of the funding came from the colony, but the colleges began to collect endowments early on. Harvard first focused on training young men for the ministry, and won general support from the well educated Puritan government, some of whose leaders had attended either Oxford or Cambridge.

Puritanism required a well educated ministry, and Harvard and Yale (founded in 1701) provided the men, Of the 2,466 graduates of the two schools from 1691 to 1760, 987 (40%) became ministers. However the salaries were low and increasingly ministers were unable to send their own sons to college.

=== First public school ===
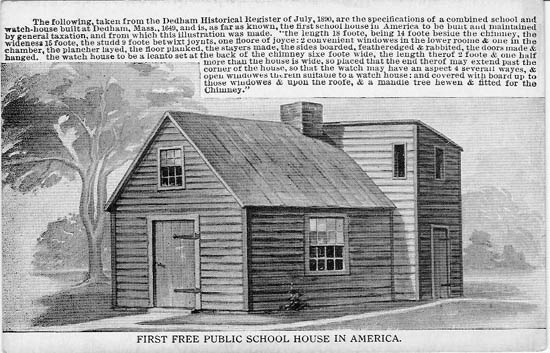
The first taxpayer-funded public school in the United States was in Dedham.

On January 1, 1644, by unanimous vote, Dedham authorized the first taxpayer-funded public school; "the seed of American education." Its first teacher, Rev. Ralph Wheelock, was paid 20 pounds annually to instruct the youth of the community. Descendants of these students would become presidents of Dartmouth, Yale and Harvard. Another early teacher, Michael Metcalf, was one of the town's first residents and a signer of the Dedham Covenant.

John Thurston was commission by the town to build the first schoolhouse in 1648 for which he received £11.0.3 . The details in the contract require him to construct floorboards, doors, and "fitting the interior with 'featheredged and rabbited' boarding" similar to that found in the Fairbanks House.

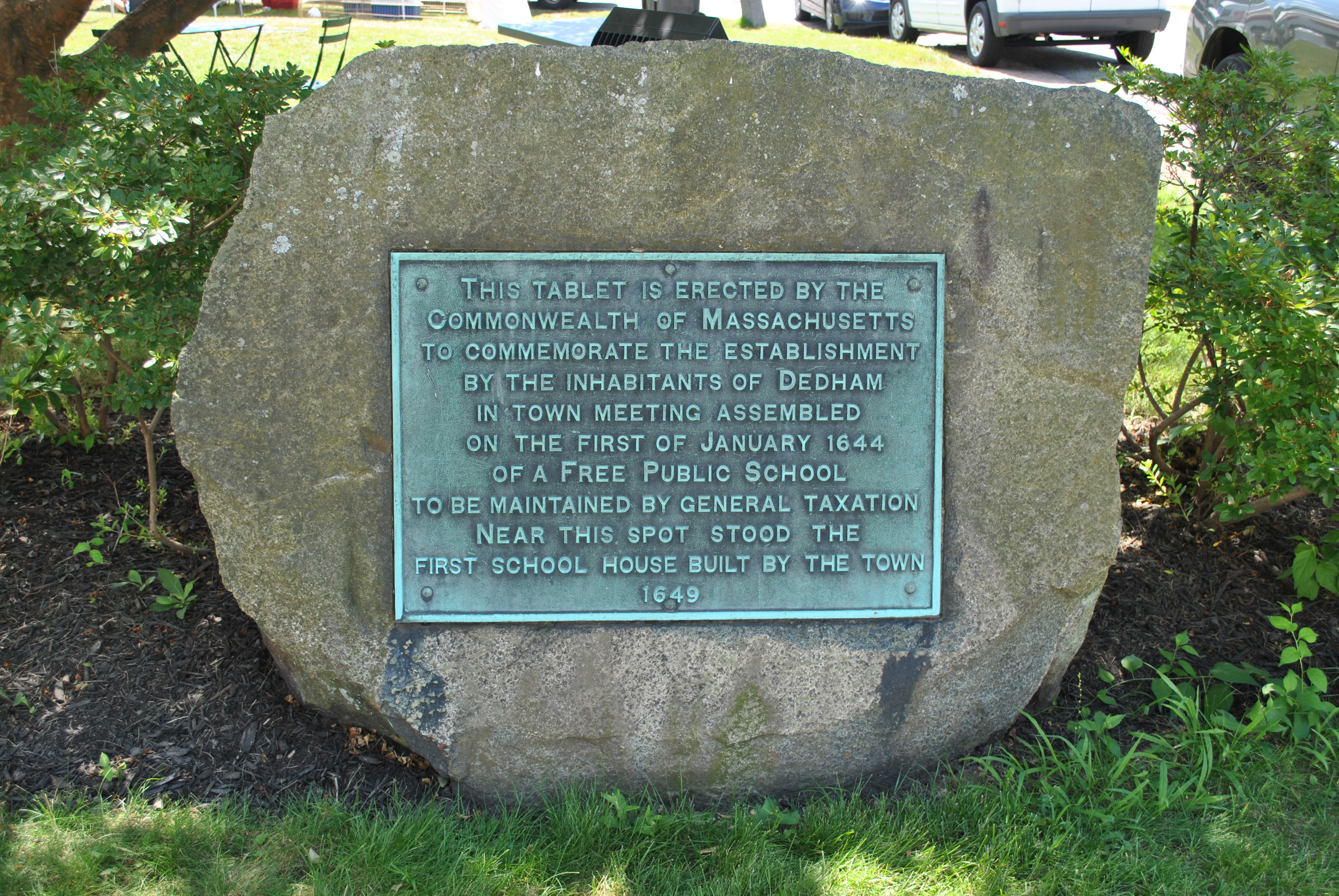
Stone plaque marking the site of the first public school in America. Located on First Church Green in Dedham, Massachusetts.

The early residents of Dedham were so committed to education that they donated £4.6.6 to Harvard College during its first eight years of existence, a sum greater than many other towns, including Cambridge itself. By the later part of the century, however, a sentiment of anti-intellectualism had pervaded the town. Residents were content to allow the minister to be the local intellectual and did not establish a grammar school as required by law. As a result, the town was called into court in 1675 and then again in 1691.

Other schools, including Boston Latin School and the Rehoboth Public Schools, have claimed to be the first public school, but Dedham's was the first to be supported exclusively by tax dollars. On June 17, 1898, a monument was unveiled by Governor Frederic T. Greenhalge on the grounds of the First Church Green, near the site of the original schoolhouse, declaring Dedham's school to be the first.

=== Native Americans ===
In several towns the local Native American or Indian population supported the colonists and in turn were tolerated. Starting in 1734 English missionaries set up a series of schools for Indians in Stockbridge. The goal was to teach English ways before what was considered "savagery" became indelible. The schools were free boarding schools, where children were sent to live and study away from their families. The curriculum was designed to teach English, Christianity, and vocational skills. However, pedagogical failures, financial mismanagement, and political factionalism in the town doomed the experiment. All the schools shut down by 1754 and no similar experiments were attempted in Massachusetts.

== Reformers ==
=== Normal schools ===
The first successful effort by reformers came in 1839 after 14 years of political struggle. with the creation of three state "normal schools" to train teachers for the public schools. They were inspired by the Prussian system, but insisted on a republican theme: Public schools taught by trained teachers were needed so that education could provide everyone with a fair chance of success in life. The reformers had to overcome powerful reactionaries who appealed to taxpayers not to waste their money. The opposition held to conservative belief in an unequal society—only the well born needed an education and the common people needed to stay in their place.

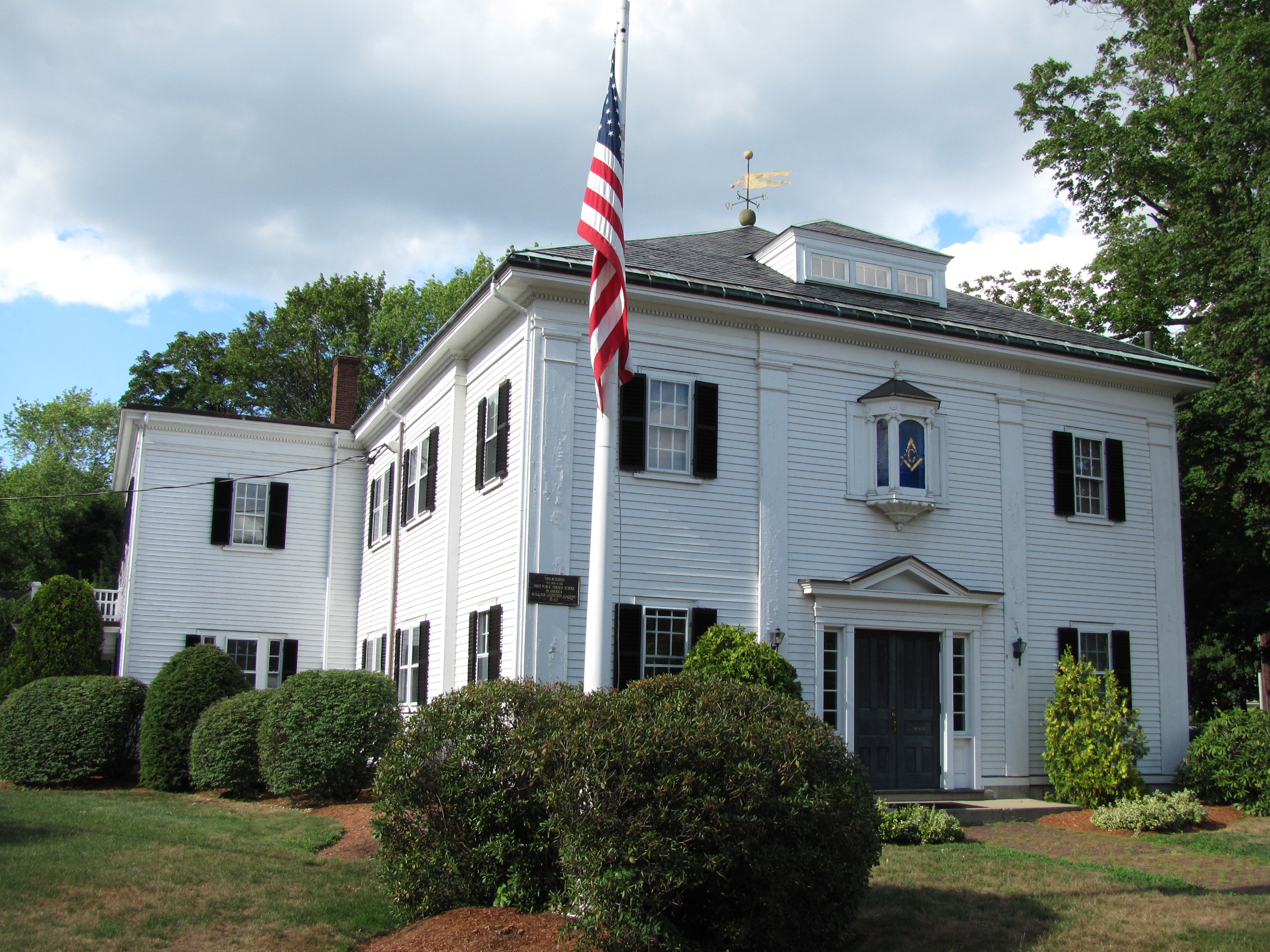
Site of the first public normal school in the United States, in Lexington, Massachusetts. This institution went on to become Framingham State University.

The first state-funded normal school in the United States was founded thanks largely to the efforts of Horace Mann and James G. Carter. In 1844 that school moved from its original site of Lexington to West Newton, and then in 1853 to Framingham. Today, Framingham State University is recognized as the oldest continuously operated public normal school in the United States. Anna Brackett attended this university and was a teacher. In 1863, she became the first woman principal of a teachers' college, the St. Louis Normal School, in Missouri.

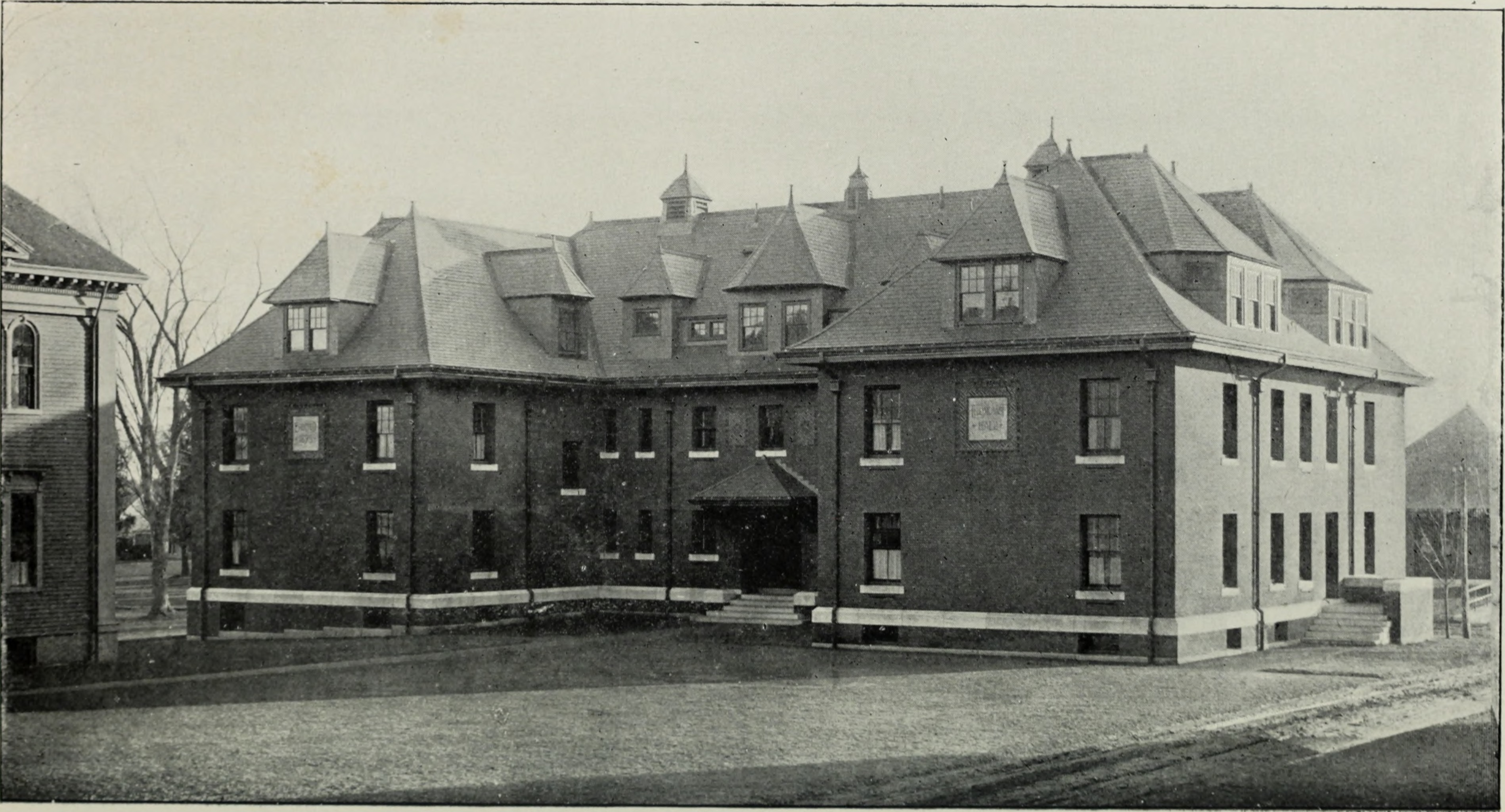
State Normal School, Bridgewater, Massachusetts (1896), today Bridgewater State University

Salem Normal School, now Salem State University, was founded in 1854 as the fourth Normal School in Massachusetts. In 1853, the General Court authorized the founding of a normal school in Essex County. Proposals were received from Salem, Chelsea, Groveland, and North Andover. Salem was selected due to many factors including the city's historical and commercial significance and need for local teacher education.

Prior to the founding of the normal school, Salem women had few opportunities to receive teacher training and the Salem school system was replete with funding, attendance, and teacher compensation problems. It was assumed that by training women as teachers, they could be hired at a lower salary than male teachers, thus alleviating the city's public school budget and teacher compensation challenges. Richard Edwards, a graduate of Bridgewater Normal School (now Bridgewater State University), was the first president of Salem Normal School.

=== Horace Mann ===
Horace Mann (1796 – 1859) was by far the most influential American educator of the 19th century. Mann's importance came in multiple areas. He was an energetic and highly articulate advocate, especially universal education. He envisioned local common schools available to every white boy, regardless of their family poverty. He argued that education was the great equalizer and essential for a democratic society. He made convincing arguments that convinced politicians and local leaders, especially when he argued that higher education levels in the work force made for a richer and more profitable economy. Mann thus earned the accolade of the "Father" of the Common School Movement that swept the Northeast and West in the 1830-1860 era. The Movement called on state governments to provide a basic public school education to every child funded by local taxes. To operate all the new schools, Mann played a crucial role in the development of teacher training schools and the professionalization of teaching. He was instrumental in establishing the first Normal schools in Massachusetts, recognizing the importance of raising the quality of rural schools through well-trained teachers. Young women could get a teaching credential in two years of study after they finished 8th grade.

=== Francis Wayland Parker ===
Francis Wayland Parker (1837 – 1902) was a pioneer of the progressive school movement. He believed that education should include the complete development of an individual—mental, physical, and moral. John Dewey called him the "father of progressive education." He worked to create curriculum that centered on the whole child and a strong language background. He was against standardization, isolated drill and rote learning. He helped to show that education was not just about cramming information into students' minds, but about teaching students to think for themselves and become independent people. As superintendent of schools in Quincy, Massachusetts. He was offered the job because of his dynamic personality and passion to change the current schooling system. There, he developed the Quincy Method, which eliminated harsh discipline and de-emphasized rote memorization, replacing them with elements of progressive education, such as group activities, the teaching of the arts and sciences, and informal methods of instruction. He rejected tests, grading and ranking systems. The model was hailed as successful, when in 1879, responding to critics of the progressive methods, state-ordered testing showed that Quincy pupils surpassed the scores of other school children in Massachusetts.

== Academies and high schools ==
From the 1880s to the 1920s, high schools grew rapidly in number and average enrollment, and in the qualification and experience of the teachers. In the 1880s colleges still emphasized Greek and Latin and mathematics. As colleges dropped requirements in Greek and Latin, the high schools responded: Greek practically disappeared and Latin was cut back. German and Spanish courses appeared, but in 1917 German was suddenly dropped when the U.S. entered the world war. Some math courses were replaced with new courses in chemistry, physics and biology. Above all there was much wider availability of a range of vocational subjects. Larger cities opened high schools focused on vocational training for industry.

A study in 1924 showed a wide range of 67 voluntary activities open to students. The most common were athletics, assemblies, debating, drama, orchestra, glee club, class meetings, and school newspaper.

== Recent policies ==
The Education Reform Act of 1993 act led to the development of academic standards and curriculum frameworks, emphasizing civic education and diversity. Between 1989 and 1996, Boston underwent a significant change in the governance of its public schools. Through legislative action and electoral outcomes, the power to appoint the members of the Boston School Committee shifted from direct election to the mayor. This gave the mayor a much stronger and more direct role in the school system's operations. This change was initiated by Boston's Mayor Raymond Flynn, who found support from the state legislature and the business community due to growing concerns about school quality. However, the elimination of the elected school committee was met with skepticism from much of the African American community and opposition from the Irish population of South Boston, who had historically held considerable influence on the committee.

The 2018 History and Social Science Curriculum Framework focuses on preparing students for civic responsibilities and understanding diverse cultural contributions.

== See also ==
- Education in Massachusetts
- History of Massachusetts
- History of education in the United States
- History of education in Dedham, Massachusetts
- List of industrial schools
- List of high schools in Massachusetts
- Normal school
- Common school
- Manual labor college
- Massachusetts Board of Education
- Francis Wayland Parker, a pioneer of the progressive school movement in the United States

== Works cited ==
- Hanson, Robert Brand (1976). Dedham, Massachusetts, 1635-1890. Dedham Historical Society.
- Hart, Albert Bushnell ed. Commonwealth history of Massachusetts, colony, province and state; vol 5: Twentieth Century Massachusetts (1889-1930) (1930) online, see Chapter 8 pp 233–266.
- Lockridge, Kenneth (1985). A New England Town. New York: W.W. Norton & Company. ISBN 978-0-393-95459-3.
- Smith, Frank (1936). A History of Dedham, Massachusetts. Transcript Press, Incorporated.
