= William Heard Kilpatrick =

American pedagogue (1871–1965)

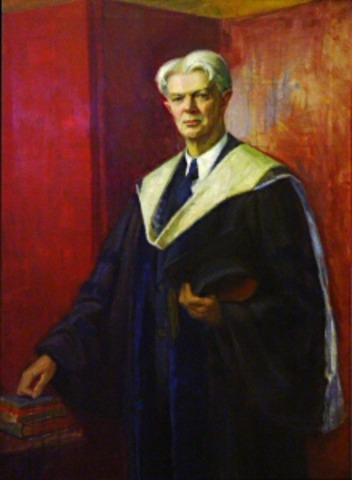
William Heard Kilpatrick

William Heard Kilpatrick (November 20, 1871 – February 13, 1965) was an American pedagogue and a pupil, a colleague and a successor of John Dewey. Kilpatrick was a major figure in the progressive education movement of the early 20th century.

== Biography ==
Kilpatrick was born in White Plains, Georgia. He had an orthodox upbringing and was educated at Mercer University and Johns Hopkins University, where he later became a mathematics teacher at a high school and at Mercer University. He first met John Dewey in 1898 and again met him in 1907. Kilpatrick decided to make philosophy of education his specialty and attended all courses given by Dewey at Teachers College, Columbia University. From this developed a cooperation, which persisted up to Dewey's death in 1952. Both men's ideas directly impacted the 1932 founding of Bennington College in Vermont: they were both on the original College Board of Trustees, with Kilpatrick soon becoming President of the Board, and two of the original 12 houses on campus are named after them.

His first teaching job was at Blakely Institute, a combined elementary and secondary public school in southwest Georgia, which required that he attend a July 1892 summer at Rock College Normal School, Athens, GA. There he learned of the educational theories of German educator Friedrich Wilhelm August Fröbel (1782-1852), kindergarten founder and learning-through-play advocate. He again studied at Johns Hopkins University, summer of 1895, then taught seventh grade and was principal at Anderson Elementary School, Savannah, GA, 1896–97. He was at Mercer University, 1897–1906, taught mathematics, was vice-president, 1900, and acting president, 1904–06, but resigned when the trustees were concerned about his doubting the virgin birth of Mary, the mother of Jesus Christ.

In 1907-09, Kilpatrick was a student in Teachers College at Columbia University (New York City), where he took courses in history of education under Paul Monroe (1869-1947), philosophy of education under John Angus MacVannel (1871-1915), psychology under Edward Lee Thorndike(1874-1949), and philosophy under Frederick James Eugene Woodbridge (1867-1940) and John Dewey. In 1908 Kilpatrick wrote in his diary: "Professor Dewey has made a great difference in my thinking." Dewey wrote to MacVannel and said the following about Kilpatrick: "He is the best [student] I ever had." Dewey was Kilpatrick's most important professor and mentor while Kilpatrick was a student at Teachers College. Kilpatrick spent his professional career and the rest of his long life at Teachers College, Columbia University, where he was instructor in history of education (1909-1911), received a Ph.D. in 1911 with his thesis (supervised by Paul Monroe) titled The Dutch Schools of New Netherland and Colonial New York (published in 1912 in various editions), was assistant professor of philosophy of education (1911–1915), associate professor of philosophy of education (1915–1918), full professor of philosophy of education (1918–1937), and emeritus professor thereafter.

Kilpatrick's 1st wife was Mary (Marie) Beman Guyton (November 12, 1874 - May 29, 1907). William and Mary married on December 27, 1898, and they had three children. William's 2nd wife was Margaret Manigault Pinckney (December 4, 1861 - November 24, 1938). William and Margaret were married on November 26, 1908. William's 3rd and final marriage was to Marion Isabella Ostrander (December 23, 1891 - January 29, 1975) on May 8, 1940, she having been his secretary.

Kilpatrick taught summers at the University of Georgia, 1906, 1908, and 1909; the University of the South (Sewanee), 1907; was visiting professor, Northwestern University, 1937–38, and taught summer sessions there, 1939–1941; taught summer sessions, Stanford University, 1938; University of Kentucky, 1942; University of North Carolina, 1942; and University of Minnesota, 1946. His trips abroad included school visits, lectures, and meetings with prominent educators in Italy, Switzerland, and France, May–June 1912; Europe and Asia, August 1926-June 1927; and round the world, August–December 1929.

He received honorary LL.D. degrees from Mercer University, 1926; Columbia University, 1929; and Bennington College, 1938 (which he helped found in 1923 and where he was president of the board of trustees, 1931–38); the honorary D.H.L. degree from the College of Jewish Studies, 1952; and the Brandeis Award for humanitarian service, 1953.

After retiring from TCCU, 1937, he was president of the New York Urban League, 1941–51; chairman of American Youth for World Youth, 1946–51; chairman of the Bureau of International Education, 1940–51.

Kilpatrick had several critics but many more admirers and followers. His eighty-fifth birthday, November 20, 1956, celebrated at Horace Mann Auditorium, TCCU, resulted in a special March 1957 issue of Progressive Education, "William Heard Kilpatrick Eighty-Fifth Anniversary," containing 10 articles. Both heralded and criticized as John Dewey's chief educational interpreter, Kilpatrick was a leading advocate of progressive education.

He died after a long illness in New York City on February 13, 1965, at the age of 93.

== Philosophy of education ==
Kilpatrick developed the Project Method for early childhood education, which was a form of Progressive Education that organized curriculum and classroom activities around a subject's central theme. He believed that the role of a teacher should be that of a "guide" as opposed to an authoritarian figure. Kilpatrick believed that children should direct their own learning according to their interests and should be allowed to explore their environment, experiencing their learning through the natural senses. Proponents of Progressive Education and the Project Method reject traditional schooling that focuses on memorization, rote learning, strictly organized classrooms (desks in rows; students always seated), and typical forms of assessment. He has been described as a developmentalist.

Kilpatrick published Foundations of Method – Informal Talks on Teaching in 1925.

== Political views ==
Kilpatrick was a democratic socialist and served on the board of directors of the League for Industrial Democracy.

== See also ==
- Carl Rogers
