= Eight-Year Study =

The Eight-Year Study was an experiment that tested how American progressive secondary schools would prepare their students for college when released from the curricular restrictions of college admissions requirements. Between 1933 and 1941, the Progressive Education Association sponsored curricular experimentation in 29 model schools with the security that over 200 colleges would admit their students on the recommendations of their principals rather than curricular requirements. The schools received curricular consultants, but were otherwise uninhibited in their curricular choices. Their changes tended towards individualized student attention, with more cross-disciplinary programming and greater emphasis on arts and extracurriculars. The General Education Board and other foundations offered significant financial backing towards the study.

The study concluded that, when compared to their peers in traditional secondary school programs, students of the study's experimental programs performed on par academically and showed more activity in artistic, political, and social engagement. Students of the study's most experimental schools outperformed the others. The implications of the study were limited by the natural advantages of the student–participants' high social class backgrounds and their schools' lack of privations, even before the study's added resources. The reforms instituted in the participant schools subsided within a decade of the study's end, owing to the more conservative political climate of World War II and the Cold War, the reforms' increased labor demands on teachers, and increased competition in college admissions. Nevertheless, the study showed that the curricular structure of American high schools could change under propitious conditions. Its influence was reflected not in direct change but its influence on its participants and subsequent reformers.

== Design and implementation ==
Based on the criticism that American secondary education curriculum had been designed to meet the needs of college admissions rather than those of students, the Progressive Education Association sponsored an eight-year study between 1933 and 1941 to determine whether young adults could excel in college if college admission requirements were revoked. The Progressive Education Association's Commission on the Relation of School and College convinced more than 200 colleges to admit highly qualified high school students on the recommendations of high school principals who participate in the study. The colleges, who suffered decreased enrollment during the Great Depression, were relatively easy to recruit. And of 200 nominated high schools, 29 were chosen based on their repute, including 10 public high schools (including all of those in Denver), six university-based high schools, and 13 independent schools. With their college admissions requirements lifted, the high schools began to experiment with their curriculum. The commission provided curriculum consultants and analysts to the schools, but otherwise did not intervene in their experimentation.

Similar patterns of curricular reform developed across the participant high schools. Programming was increasingly cross-disciplinary, with former emphasis on traditional classes displaced for more arts programming. Teachers engaged in more collaborative class planning and prep and changed their class sizes and lengths. Students blended formal and informal education in programs that included community service, group decision-making, and artistic productions. Many schools chose to constitute smaller mini-schools within their high schools. In general, these changes shifted school emphasis from factory model schools to individualized student attention.

The General Education Board and other foundations contributed more than a million dollars (equivalent to $24 million in 2024) towards the study.

== Effects ==
The study concluded that graduates of the Eight-Year Study high schools received grades on par with their equivalent peers from traditional high schools, but were more active in artistic, political, and social activities. Additionally, graduates of the study's high schools with most progressive changes fared better than the high schools that made more modest changes. These results were unsurprising given the relative advantages of the study's students and schools: youth with the relative advantages of high social class upbringing coming from well-equipped schools. The participants also reaped advantages from curricular resources (consultants, grants, publicity) that would not be afforded to similar efforts.

Even as the Progressive Education Association's director trumpeted that multiple preparatory paths could lead to college success, the reforms subsided in the participant schools within a decade. Representatives from across the study met in 1950 and concluded that their schools had returned to fundamentals, focusing on mechanics of spelling over writing assignments and Carnegie unit preparatory regimentation over time spent on arts and extracurriculars. These representatives said that World War II and Cold War security concerns—and their resulting conservative authoritarianism—overrode progressive interests in both society and the school.

Internal to the high schools, the demands of collaborative teaching and the programmatic setbacks of high staff turnover wore upon teachers. These progressive factions had limited entry in the participating schools, and when their progressive approach faltered, traditionalists reasserted authority. Upon inspection, some of the study's model schools had implemented little progressive reform and instead appeared to have joined the study for reasons of prestige. The schools that continued to experiment post-study were predominantly those that had been most progressive before the study started. External to the high schools, colleges became more selective as applicants increased in the late 1940s. Colleges did not adopt the study's recommendations for reasons of disbelief or ignorance.

The Eight-Year Study showed that the curricular structure of American high schools could change under propitious conditions: when families and teachers held liberal ideology, colleges relaxed vetting mechanisms, and foundations offered support. The study brought a brief period of energy and happiness to its participants, who considered the effort worthwhile in retrospect. Its major impact was not direct change but its influence on its participants and subsequent reformers.

== Bibliography ==
- Tyack, David B.; Cuban, Larry (1995). Tinkering Toward Utopia: A Century of Public School Reform. Cambridge, Mass.: Harvard University Press. ISBN 0-674-89282-8.
