= NeonSeon =

American cartoonist

NeonSeon is the pen name of American writer and illustrator Seon Ricks. Ricks was born on December 6, 1974, in Hyde Park, Chicago.

Ricks created a comic strip called Shouty Mack for her high school newspaper, The Weekly, at Francis W. Parker School. Years later she developed the character Shouty into the book series Life of Shouty.

Released under the pseudonym NeonSeon, the debut book in the series, Life of Shouty: Good Habits, came out May 2010. Good Habits was selected by the Midwest Book Review for inclusion in the Children's Bookwatch. Her second book, Life of Shouty: Food Fitness, debuted October 2011.

Ricks attended the John W. Draper Program at New York University Graduate School of Arts and Science and received an MA in Humanities and Social Thought.
