= Arden Pala =

American philanthropist and author

- Born: Arden Pala; 2009; San Diego, California, U.S.
- Education: Francis Parker School (San Diego)
- Occupation: Philanthropist · Nonprofit executive · Author · Filmmaker
- Years active: 2019–present
- Organization(s): Sports4Kids; Helptivo
- Known for: Founder & CEO of Sports4Kids · Founder & CEO of Helptivo
- Awards: 2024 SportsKid of the Year (Sports Illustrated)

Arden Pala is an American philanthropist, author, actor, and filmmaker. He is known for founding the nonprofit organization Sports4Kids. He received a 2024 Presidential Lifetime Achievement Award and a President's Council Award for his work with Sports4Kids. He is the youngest person to receive a President's Council Award.

Pala is also the author of the children's book series The Adventures of Noah's Flying Car. He wrote and directed the documentary film A Second Chance.

== Early life and education ==
Pala was born to Turkish immigrants Serhat Pala and Zeynep Ilgaz Pala, who are the cofounders of a biotech company, Confirm Biosciences. He also has an older brother named Kenan, that started the non-profit organization Kids4Community.

As of 2025, he was a sophomore at Francis Parker High.

== Career ==
Pala published his first book, The Adventures of Noah's Flying Car Through China.

Pala starred as Zalmai in the 2018 production of the play A Thousand Splendid Suns at The Old Globe in Balboa Park.

In 2018 and 2019, he starred as Ladybug Who in The Old Globe's production of How the Grinch Stole Christmas.

Pala published his second book, The Adventures of Noah's Flying Car Through Turkey, in 2019.

In 2020, Pala published the third book in The Adventures of Noah's Flying Car series, The Adventures of Noah's Flying Car Through Mexico. He donated the proceeds from the book to the San Diego COVID-19 Community Respond Fund. Pala was named Best Child Actor at the 2020 Los Angeles Film Festival for his performance in the short film Tahz. In 2020, Pala also founded Sports4Kids, a charity that raises funds to provide sports equipment and coaching for elementary schools in underprivileged areas.

In 2021, he released a documentary film on homelessness, A Second Chance, which he wrote and directed. For his work on the film, he received the Best Young Male Filmmaker award from the Los Angeles International Film Festival/Indie Shot Fest. The film was also chosen as a finalist at the New Filmmakers NY and Oniros Film Awards NY film festivals and an official selection in the New York Movie Awards and the LA Live Film Fest.

Pala organized the Bags of Hope event, which provided relief for the 2023 Turkey-Syria earthquakes. In 2023, he also organized the Christmas Bags of Hope event, which provided essentials, toys, and other items for homeless children in the San Diego area.

Sports Illustrated named Pala its SportsKid of the Year for his work with Sports4Kids in 2024. He also received a Presidential Lifetime Achievement award and a President's Council on Sports, Fitness & Nutrition Community Leadership Award in the same year. He was the youngest person to receive a President's Council Award. In recognition of his philanthropic efforts, the city of San Diego also proclaimed February 23 as "Arden Pala Day." In 2024, Pala also received the Starbucks Neighborhood Grant for his efforts with the homeless population.

He is also the founder and CEO of Helptivo, a software platform that provides tools for organizations to manage members, coordinate events, track volunteer hours, and communicate with their communities.

== Filmography ==
Title	Type	Year	Writer	Actor	Director	Ref
Tahz	Short film	2020	No	Yes	No	
A Second Chance	Documentary film	2021	Yes	No	Yes	
Forgetting Caroline	Short film	2021	No	Yes	No	
The Bracero Program	Short film	2021	No	No	Yes	
The Mission	Short film	2022	No	Yes	No	

== Bibliography ==
- Pala, A. (2017). The Adventures of Noah's Flying Car Through China. Kids4Community.
- Pala, A. (2019). The Adventures of Noah's Flying Car Through Turkey. Kids4Community.
- Pala, A. (2020). The Adventures of Noah's Flying Car Through Mexico. Kids4Community.
