= Jeff Lyon =

American photographer

Jeff Lyon (born 1945) is an American journalist most noted for his work with The Chicago Tribune, for which he won a Pulitzer Prize for Explanatory Journalism in 1987.

== Background ==
Lyon was born in Chicago in 1945. He studied at the Francis W. Parker High School and graduated with a BSJ from the Medill School of Journalism at Northwestern University. He is married to Bonita Brodt who is a feature writer for the Tribune. The couple has one daughter and live in Chicago.

== Journalism ==
Lyon first worked at The Miami Herald and then moved back to Chicago to begin work at both American and Chicago Today for eight years. Following that he began work at the Tribune as well as its Sunday magazine. In 1976 he became a columnist for that journal and then five years later a feature writer. Lyon held the role of Deputy Editor at the Tribune and Director of the science writing program at Chicago’s Columbia College.

== Awards and acclaim ==
Lyon won the Pulitzer Prize, together with Peter Gorner, for The Chicago Tribune “for [the seven part ‘Altered Fates, The Promise of Gene Therapy’ 1986] series on the promises of gene therapy, which examined the implications of this revolutionary medical treatment.” According to Tribune Editor James D. Squires, the Altered Fates series “is an outstanding example of the kind of excellence in journalism symbolized by the Pulitzer Prize. In 1986, the Tribune had a number of outstanding reporting efforts we think worthy of the Pulitzer, but theirs was indeed our best.

Lyon was the recipient of the 1984 National Headliner Award for a Tribune series on the care of congenitally handicapped newborns. Thereafter he expanded this work and wrote a book based on it, called, Playing God in the Nursery.
