= Francis Wayland Parker =

American pioneer of the progressive school movement

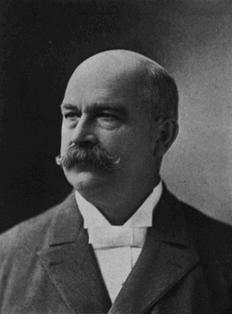
- Born: October 9, 1837; Bedford, New Hampshire, U.S.
- Died: March 2, 1902 (aged 64); Pass Christian, Mississippi, U.S.
- Resting place: Piscataquog Cemetery, Manchester, New Hampshire, U.S.
- Education: Humboldt University of Berlin; Dartmouth College (MA)
- Known for: Pioneering the progressive school movement in the United States

Francis Wayland Parker (October 9, 1837 – March 2, 1902) was a pioneer of the progressive school movement in the United States. He believed that education should include the complete development of an individual — mental, physical, and moral. John Dewey called him the "father of progressive education." He worked to create curriculum that centered on the whole child and a strong language background. He was against standardization, isolated drill and rote learning. He helped to show that education was not just about cramming information into students' minds, but about teaching students to think for themselves and become independent people.

== Biography ==
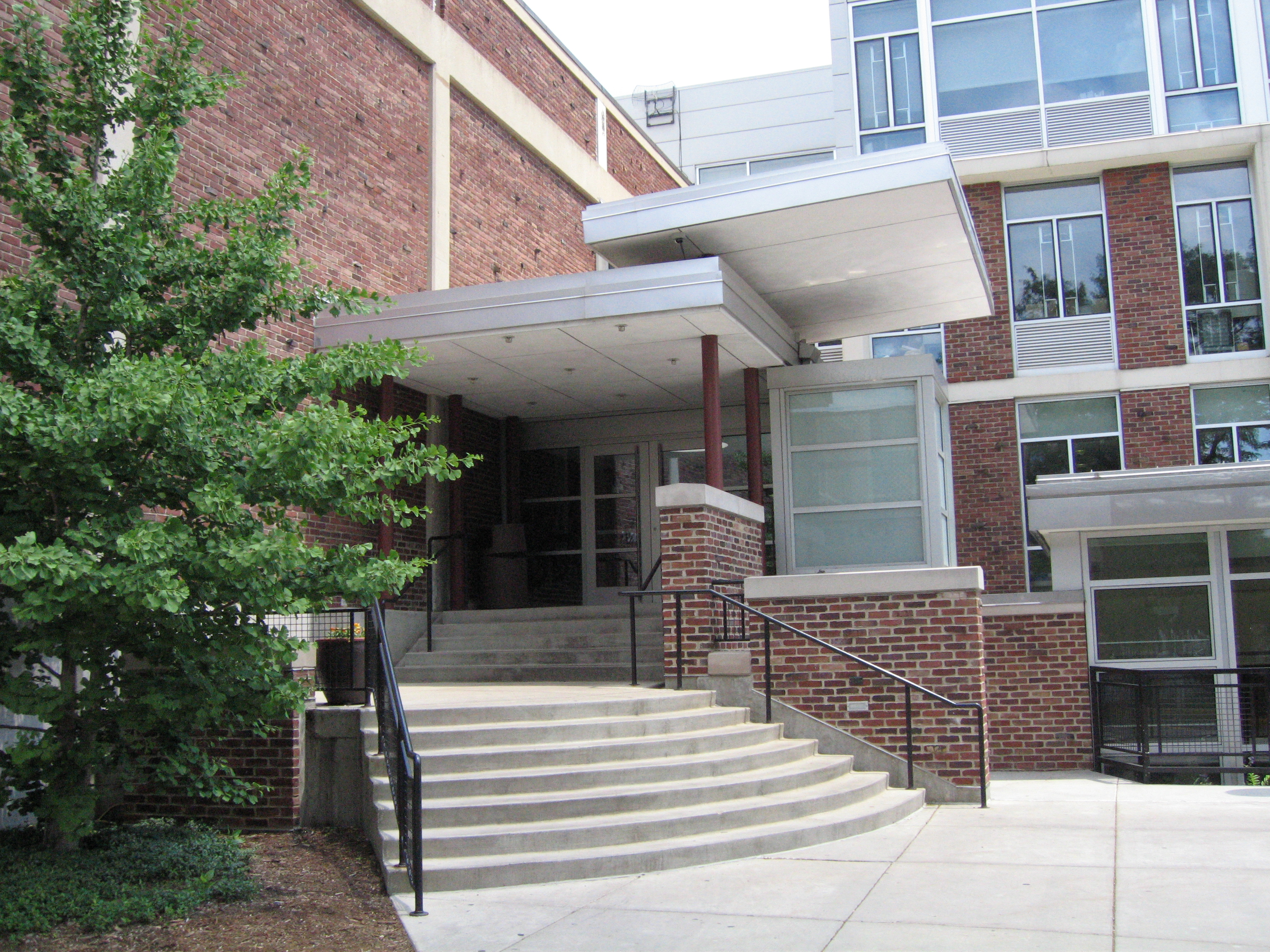
Colonel Parker founded the Francis W. Parker School in 1901, with the support of benefactor Anita McCormick Blaine.

Parker was born in Bedford, New Hampshire in Hillsborough County. He was educated in the public schools and began his career as a village teacher in New Hampshire at age 16. He taught 75 children at Corser Hill at Boscawen, New Hampshire, making 15 dollars a month. Many of his students were older and had been exposed to more of the curriculum than him. After teaching in Boscawen, he began to teach in Auburn, New Hampshire, making 18 dollars a month. At 16 years old, he taught in Hinsdale, Massachusetts, and eventually took charge of all the grammar schools in his town Piscataquis, New Hampshire. At 21 years old he became the principal of a school in Carrollton, Illinois.

In August 1861, at the beginning of the American Civil War, Parker enlisted as a private in the 4th New Hampshire Volunteer Infantry. He was elected lieutenant and was later promoted to captain and commander of the company. He was promoted to Lieutenant Colonel and commander of the 4th New Hampshire in January 1865, serving in St. Augustine, Florida—part of that time in the brig. He was captured and held prisoner in North Carolina in May 1865.

After the war ended, Colonel Parker resumed teaching, first in Ohio, where he became the head of the normal school in Dayton, Ohio. In 1872, he traveled to Germany to study at the Humboldt University of Berlin. In Europe, Parker examined the new methods of pedagogy being developed there, proposed by European theorists, such as Jean-Jacques Rousseau, Friedrich Fröbel, Johann Heinrich Pestalozzi and particularly Johann Friedrich Herbart. Parker asserted that students benefit most from reading works of high interest, thereby activating background knowledge. A supporter of balanced instruction, he encouraged the use of the elements of phonics, as well as lists of word families, onsets and rimes, to assist in word recognition. This innovative educator integrated the skill areas of reading, writing, listening and speaking. Parker advocated many of the current language experience and process writing approach methodologies. He believed that children should write across the content areas on subjects that interested them, for enjoyment and that the proper form would come with practice. All writing should be natural and connected to authentic and meaningful activities, using the child's own vocabulary; in other words, experience based writing. Parker was a teacher, principal and a lecturer, who wanted all children to have their own slate boards, so they could write and draw freely without fear of mistakes.

Between 1875 and 1880, Parker was able to put his philosophy into practice, when he served as superintendent of schools in Quincy, Massachusetts. He was offered the job because of his dynamic personality and passion to change the current schooling system. There, he developed the Quincy Method, which eliminated harsh discipline and de-emphasized rote memorization, replacing them with elements of progressive education, such as group activities, the teaching of the arts and sciences, and informal methods of instruction. He rejected tests, grading and ranking systems. The model was hailed as successful, when in 1879, responding to critics of the progressive methods, state-ordered testing showed that Quincy pupils surpassed the scores of other school children in Massachusetts.

He continued to implement his theories as superintendent of the Boston Public Schools (1880–83) and principal of the Cook County Normal School, Chicago (1883–99). While Principal of the Cook County Normal School he constantly experimented with the children of Cook County, trying to expand and develop his curriculum. He experimented with new theories and tried to perfect his plan for education. He was not afraid of failure, saying, "The road to success is through constant blundering". With his likeable personality and his progressive theories, he was able to reform the Cook County Normal School. Reading, spelling, and writing became a subject known as communication. Art and physical education were added to the weekly curriculum. He taught science through the study of nature. He even created a band with the children who studied music. During this period of time, Parker published five books on education, including: Talks on Teaching (New York, 1883); The Practical Teacher (1884); Course in Arithmetic (1884); Talks on Pedagogies (1894); and How to Teach Geography (1885). Dartmouth College awarded Parker the degree of M.A. in 1886. In the next phase of his educational career, Parker founded and served as principal (1899–1901) for a private experimental school, the Chicago Institute, which became the University of Chicago School of Education in 1901.

In 1901, Parker merged Chicago Institute with the University of Chicago Laboratory Schools and worked with kindergarten and elementary school age children. To further put his theories into practice, the Francis W. Parker School opened in Chicago with an initial enrollment of one hundred and eighty students. A second school was founded in San Diego in 1912. Both schools exist today.

In poor health, Parker was sent by his doctors to the South for a better climate. He died at age 64 in Pass Christian, Harrison County, Mississippi. His ashes were returned to New Hampshire, in May 1902 and were interred at Piscataquog Cemetery, Manchester, New Hampshire.

In addition to the schools in New York, Illinois, Indiana, and California, the Francis W. Parker Charter Essential School was founded in Massachusetts in 1995, in honor of Parker's contributions to the field of progressive education. An elementary school in Quincy also bears Parker's name, as does one in Rochester, New York.

== See also ==
- Alternative Education
- History of education in Massachusetts
