= Kate Levant =

American artist

- Born: 1983 (age 42–43); Chicago, Illinois, U.S.
- Education: Yale University, School of the Museum of Fine Arts, Boston
- Occupation: Artist
- Known for: Sculpture

Kate Levant (born 1983) is an American artist. She is the co-founder and executive of KAJE, a non-profit exhibition space and publisher in Gowanus.

== Life and education ==
Kate Levant was born in 1983 in Chicago. She attended the Francis W. Parker School (Chicago) and in high school, the Chicago Academy for the Arts. She has degrees from Yale University and the School of the Museum of Fine Arts, Boston. She had referred to Detroit as a "second home".

== Career ==
Kate Levant is an American sculptor and conceptual artist. Her work has been included in the 2012 Whitney Biennial at Whitney Museum of American Art. She is represented by Monique Meloche in Chicago. Previously, she was represented by Zach Feuer Gallery in New York. She uses salvaged industrial materials, papers, aluminum foil and household items to create abstract assemblages. The concepts driving these sculptures have been described by Natalie Haddad at Hyperallergic as "systems that sustain life and society, and the consequences of their breakdown, remain at the heart of her practice". Her work has been compared to Robert Rauschenberg. Of what drives the form of her work, the artist has said: "The material, the substances and subjects themselves, seem to be what has the whip in them…I don’t feel in charge of the dynamic." In the past, she has also said: "I recycle a lot of stuff. Even if I finish a piece, it is hard for me to let it stay done and not be re-involved."

She is known for her collaborations with sculptor Michael E. Smith in Detroit.

As of 2018, Levant is the director of KAJE, a non-profit space dedicated to experimental art that she co-founded with artist Jacques Louis Vidal.

== Critical reception ==
Critics frequently mention Levant's 2009 exhibition Blood Drive at Zach Feuer Gallery—launched while still a graduate student at Yale University—as the launch of her career. That show consistent of a series of sculptures that included a "Waiting Area", assemblage sculptures resembling furniture, and an actual blood drive.

Kate Levant's art was included in a discussion of work in the 2012 Whitney Biennial by Michael Wilson in Art in America. In the article, he describes her work "mourning" the loss of America's Manufacturing Industry.

In 2016, critic Natalie Haddad, writing about concurrent solo exhibitions in Chicago and Detroit appraised Levant's practice as having further evolved since Blood Drive: "her preoccupation with the systems that sustain life and society, and the consequences of their breakdown, remain at the heart of her practice. Her approach, transforming salvaged and industrial materials into subtle but suggestive abstractions, informs her current shows."

== Exhibitions ==
- 2009: Blood Drive: Compromised by Kate Levant, Zach Feuer
- 2011: This is Laced, Zach Feuer
- 2012: Closure of Jaw, Zach Feuer
- 2012: Whitney Biennial, The Whitney Museum of Art
- 2014: Reverse Leash Affect, Zach Feuer
- 2016: Which’s Ploying the Fans, Monique Meloche
- 2017: Use Your Indicator, Clima
