= Eugene Lipov =

Eugene G. Lipov
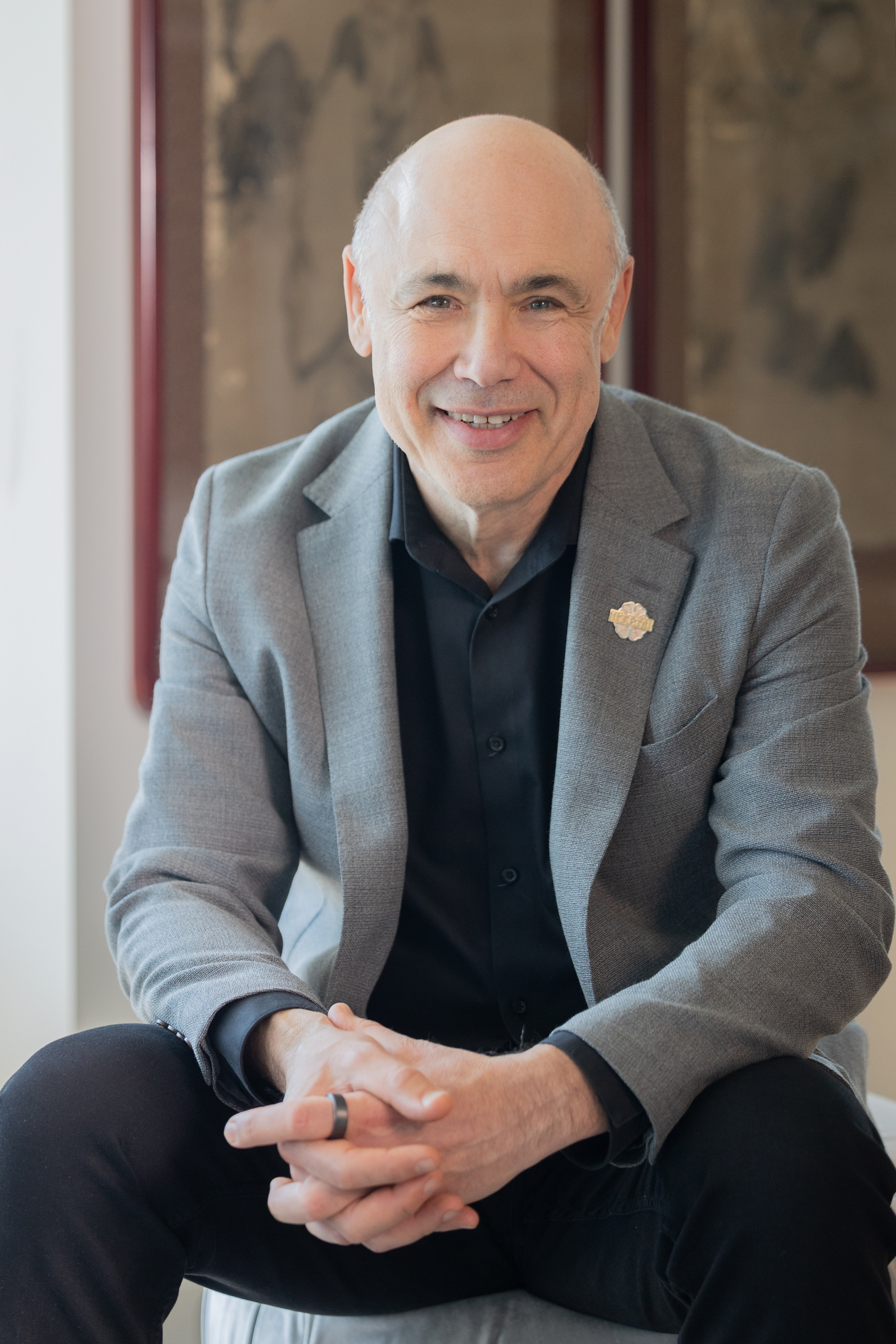
- Lipov in 2025
- Born: 1958 (age 67–68); Cherkasy, Ukrainian SSR, Soviet Union (now Ukraine)
- Education: B.A, Northwestern University; M.D., Feinberg School of Medicine; University of Illinois; Rush St. Luke's
- Occupations: Physician Researcher, Anesthesiologist & Pain Management Specialist
- Years active: 30
- Known for: Intervention-based pain management & the use of the stellate ganglion block for hot flashes & PTSD

Eugene G. Lipov (born 1958) is a physician researcher and board-certified anesthesiologist who specializes in intervention-based pain management in the Chicago area. He is best known for his treatment of post-traumatic stress disorder (PTSD) using a technique called stellate ganglion block (SGB).

== Background ==
Born in the Ukrainian SSR, Lipov and his family emigrated to the United States in 1973. Once settled in Chicago, his father Gregory, a cardiovascular surgeon, and his mother Mary, an endocrinologist, were among the first group of physicians to take care of local Russian émigrés. Both Lipov and his older brother Sergei went on to have careers in medicine as adults.

== Education ==
A Frances W. Parker School (Chicago) graduate, Lipov received his bachelor's in biochemistry from Northwestern University in 1980. A medical degree from Feinberg School of Medicine followed in 1984, and Lipov moved to Cook County Hospital/University of Illinois for a surgical residency. He spent two years in an anesthesiology residency at the University of Illinois before completing his training at Rush St Luke's with advanced training in pain management.

== Pain management research & treatment ==
Lipov's scholarly research and interests include the development of new approaches for pain conditions, and old approaches for new indications. He has developed a new stimulator approach called the "Hybrid Stimulator" for back and leg pain. He was also the first to report a successful use of stellate ganglion block for hot flashes and PTSD.

Lipov's PTSD research earned him an invitation to testify before the U.S. House Committee on Veteran's Affairs in 2010. His work also garnered references from former Congressman Rahm Emanuel, then Senator Barack Obama, and Senator Richard Durbin, among others.

Lipov has authored over 40 medical publications, including journal articles, book chapters and abstracts, as well as two theoretical papers explaining the mechanisms of the effects observed in the controversial and non-peer reviewed journal Medical Hypotheses. His "unified theory" purports to explain the prolonged effects of local anesthetic placed on the stellate ganglion resolving complex regional pain syndrome (CRPS). It also purports to explain positive effect of SGB on estrogen depletion, hot flashes, PTSD and other conditions.

Lipov has made numerous media appearances relating to his work on the treatment of chronic pain. Many have focused on novel disk treatments, implantable neuro-stimulators for lower back pain and treatment of back and leg pain after surgery. His recent focus has been hot flash treatments and PTSD due to the lack of other effective treatments. He has a podcast called Brain, Hope, Reality. In 2010, he testified before the United States House Veteran Affairs Committee about the efficacy of stellate ganglion block on PTSD.

== Personal life ==
Lipov lives with his wife and one son, who co-authored The Adventures of Captain Heart with him at the age of 4.
