= Arthur Maling =

American novelist

Arthur Gordon Maling (June 11, 1923 – October 24, 2013) was an American writer of crime and thriller novels. He graduated from Francis W. Parker School, Chicago in 1940; in 1944 he received a B.A. from Harvard University. In the Second World War Maling was an ensign in the U.S. Navy from 1944 to 1945. From 1945 to 1946 he was a reporter for the San Diego Journal. After 1946, he worked as an executive manager for Maling Brothers, a retail shoe chain.

== Bibliography ==
=== Brock Potter Series ===
- Ripoff (1976)
- Schroeder's Game (1977)
- Lucky Devil (1978)
- Koberg Link (1979)
- A Taste of Treason (1983)

=== Other novels ===
- Decoy (1969)
- Go-Between (UK Title: Lambert's Son) (1970)
- Loophole (1971)
- The Snowman (1973)
- Dingdong (1974)
- Bent Man (1975)
- Mystery Writer's Choice (1978)
- The Rheingold Route (1979); Winner of the Edgar Award.
- From Thunder Bay (1981)
- Lover and Thief (1988)
