= Project method =

Educational philosophy

The project method is a medium of instruction which was introduced during the 18th century into the schools of architecture and engineering in Europe when graduating students had to apply the skills and knowledge they had learned in the course of their studies to problems they had to solve as practicians of their trade, for example, designing a monument, building a steam engine. In the early 20th Century, William Heard Kilpatrick expanded the project method into a philosophy of education. His device is child-centered and based in progressive education. Both approaches are used by teachers worldwide to this day. Unlike traditional education, proponents of the project method attempt to allow the student to solve problems with as little teacher direction as possible. The teacher is seen more as a facilitator than a deliver of knowledge and information.

Students in a project method environment should be allowed to explore and experience their environment through their senses and, in a sense, direct their own learning by their individual interests. Very little is taught from textbooks and the emphasis is on experiential learning, rather than rote and memorization. A project method classroom focuses on democracy and collaboration to solve "purposeful" problems.

Kilpatrick devised four classes of projects for his method: construction (such as writing a play), enjoyment (such as experiencing a concert), problem (for instance, discussing a complex social problem like poverty), and specific learning (learning of skills such as swimming).

== Literature ==
- Knoll, Michael (1996): Faking a dissertation: Ellsworth Collings, William H. Kilpatrick and the "project curriculum". Journal of Curriculum Studies 28, no. 2, pp. 193–222.
- Knoll, Michael (1997): The Project Method: Its Vocational Education Origin and International Development. Journal of Industrial Teacher Education 34, 59-80.
- Knoll, Michael (2010): "A Marriage on the Rocks": An Unknown Letter by William H. Kilpatrick About His Project Method. Eric-online document 511129.
- Knoll, Michael (2012): “I Had Made a Mistake”: William H. Kilpatrick and the Project Method. Teachers College Record 114, issue 2, 45 pages.
- Knoll, Michael (2014) Project Method. In D. C. Phillips (ed) Encyclopedia of Educational Theory and Philosophy, Vol. 2 (London: Sage), 665-669.
