= Francis W. Parker School (Chicago) =

Private school in Chicago, Illinois, U.S.

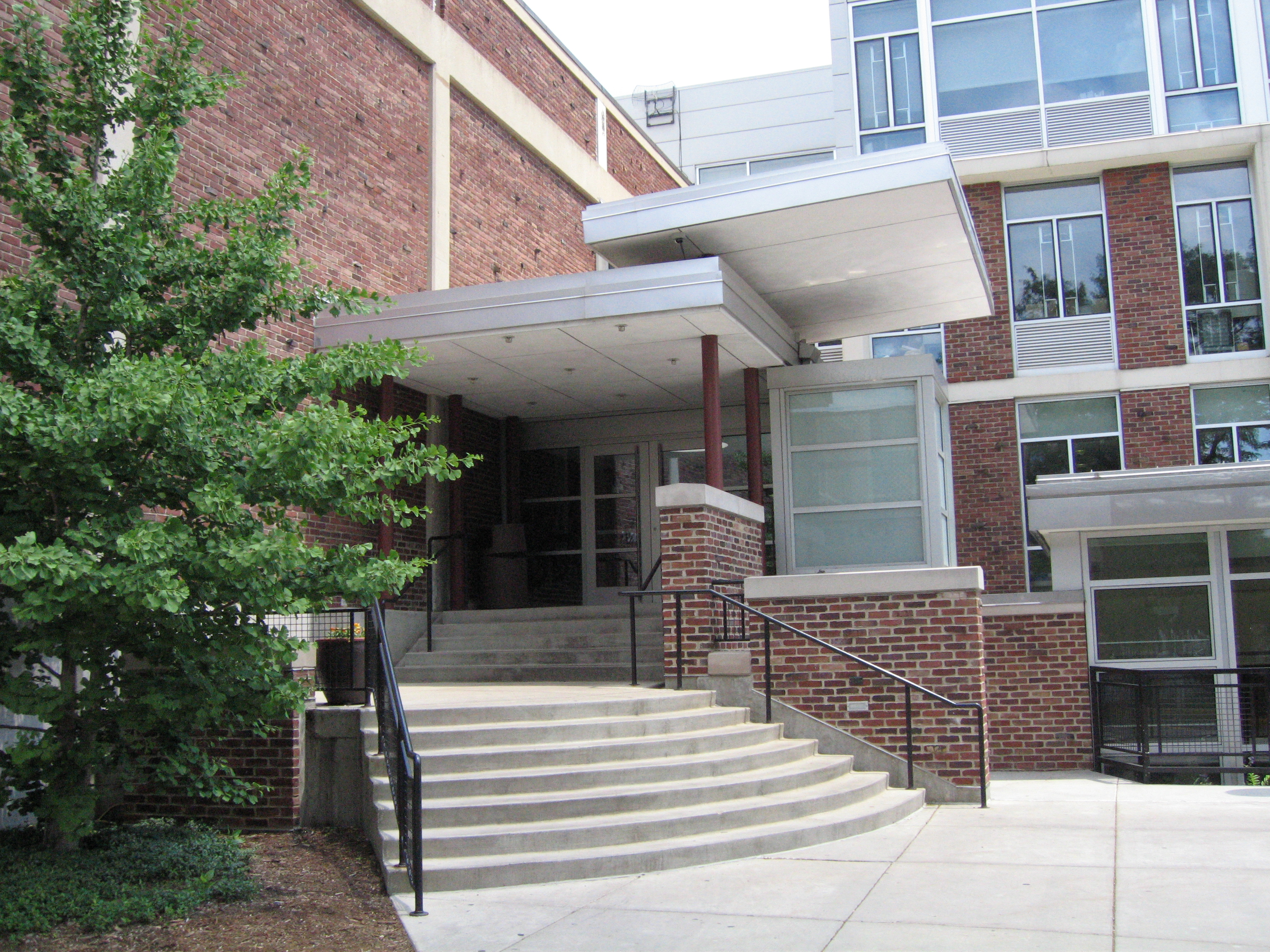
- Francis W. Parker's main entrance in 2007

Location
- 330 W. Webster Ave. Chicago, Illinois 60614; United States; 41.9227°N 87.6379°W

Information
- School type: Private school
- Motto: Everything to help and nothing to hinder
- Established: 1901 (125 years ago)
- Founder: Francis Wayland Parker
- Status: Open
- CEEB code: 140830
- Principal: Dan Frank
- Employees: 265
- Grades: Pre-kindergarten–12
- Gender: Mixed-sex education
- Age: 4 to 18
- Enrollment: 940 (2025–26)
- Student to teacher ratio: 6:1
- Education system: Progressive education
- Campus size: 6 acres
- Campus type: Urban
- Colors: Blue and white
- Song: We Thy Children
- Athletics conference: Independent School League
- Sports: Baseball, Basketball, Cross country running, Field hockey, Golf, Robotics, Scholastic bowl, Soccer, Softball, Tennis, Track and field, Volleyball
- Mascot: The Colonel; The Eagle
- Team name: Colonels
- Rival: Latin School of Chicago
- Accreditation: North Central Association of Colleges and Schools
- Newspaper: The Weekly
- Yearbook: The Record
- School fees: $520–$3,690
- Tuition: $45,570 (Pre-kindergarten–5th) $49,900 (6th–12th)
- Website: www.fwparker.org

The Francis W. Parker School is a private school in Chicago, Illinois, serving students from pre-kindergarten through twelfth grade. Located in Chicago's Lincoln Park neighborhood, the school is based on the progressive education philosophies of John Dewey and Colonel Francis Wayland Parker, emphasizing community and citizenship. Tuition and fees range from $45,570 to $49,900.

== History ==
In 1899, Anita McCormick Blaine, interested in the unconventional education philosophy of Francis Wayland Parker, convinced him to establish an independent school in Chicago's North Side with her financial backing.

Founded in 1901, Parker boasts the first official parents' association as well as one of the first school newspapers to be written, typeset, and printed by students: The Parker Weekly, which began publishing in 1911.

Parker has 946 students, and has undergone considerable physical renovation between 2000 and 2009. Parker added an AstroTurf field which started construction in June 2012, and it was finished in September 2012. During the 2008–09 school year, the Auditorium was completely renovated, with new classrooms, more seating, office space and a balcony. In the 2016–17 school year, renovation began for the new Kovler family library. The new library includes a balcony, reading nooks, a Lego table, and movable bookshelves.

Parker school formerly published Schools: Studies in Education, a national education journal featuring the narrative and analytic reflections of educators and students nationwide.

== Student activities ==
=== Athletics ===
Parker is part of the Independent School League (ISL) athletic conference, and its team name is the Colonel named after the school's founder, Colonel Francis Wayland Parker. In addition to Parker's colonel mascot, a new eagle mascot nicknamed "the Eagle" was introduced as an additional mascot as a way to better connect with younger students.

== Notable alumni ==
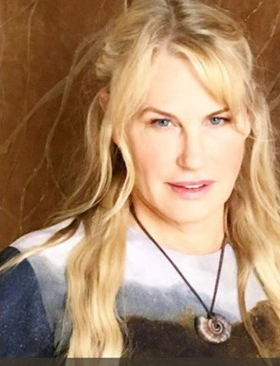
Daryl Hannah

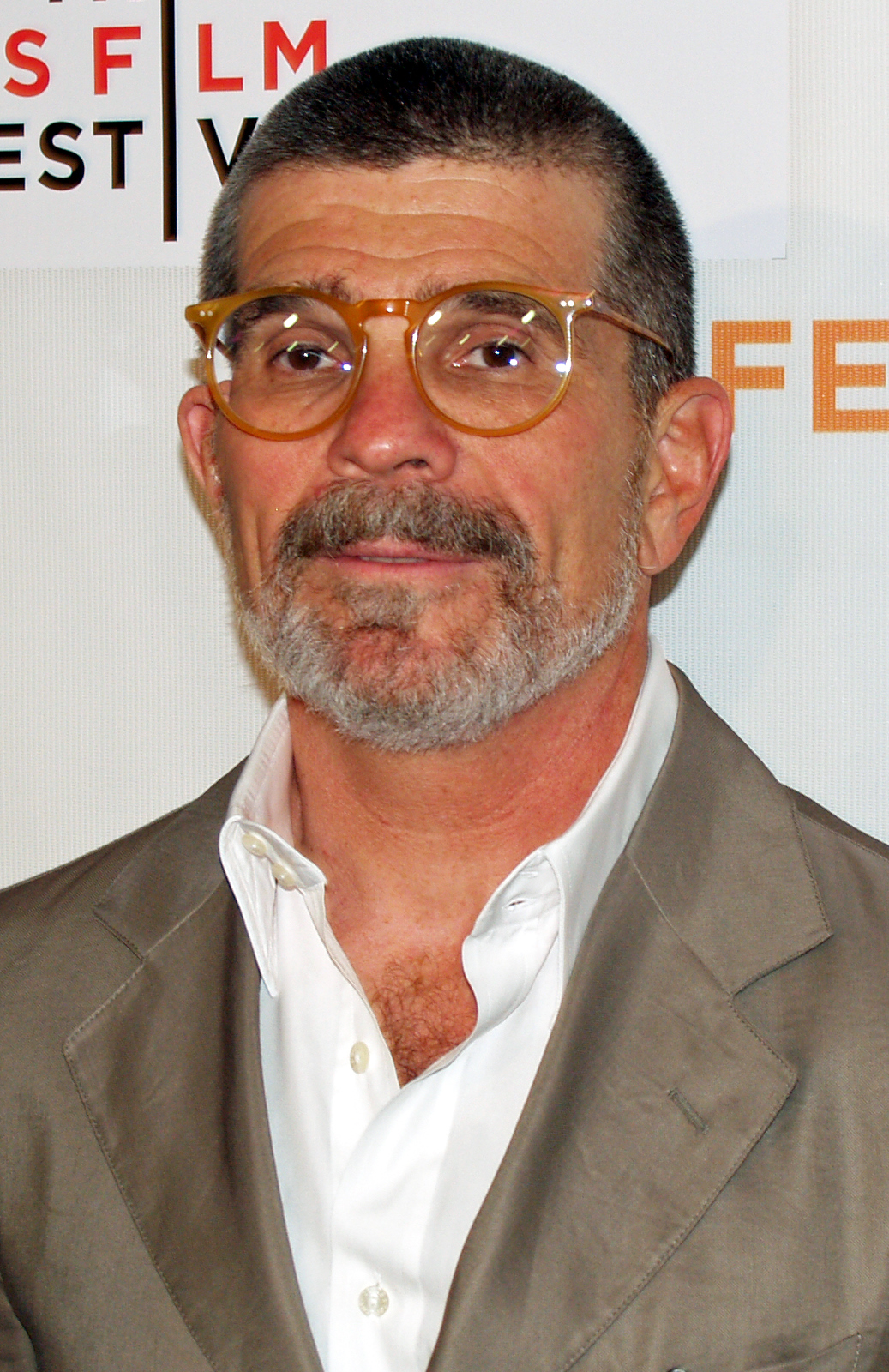
David Mamet

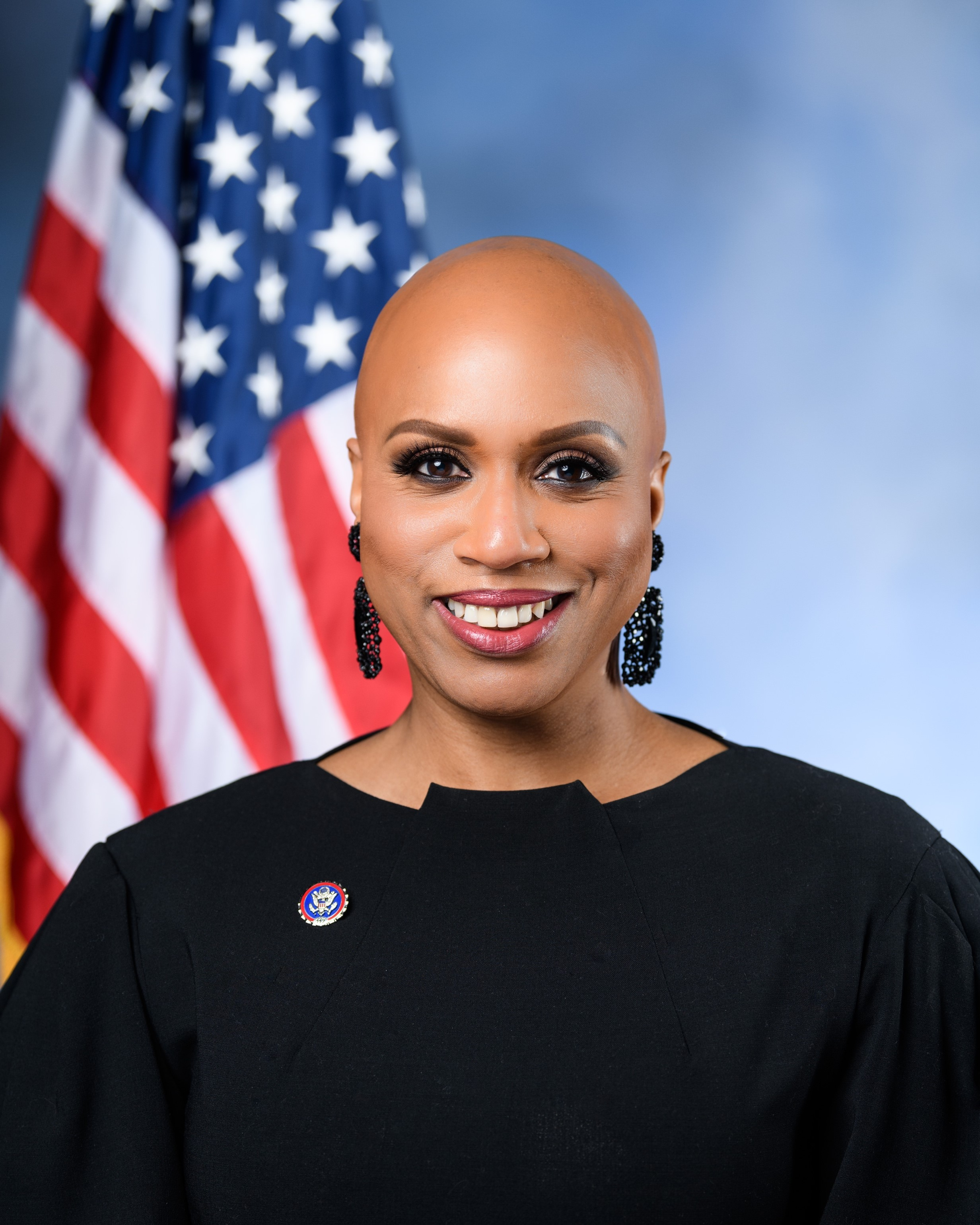
Ayanna Pressley

- Robert McCormick Adams Jr. – anthropologist
- Paul Adelstein – actor (Prison Break, Private Practice, Intolerable Cruelty)
- Jonathan Alter – journalist, author, and editor for Newsweek
- Jennifer Beals – actress (Flashdance, Devil in a Blue Dress, The L Word)
- Natalie Bergman – singer-songwriter
- Margaret Bonds – composer, pianist, and activist
- Leslie Buchbinder – documentary filmmaker
- Seth Caplan – film producer
- Sir Henry Channon – member of parliament (U.K.) and diarist
- Gordon Davis – lawyer and civic leader
- Carl Diehl – college football player
- Bobby Florsheim – screenwriter
- Eric Forsberg – filmmaker
- Matt Friend – comedian
- Chuck Gelatka – professional football player
- Edward Gorey – writer and illustrator
- Virginia Graham – talk show host
- Justin Hall – pioneer blogger
- Daryl Hannah – actress (Blade Runner, Splash, Kill Bill: Volume 1, Kill Bill: Volume 2)
- Sarah Haskins – comedian
- Anne Heche – actress (Donnie Brasco, Psycho, Six Days, Seven Nights)
- Katharine Holabird – author
- Celeste Holm – Oscar-winning actress (Gentleman's Agreement, Come to the Stable, All About Eve)
- Arnold Horween – professional football player
- Ralph Horween – professional football player
- Peter Jacobson – actor (House, Colony)
- Ian Keith – actor (The Big Trail)
- Eric Klinenberg – sociologist and author
- Karyn Kupcinet – actress
- Amy Landecker – actress (Transparent)
- Kate Levant – artist
- Ellen Lewis – casting director (Goodfellas, A League of Their Own, The Devil Wears Prada, The Wolf of Wall Street)
- Ron Lieber – journalist
- Eugene Lipov – physician and medical researcher
- Kevin A. Lynch – urban planner and author
- Jeff Lyon – journalist and Pulitzer Prize winner
- Arthur Maling – author
- David Mamet – playwright (Glengarry Glen Ross), author, and screenwriter (The Verdict, Wag the Dog)
- Joan Mitchell – artist best known for her painting in the abstract expressionism movement
- NeonSeon – author
- Wiley Nickel, former U.S. congressman and North Carolina state senator
- Elise Paschen – poet
- Alicia Patterson – editor and publisher
- Harriet Pattison – landscape architect
- Edith Pattou – author
- Alan Pierson – conductor, co-founder of the Alarm Will Sound ensemble, Artistic Director of the Brooklyn Philharmonic
- Mark Pincus – founder of social game company Zynga
- Ayanna Pressley – U.S. congresswoman
- Jay Pritzker – entrepreneur
- Jennifer Pritzker – founder of the Pritzker Military Museum & Library, first and only known transgender billionaire, member of the Pritzker family
- Sue Pritzker – socialite, activist, and philanthropist
- Barney Rosset – entrepreneur, publisher
- Dorothea Rudnick – embryologist
- Jeremy Sisto – actor
- Dave Specter – blues and jazz guitarist
- Brad Thor – author
- Ping Tom – civic leader
- Carleton Washburne – educator and author
- Jacob Weisberg – journalist and editor of Slate
- Joe Weisberg – television show creator (The Americans, The Patient)
- Jordan Weisman – founder of FASA & WizKids
- Haskell Wexler – cinematographer (Who's Afraid of Virginia Woolf?, Bound for Glory)
- Jim White – professional football player
- Hillary Wolf – child actress and two-time U.S. Olympian in judo
- Billy Zane – actor (Back to the Future, Dead Calm, Titanic)
- Lisa Zane – actress and vocalist

== Controversies ==
=== Project Veritas video ===
In 2022, the school drew national attention after Project Veritas released a secretly recorded video of a dean discussing optional sex-education programming that included LGBTQ+ health topics. The video prompted criticism from conservative groups and protests outside the school. Administrators stated that the footage was deceptively edited and that the programming was optional and age-appropriate, and reported increased security following the incident.

=== Athletic field lighting dispute ===
The school has been involved in a dispute with nearby residents over lighting at its athletic field in the Lincoln Park neighborhood. Opponents cited concerns about noise, traffic, and light pollution, while the school argued the lights were necessary for athletics and student safety. The disagreement led to zoning and legal challenges.
