= Leslie Buchbinder =

American filmmaker

Leslie Buchbinder is a Chicago-based documentary filmmaker and founder of Pentimenti Productions, a not-for-profit organization founded in 2010 that produces educational documentary films focused on visual arts. Buchbinder is most known for her directorial debut film, Hairy Who and the Chicago Imagists, which has received laudatory national & international press coverage. She also serves on the Committee on Prints and Drawings of the Art Institute of Chicago and the advisory board of the Chicago Film Archives.

After attending the Francis W. Parker School of Chicago, Buchbinder studied English literature as an undergraduate at Northwestern University, and later returned to the university for postgraduate work in performance studies. Buchbinder danced professionally with companies in Chicago & San Francisco, as well as acted & sang at the One Act Theatre Company, SF, where she & the cast of the original musical, "The Dead End Kid", were awarded Best Ensemble by Drama-Logue Magazine. Buchbinder moved to New York City, and transitioned into a career in arts public relations at The Kreisberg Group. After three years, she returned to Chicago and established her own arts communications company, LB-PR, whose clients included The Arts Club of Chicago, Marwen Foundation, The Israel Museum (Jerusalem), & Sara Lee Corporation, sponsor of exhibitions at The Art Institute of Chicago, the Museum of Contemporary Art Chicago, the Field Museum, among others.

In 2008, Buchbinder began her career as a documentary filmmaker, & in 2010, established Pentimenti Productions NFP. Her directorial debut was the award-winning film, "Hairy Who & The Chicago Imagists" (2014). Concurrent with the release of the film, Pentimenti launched a free online website, ChicagoImagists.com. She is currently in post-production for her second directorial feature - a film about artist H.C. Westermann, a sculptor, printmaker, (& acrobat). Filmed entirely in 3D, "H.C. Westermann: Memorial to the Idea of Man If He Was an Idea" will be released in 2021.

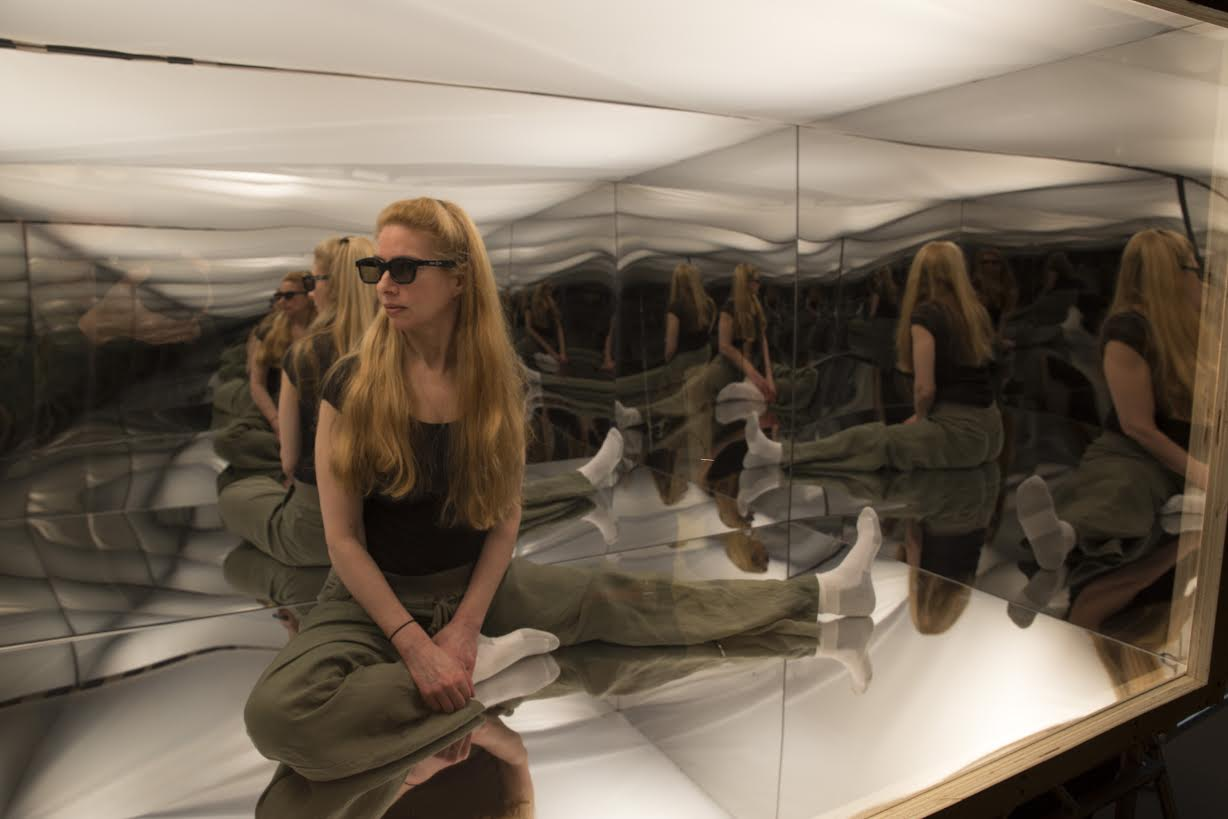
Leslie Buchbinder, is a Chicago-based documentary filmmaker
