= Quincy Method =

Educational method developed in 1875

The Quincy Method, also known as the Quincy Plan, or the Quincy system of learning, was a child-centered, progressive approach to education developed by Francis W. Parker, then superintendent of schools in Quincy, Massachusetts, United States, in 1875.

Parker, a pioneer of the progressive school movement, rejected the traditional rigid school routine, exemplified by rote learning and the spelling-book method, and even stated that the spelling book should be burned, although he did favor oral spelling. Emphasis was instead placed on social skills and self-expression through cultural activities and physical training, as well as teacher-prepared materials, experience-based learning and children's own writing.

A survey by the Massachusetts State Board of Education published four years later showed that Quincy students excelled at reading, writing, and spelling, and ranked fourth in their county in math.

Hundreds of visitors traveled to Quincy to observe the new methods, aiming to replicate them in their own schools. Many of Quincy’s teachers were recruited by districts in other states, spreading the Quincy method beyond Massachusetts to New Jersey, New York, Connecticut, Vermont, Florida, Minnesota, and other places.

When in 1883 Parker became principal of the Cook County Normal School in Chicago, he developed the method further, introducing teacher training based on modern educational methods.

== See also ==
- Constructionist learning
- Experiential education
- Educational philosophies
- Education reform
- Humanistic education
- Laboratory school
