= Progressive education =

Pedagogical movement

Progressive education, or educational progressivism, is a pedagogical movement that began in the late 19th century and has persisted in various forms to the present. In Europe, progressive education took the form of the New Education Movement. The term progressive was used to distinguish this education from the traditional curricula of the 19th century, which were rooted in classical preparation for the early-industrial university and strongly differentiated by social class. By contrast, progressive education finds its roots in modern, post-industrial experience. Most progressive education programs have these qualities in common:

- Emphasis on learning by doing – hands-on projects, expeditionary learning, experiential learning
- Integrated curriculum focused on thematic units
- Strong emphasis on problem solving and critical thinking
- Group work and development of social skills
- Understanding and action as the goals of learning as opposed to rote knowledge
- Collaborative and cooperative learning projects
- Education for social responsibility and democracy
- Integration of community service and service learning projects into the daily curriculum
- Selection of subject content by looking forward to asking what skills will be needed in future society
- De-emphasis on textbooks in favour of varied learning resources
- Emphasis on lifelong learning and social skills
- Assessment by evaluation of the child's projects and productions

== History ==
Progressive education can be traced back to the works of John Locke and Jean-Jacques Rousseau, both of whom are known as forerunners of ideas that would be developed by theorists such as John Dewey. Considered one of the first of the British empiricists, Locke believed that "truth and knowledge… arise out of observation and experience rather than manipulation of accepted or given ideas". He also discussed the need for children to have concrete experiences to learn. Rousseau deepened this line of thinking in Emile, or On Education, where he argued that subordinating students to teachers and memorising facts would not lead to an education.

=== Johann Bernhard Basedow ===
In Germany, Johann Bernhard Basedow (1724–1790) established the Philanthropinum at Dessau in 1774. He developed new teaching methods based on conversation and play with the child, and a program of physical development. Such was his success that he wrote a treatise on his methods, "On the best and hitherto unknown method of teaching children of noblemen".

=== Christian Gotthilf Salzmann ===
Christian Gotthilf Salzmann (1744–1811) was the founder of the Schnepfenthal institution, a school dedicated to new modes of education (derived heavily from the ideas of Jean-Jacques Rousseau). He wrote Elements of Morality, for the Use of Children, one of the first books translated into English by Mary Wollstonecraft.

=== Johann Heinrich Pestalozzi ===
Johann Heinrich Pestalozzi (1746–1827) was a Swiss pedagogue and educational reformer who exemplified Romanticism in his approach. He founded several educational institutions both in German- and French-speaking regions of Switzerland and wrote many works explaining his revolutionary modern principles of education. His motto was "Learning by head, hand and heart". His research and theories closely resemble those outlined by Rousseau in Emile. He is further considered by many to be the "father of modern educational science" His psychological theories pertain to education as they focus on the development of object teaching; that is, he felt that individuals best learned through experiences and through a direct manipulation and experience of objects. He further speculated that children learn through internal motivation rather than compulsion. (See Intrinsic vs. Extrinsic motivation). A teacher's task will be to help guide their students as individuals through their learning and allow it to unfold naturally.

=== Friedrich Fröbel ===
Friedrich Wilhelm August Fröbel (1782–1852) was a student of Pestalozzi who laid the foundation for modern education based on the recognition that children have unique needs and capabilities. He believed in "self-activity" and play as essential factors in child education. The teacher's role was not to indoctrinate but to encourage self-expression through play, both individually and in group activities. He created the concept of kindergarten.

=== Johann Friedrich Herbart ===
Johann Friedrich Herbart (1776–1841) emphasised the connection between individual development and the resulting societal contribution. His concept of individual maturation comprised five key ideas: Inner Freedom, Perfection, Benevolence, Justice, and Equity or Recompense. According to Herbart, abilities were not innate but could be instilled, so a thorough education could provide the framework for moral and intellectual development. In order to develop a child to lead to a consciousness of social responsibility, Herbart advocated that teachers utilize a methodology with five formal steps: "Using this structure a teacher prepared a topic of interest to the children, presented that topic, and questioned them inductively, so that they reached new knowledge based on what they had already known, looked back, and deductively summed up the lesson's achievements, then related them to moral precepts for daily living".

=== John Melchior Bosco ===
John Melchior Bosco (1815–1888) was concerned about the education of street children who had left their villages to find work in the rapidly industrialised city of Turin, Italy. Exploited as cheap labour or imprisoned for unruly behaviour, Bosco saw the need to create a space where they would feel at home. He called it an 'Oratory' where they could play, learn, share friendships, express themselves, develop their creative talents and pick up skills for gainful self-employment. With those who had found work, he set up a mutual-fund society (an early version of the Grameen Bank) to teach them the benefits of saving and self-reliance. The principles underlying his educational method, which won over the hearts and minds of thousands of youth who flocked to his oratory, were: 'be reasonable', 'be kind', 'believe' and 'be generous in service'. Today his method of education is practised in nearly 3000 institutions set up around the world by the members of the Salesian Society he founded in 1873.

=== Cecil Reddie ===
While studying for his doctorate in Göttingen in 1882–1883, Cecil Reddie was greatly impressed by the progressive educational theories being applied there. Reddie founded Abbotsholme School in Derbyshire, England, in 1889. Its curriculum put progressive educational ideas into practice. Reddie rejected rote learning, classical languages and corporal punishment. He combined modern languages, science, and the arts with a program of physical exercise, manual labour, recreation, crafts, and arts. Schools modelling themselves after Abbotsholme were established throughout Europe, and the model was particularly influential in Germany. Reddie often engaged foreign teachers, who learned its practices, before returning home to start their own schools. Hermann Lietz an Abbotsholme teacher founded five schools (Landerziehungsheime für Jungen) on Abbotsholme's principles. Other people he influenced included Kurt Hahn, Adolphe Ferrière and Edmond Demolins. His ideas also reached Japan, where it turned into "Taisho-era Free Education Movement" (Taisho Jiyu Kyoiku Undo)

=== John Dewey ===
Education according to John Dewey is the "participation of the individual in the social consciousness of the race" (Dewey, 1897, para. 1). As such, education should take into account that the student is a social being. The process begins at birth with the child unconsciously gaining knowledge and gradually developing their knowledge to share and partake in society.

For Dewey, education, which regulates "the process of coming to share in the social consciousness," is the "only sure" method of ensuring social progress and reform (Dewey, 1897, para. 60). In this respect, Dewey foreshadows Social Reconstructionism, whereby schools are a means to reconstruct society. As schools become a means for social reconstruction, they must be given the proper equipment to perform this task and guide their students.

=== Helen Parkhurst ===
The American teacher Helen Parkhurst (1886–1973) developed the Dalton Plan at the beginning of the twentieth century with the goal of reforming the then current pedagogy and classroom management. She wanted to break the teacher-centered lockstep teaching. During her first experiment, which she implemented in a small elementary school as a young teacher in 1904, she noticed that when students are given freedom for self-direction and self-pacing and to help one another, their motivation increases considerably and they learn more. In a later experiment in 1911 and 1912, Parkhurst re-organized the education in a large school for nine- to fourteen-year-olds. Instead of each grade, each subject was appointed its own teacher and its own classroom. The subject teachers made assignments: they converted the subject matter for each grade into learning assignments. In this way, learning became the students' own work; they could carry out their work independently, work at their own pace and plan their work themselves. The classroom turned into a laboratory, a place where students are working, furnished and equipped as work spaces, tailored to meet the requirements of specific subjects. Useful and attractive learning materials, instruments and reference books were put within the students' reach. The benches were replaced by large tables to facilitate co-operation and group instruction. This second experiment formed the basis for the next experiments, those in Dalton and New York, from 1919 onwards. The only addition was the use of graphs, charts enabling students to keep track of their own progress in each subject.

In the nineteen-twenties and nineteen-thirties, Dalton education spread throughout the world. There is no certainty regarding the exact numbers of Dalton schools, but there was Dalton education in America, Australia, England, Germany, the Netherlands, the Soviet Union, India, China and Japan.

=== Rudolf Steiner ===
Rudolf Steiner (1861–1925) first described the principles of what was to become Waldorf education in 1907. He established a series of schools based on these principles beginning in 1919. The focus of the education is on creating a developmentally appropriate curriculum that holistically integrates practical, artistic, social, and academic experiences. There are more than a thousand schools and many more early childhood centers worldwide; it has also become a popular form of homeschooling.

=== Maria Montessori ===
Maria Montessori (1870–1952) began to develop her philosophy and methods in 1897. She based her work on her observations of children and experimentation with the environment, materials, and lessons available to them. She frequently referred to her work as "scientific pedagogy", arguing for the need to go beyond observation and measurement of students, to developing new methods to transform them. Although Montessori education spread to the United States in 1911 there were conflicts with the American educational establishment and was opposed by William Heard Kilpatrick. However Montessori education returned to the United States in 1960 and has since spread to thousands of schools there.

In 1914 the Montessori Society in England organised its first conference. Hosted by Rev Bertram Hawker, who had set up, in partnership with his local elementary school in the Norfolk coastal village of East Runton, the first Montessori School in England. Pictures of this school, and its children, illustrated the 'Montessori's Own Handbook' (1914). Hawker had been impressed by his visit to Montessori's Casa dei Bambini in Rome, he gave numerous talks on Montessori's work after 1912, assisting in generating a national interest in her work. He organised the Montessori Conference 1914 in partnership with Edmond Holmes, ex-Chief Inspector of Schools, who had written a government report on Montessori. The conference decided that its remit was to promote the 'liberation of the child in the school', and though inspired by Montessori, would encourage, support and network teachers and educationalists who sought, through their schools and methods, that aim. They changed their name the following year to New Ideals in Education. Each subsequent conference was opened with reference to its history and origin as a Montessori Conference recognising her inspiration; reports italicized the members of the Montessori Society in the delegate lists; and numerous further events included Montessori methods and case studies. Montessori, through New Ideals in Education, its committee and members, events and publications, greatly influenced progressive state education in England.

=== Robert Baden-Powell ===
In July 1906, Ernest Thompson Seton sent Robert Baden-Powell a copy of his book The Birchbark Roll of the Woodcraft Indians. Seton was a British-born Canadian-American living in the United States. They shared ideas about youth training programs. In 1907 Baden-Powell wrote a draft called Boy Patrols. In the same year, to test his ideas, he gathered 21 boys of mixed social backgrounds and held a week-long camp in August on Brownsea Island in England. His organizational method, now known as the Patrol System and a key part of Scouting training, allowed the boys to organize themselves into small groups with an elected patrol leader. Baden Powell then wrote Scouting for Boys (London, 1908). The Brownsea camp and the publication of Scouting for Boys are generally regarded as the start of the Scout movement which spread throughout the world. Baden-Powell and his sister Agnes Baden-Powell introduced the Girl Guides in 1910.

=== Comparison with traditional education ===
Traditional education uses extrinsic motivation, such as grades and prizes. Progressive education is more likely to use intrinsic motivation, basing activities on the interests of the child. Praise may be discouraged as a motivator. Progressive education is a response to traditional methods of teaching. It is defined as an educational movement which gives more value to experience than formal learning. It is based more on experiential learning that concentrate on the development of a child's talents.

=== 21st century skills ===
21st century skills are a series of higher-order skills, abilities, and learning dispositions that have been identified as being required for success in the rapidly changing, digital society and workplaces. Many of these skills are also defining qualities of progressive education as well as being associated with deeper learning, which is based on mastering skills such as analytic reasoning, complex problem solving, and teamwork. These skills differ from traditional academic skills in that they are not primarily content knowledge-based. The focus of progressive pedagogies on fostering 21st-century skills may also explain why these schools maintain their appeal, particularly among a segment of highly-educated, middle-class parents.

== In the West ==
=== Germany ===
Hermann Lietz founded three Landerziehungsheime (country boarding schools) in 1904 based on Reddie's model for boys of different ages. Lietz eventually succeeded in establishing five more Landerziehungsheime. Edith and Paul Geheeb founded Odenwaldschule in Heppenheim in the Odenwald in 1910 using their concept of progressive education, which integrated the work of the head and hand.

=== Poland ===
Janusz Korczak was one notable follower and developer of Pestalozzi's ideas. He wrote The names of Pestalozzi, Froebel and Spencer shine with no less brilliance than the names of the greatest inventors of the twentieth century. For they discovered more than the unknown forces of nature; they discovered the unknown half of humanity: children. His Orphan's Home in Warsaw became a model institution and exerted influence on the educational process in other orphanages of the same type.

=== Ireland ===
The Quaker school run in Ballitore, Co Kildare in the 18th century had students from as far away as Bordeaux (where there was a substantial Irish émigré population), the Caribbean and Norway. Notable pupils included Edmund Burke and Napper Tandy. Sgoil Éanna, or in English St Enda's was founded in 1908 by Pádraig Pearse on Montessori principles. Its former assistant headmaster Thomas MacDonagh and other teachers including Pearse; games master Con Colbert; Pearse's brother, Willie, the art teacher, and Joseph Plunkett, and occasional lecturer in English, were executed by the British after the 1916 Rising. Pearse and MacDonagh were two of the seven leaders who signed the Irish Declaration of Independence. Pearse's book The Murder Machine was a denunciation of the English school system of the time and a declaration of his own educational principles. Apart from these examples of progressive education, however, during the decades after the advent of national independence in 1922, Irish educational policy makers generally rejected progressive ideas, focusing instead on curricula and teaching methods that reflected the new country's Catholic heritage and nationalist ethos up until the 1960s.

=== Sweden ===
In Sweden, an early proponent of progressive education was Alva Myrdal, who with her husband Gunnar co-wrote Kris i befolkningsfrågan (1934), a most influential program for the social-democratic hegemony (1932–1976) popularly known as "Folkhemmet". School reforms went through government reports in the 1940s and trials in the 1950s, resulting in the introduction in 1962 of public comprehensive schools ("grundskola") instead of the previously separated parallel schools for theoretical and non-theoretical education.

=== United Kingdom ===
The ideas from Reddie's Abbotsholme spread to schools such as Bedales School (1893), King Alfred School, London (1898) and St Christopher School, Letchworth (1915), as well as all the Friends' schools, Steiner Waldorf schools and those belonging to the Round Square Conference. The King Alfred School was radical for its time in that it provided a secular education and that boys and girls were educated together. Alexander Sutherland Neill believed children should achieve self-determination and should be encouraged to think critically rather than blindly obeying. He implemented his ideas with the founding of Summerhill School in 1921. Neill believed that children learn better when they are not compelled to attend lessons. The school was also managed democratically, with regular meetings to determine school rules. Pupils had equal voting rights with school staff.

=== United States ===
==== Early practitioners ====
Fröbel's student Margarethe Schurz founded the first kindergarten in the United States at Watertown, Wisconsin, in 1856, and she also inspired Elizabeth Peabody, who went on to found the first English-speaking kindergarten in the United States – the language at Schurz's kindergarten had been German, to serve an immigrant community – in Boston in 1860. This paved the way for the concept's spread in the USA. The German émigré Adolph Douai had also founded a kindergarten in Boston in 1859, but was obliged to close it after only a year. By 1866, however, he was founding others in New York City.

William Heard Kilpatrick (1871–1965) was a pupil of Dewey and one of the most effective practitioners of the concept as well as the more adept at proliferating the progressive education movement and spreading word of the works of Dewey. He is especially well known for his "project method of teaching". This developed the progressive education notion that students were to be engaged and taught so that their knowledge may be directed to society for a socially useful need. Like Dewey he also felt that students should be actively engaged in their learning rather than actively disengaged with the simple reading and regurgitation of material.

The most famous early practitioner of progressive education was Francis Parker; its best-known spokesperson was the philosopher John Dewey. In 1875 Francis Parker became superintendent of schools in Quincy, Massachusetts, after spending two years in Germany studying emerging educational trends on the continent. Parker was opposed to rote learning, believing that there was no value in knowledge without understanding. He argued instead schools should encourage and respect the child's creativity. Parker's Quincy System called for child-centered and experience-based learning. He replaced the traditional curriculum with integrated learning units based on core themes related to the knowledge of different disciplines. He replaced traditional readers, spellers and grammar books with children's own writing, literature, and teacher prepared materials. In 1883 Parker left Massachusetts to become Principal of the Cook County Normal School in Chicago, a school that also served to train teachers in Parker's methods. In 1894 Parker's Talks on Pedagogics, which drew heavily on the thinking of Fröbel, Pestalozzi and Herbart, became one of the first American writings on education to gain international fame.

That same year, philosopher John Dewey moved from the University of Michigan to the newly established University of Chicago where he became chair of the department of philosophy, psychology and education. He and his wife enrolled their children in Parker's school before founding their own school two years later.

Whereas Parker started with practice and then moved to theory, Dewey began with hypotheses and then devised methods and curricula to test them. By the time Dewey moved to Chicago at the age of thirty-five, he had already published two books on psychology and applied psychology. He had become dissatisfied with philosophy as pure speculation and was seeking ways to make philosophy directly relevant to practical issues. Moving away from an early interest in Hegel, Dewey proceeded to reject all forms of dualism and dichotomy in favor of a philosophy of experience as a series of unified wholes in which everything can be ultimately related.

In 1896, John Dewey opened what he called the laboratory school to test his theories and their sociological implications. With Dewey as the director and his wife as principal, the University of Chicago Laboratory school, was dedicated "to discover in administration, selection of subject-matter, methods of learning, teaching, and discipline, how a school could become a cooperative community while developing in individuals their own capacities and satisfy their own needs." (Cremin, 136) For Dewey the two key goals of developing a cooperative community and developing individuals' own capacities were not at odds; they were necessary to each other. This unity of purpose lies at the heart of the progressive education philosophy. In 1912, Dewey sent out students of his philosophy to found The Park School of Buffalo and The Park School of Baltimore to put it into practice. These schools operate to this day within a similar progressive approach.

At Columbia, Dewey worked with other educators such as Charles Eliot and Abraham Flexner to help bring progressivism into the mainstream of American education. In 1917 Columbia established the Lincoln School of Teachers College "as a laboratory for the working out of an elementary and secondary curriculum which shall eliminate obsolete material and endeavor to work up in usable form material adapted to the needs of modern living." (Cremin, 282) Based on Flexner's demand that the modern curriculum "include nothing for which an affirmative case can not be made out" (Cremin, 281) the new school organized its activities around four fundamental fields: science, industry, aesthetics and civics. The Lincoln School built its curriculum around "units of work" that reorganized traditional subject matter into forms embracing the development of children and the changing needs of adult life. The first and second grades carried on a study of community life in which they actually built a city. A third grade project growing out of the day-to-day life of the nearby Hudson River became one of the most celebrated units of the school, a unit on boats, which under the guidance of its legendary teacher Miss Curtis, became an entrée into history, geography, reading, writing, arithmetic, science, art and literature. Each of the units was broadly enough conceived so that different children could concentrate on different aspects depending on their own interests and needs. Each of the units called for widely diverse student activities, and each sought to deal in depth with some critical aspect of contemporary civilization. Finally each unit engaged children working together cooperatively and also provided opportunities for individual research and exploration.

In 1924, Agnes de Lima, the lead writer on education for The New Republic and The Nation, published a collection of her articles on progressive education as a book, titled Our Enemy the Child.

In 1918, the National Education Association, representing superintendents and administrators in smaller districts across the country, issued its report "Cardinal Principles of Secondary Education." It emphasized the education of students in terms of health, a command of fundamental processes, worthy home membership, vocation, citizenship, worthy use of leisure, and ethical character. They emphasized life adjustment and reflected the social efficiency model of progressive education.

From 1919 to 1955, the Progressive Education Association founded by Stanwood Cobb and others worked to promote a more student-centered approach to education. During the Great Depression the organization conducted the Eight-Year Study, evaluating the effects of progressive programs. More than 1500 students over four years were compared to an equal number of carefully matched students at conventional schools. When they reached college, the experimental students were found to equal or surpass traditionally educated students on all outcomes: grades, extracurricular participation, dropout rates, intellectual curiosity, and resourcefulness. Moreover, the study found that the more the school departed from the traditional college preparatory program, the better was the record of the graduates. (Kohn, Schools, 232)

By mid-century, many public school programs had also adopted elements of progressive curriculum. At mid-century Dewey believed that progressive education had "not really penetrated and permeated the foundations of the educational institution."(Kohn, Schools, 6,7) As the influence of progressive pedagogy grew broader and more diffuse, practitioners began to vary their application of progressive principles. As varying interpretations and practices made evaluation of progressive reforms more difficult to assess, critics began to propose alternative approaches.

The seeds of the debate over progressive education can be seen in the differences of Parker and Dewey. These have to do with how much and by whom curriculum should be worked out from grade to grade, how much the child's emerging interests should determine classroom activities, the importance of child-centered vs. societal–centered learning, the relationship of community building to individual growth, and especially the relationship between emotion, thought and experience.

In 1955, the publication of Rudolf Flesch's Why Johnny Can't Read leveled criticism of reading programs at the progressive emphasis on reading in context. The conservative McCarthy era raised questions about the liberal ideas at the roots of the progressive reforms. The launching of Sputnik in 1957 at the height of the Cold War gave rise to a number of intellectually competitive approaches to disciplinary knowledge, such as BSCS biology and PSSC physics, led by university professors such as Jerome Bruner and Jerrold Zacharias.

Some Cold War reforms incorporated elements of progressivism. For example, the work of Zacharias and Bruner was based in the developmental psychology of Jean Piaget and incorporated many of Dewey's ideas of experiential education. Bruner's analysis of developmental psychology became the core of a pedagogical movement known as constructivism, which argues that the child is an active participant in making meaning and must be engaged in the progress of education for learning to be effective. This psychological approach has deep connections to the work of both Parker and Dewey and led to a resurgence of their ideas in second half of the century.

In 1965, President Johnson inaugurated the Great Society and the Elementary and Secondary Education Act suffused public school programs with funds for sweeping education reforms. At the same time the influx of federal funding also gave rise to demands for accountability and the behavioral objectives approach of Robert F. Mager and others foreshadowed the No Child Left Behind Act passed in 2002. Against these critics eloquent spokespersons stepped forward in defense of the progressive tradition. The Open Classroom movement, led by Herb Kohl and George Dennison, recalled many of Parker's child centered reforms.

The late 1960s and early 1970s saw a rise and decline in the number of progressive schools. There were several reasons for the decline:

- Demographics: As the baby boom passed, traditional classrooms were no longer as over-enrolled, reducing demand for alternatives.
- The economy: The oil crisis and recession made shoestring schools less viable.
- Times changed: With the ending of the Vietnam War, social activism waned.
- Co-optation: Many schools were co-opted by people who didn't believe in the original mission.
- Centralization: The ongoing centralization of school districts
- Non-implementation: Schools failed to implement a model of shared governance
- Interpersonal dynamics: Disagreement over school goals, poor group process skills, lack of critical dialogue, and fear of assertive leadership

Progressive education has been viewed as an alternative to the test-oriented instruction legislated by the No Child Left Behind educational funding act. Alfie Kohn has been an outspoken critic of the No Child Left Behind Act and a passionate defender of the progressive tradition.

== In the East ==
=== India ===
Rabindranath Tagore (1861–1941) was one of the most effective practitioners of the concept of progressive education. He expanded Santiniketan, which is a small town near Bolpur in the Birbhum district of West Bengal, India, approximately 160 km north of Kolkata. He de-emphasized textbook learning in favor of varied learning resources from nature. The emphasis here was on self-motivation rather than on discipline, and on fostering intellectual curiosity rather than competitive excellence. There were courses on a great variety of cultures, and study programs devoted to China, Japan, and the Middle East. He was of the view that education should be a "joyous exercise of our inventive and constructive energies that help us to build up character."

=== Japan ===
Seikatsu Tsuzurikata is a grassroots movement in Japan that has many parallels to the progressive education movement, but it developed completely independently, beginning in the late 1920s. The Japanese progressive educational movement was one of the stepping stones to the modernization of Japan and it has resonated down to the present.

== See also ==
- Active learning
- Alternative school
- Constructionist learning (Seymour Papert)
- Critical pedagogy
- Democratic education
- Educational philosophies
- Education reform
- Experiential education
- Laboratory school
- Learning by doing
- Learning by teaching (LdL)
- Learning environment
- Learning space
- Oswego Movement
- Passive learning
- Positive education
- Caroline Pratt
- Project Method
- Student-centred learning
- REEVO, alternative education organization and network
