= List of Boston Red Sox owners and executives =

This page is a list of the owners and executives of the Boston Red Sox.

The Boston Red Sox are an American professional baseball team based in Boston, Massachusetts. The Red Sox compete in Major League Baseball (MLB) as a member club of the American League (AL) East division. They have been a member of the American League since its inaugural season of 1901, playing their first seven seasons as the Boston Americans.

== Owners ==
=== Majority owners ===
Name	Years
Joseph C. Pelletier	1901
Charles Somers	1901–1903
Henry Killilea	1903–1904
John I. Taylor	April 19, 1904–September 1911
John I. Taylor & Jimmy McAleer	September 1911–December 21, 1913
John I. Taylor & Joseph Lannin	December 21, 1913–May 15, 1914
Joseph Lannin	May 15, 1914–November 2, 1916
Harry Frazee	November 2, 1916–August 2, 1923
Bob Quinn	August 2, 1923–February 25, 1933
Tom Yawkey	February 25, 1933–July 9, 1976
Jean R. Yawkey (with Buddy LeRoux and Haywood Sullivan)†	July 9, 1976–February 26, 1992
JRY Trust (John Harrington, CEO)	February 26, 1992–December 20, 2001
New England Sports Ventures / Fenway Sports Group (John W. Henry, majority owner)	December 20, 2001–present

† During the ownership tenure of Mrs. Jean R. Yawkey, Haywood Sullivan and Buddy LeRoux became general partners. A purchase of the team from the estate of Tom Yawkey was approved by the league in May 1978, resulting in each of Mrs. Yawkey, Sullivan, and LeRoux having a one-third controlling interest in the team as general partners. This stood until March 1987, when Yawkey bought out LeRoux, following a failed attempt by LeRoux to take control of the team. Mrs. Yawkey's majority ownership of the team passed upon her death in February 1992 to JRY Trust, which later bought out Sullivan in November 1993.

=== Minority owners ===
- Eddie Collins
- Thomas R. DiBenedetto
- Robert Drury
- John A. Kaneb
- Seth Klarman
- Buddy LeRoux
- Larry Lucchino
- George J. Mitchell
- Phillip H. Morse
- Les Otten
- Frank Resnek
- Samuel A. Tamposi
- Haywood Sullivan
- Jeffrey Vinik
- Tom Werner
- LeBron James
- Richard Warke

== Executives ==
=== Team presidents ===
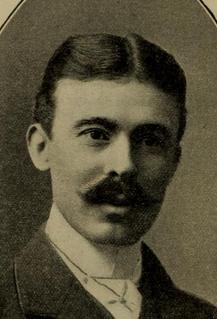
Charles Somers, second team president

Name	Years	Notes
Joseph C. Pelletier	1901	Concurrent with ownership
Charles Somers	1901–1903	Concurrent with ownership
Henry Killilea	1903–1904	Concurrent with ownership
John I. Taylor	1904–1911	Concurrent with sole ownership
Jimmy McAleer	1911–1913	Concurrent with part ownership
Joseph Lannin	1913–1916	Concurrent with part then sole ownership
Harry Frazee	1916–1923	Concurrent with ownership
Bob Quinn	1923–1933	Concurrent with ownership
Tom Yawkey	1933–1976	Concurrent with ownership
Jean R. Yawkey	1976–1987	
John Harrington	1987–2001	First non-owner to serve as president
Larry Lucchino	2002–2015	Served through end of 2015 season
Sam Kennedy	2015–present	Began tenure after 2015 season

=== Heads of baseball operations ===
The team has used different titles for the person superior to a general manager.

Name	Years	Title
Dave Dombrowski	2015–2019	President of Baseball Operations
Chaim Bloom	2020–2023	Chief Baseball Officer
Brian O'Halloran	2023–present	Executive Vice President of Baseball Operations
Craig Breslow	2023–present	Chief Baseball Officer, President of Baseball Operations since 2027

=== General Managers ===
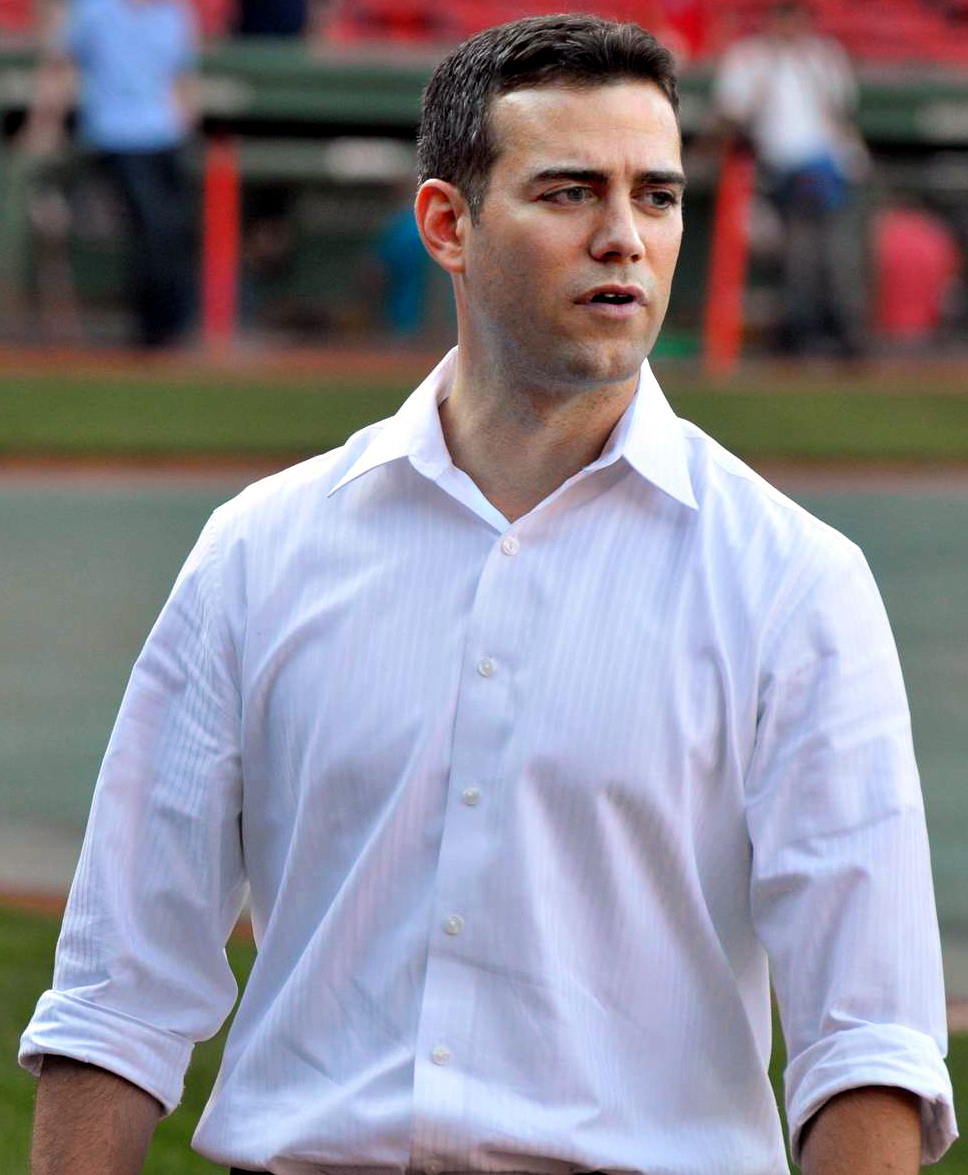
Theo Epstein, general manager when the team won the 2004 World Series

Name	Start date	End date	Ref.
Eddie Collins	February 25, 1933	September 29, 1947	
Joe Cronin	September 29, 1947	January 15, 1959	
Bucky Harris	January 15, 1959	September 27, 1960	
none	September 27, 1960	October 6, 1962	(Note: From September 27, 1960 to October 6, 1962, the duties usually held by a general manager were split between executive vice president Dick O'Connell, manager Pinky Higgins, and scouting director Neil Mahoney.)
Pinky Higgins	October 6, 1962	September 16, 1965	
Dick O'Connell	September 16, 1965	October 24, 1977	
Haywood Sullivan	October 24, 1977	June 5, 1984	
Lou Gorman	June 5, 1984	November 9, 1993	
Lou Gorman (acting)	November 9, 1993	January 27, 1994	
Dan Duquette	January 27, 1994	February 28, 2002	
Mike Port (acting)	February 28, 2002	November 25, 2002	
Theo Epstein	November 25, 2002	October 31, 2005	(Note: Theo Epstein briefly left the team during the 2005–06 offseason; the general manager position was initially vacant, then was jointly filled by Ben Cherington and Jed Hoyer until Epstein's return.)
none	October 31, 2005	December 12, 2005	
Ben Cherington & Jed Hoyer	December 12, 2005	January 25, 2006	
Theo Epstein	January 25, 2006	October 21, 2011	
none	October 21, 2011	October 25, 2011	
Ben Cherington	October 25, 2011	August 18, 2015	
none	August 18, 2015	September 24, 2015	
Mike Hazen	September 24, 2015	October 16, 2016	
none	October 16, 2016	October 2019	(Note: After Mike Hazen left the team in October 2016, president of baseball operations Dave Dombrowski was the de facto general manager, although he did not formally hold the title. The general manager position remained vacant until filled by Brian O'Halloran in October 2019.)
Brian O'Halloran	October 2019	September 2023	

=== Other executives ===
- John Alevizos
- Allard Baird
- Dick Bresciani
- Josh Byrnes
- John Claiborne
- George J. Digby
- Billy Evans
- David Howard
- Bill James
- Eddie Kasko
- Edward F. Kenney, Sr.
- Bill Lajoie
- Neil Mahoney
- Johnny Murphy
- Herb Pennock
- Bob Schaefer
- Craig Shipley
- Specs Toporcer
