= Rogers Badgett =

American philanthropist and businessman

Badgett

James Rogers Badgett Sr. (July 27, 1917 – June 6, 2005), sometimes spelled as Rodgers Badgett, was an American businessman involved in the construction, coal mining, oil and gas exploration, dredging, aviation, and automotive sales industries, and a key minority partner in the Boston Red Sox of Major League Baseball from 1978 through 1985. Born in Pettus, Arkansas, he graduated from Memphis' Messick High School and attended the University of Tennessee. He was a longtime resident of Madisonville, Kentucky.

He owned and operated Badgett Construction Company before World War II, and during the war he founded Badgett Mine Stripping Corporation, which mined bauxite in Missouri, then moved into the strip mining of coal in Kentucky's Hopkins and Muhlenberg counties. After the war, his construction and dredging company was involved in major projects throughout North America, such as the St. Lawrence Seaway, and globally, in Kuwait and the United Arab Emirates.

== Backed 1977 Red Sox ownership bid ==
In 1977, Badgett teamed with former Red Sox athletic trainer Buddy LeRoux—and, eventually, club vice president Haywood Sullivan—to create an ownership syndicate seeking to purchase the team from the estate of late owner Tom Yawkey. The LeRoux–Sullivan bid was successful, although the sale was not approved by the American League until May 23, 1978, when Yawkey's widow, Jean, joined the group herself. LeRoux, Sullivan and Mrs. Yawkey became general partners under the terms of the sale, with Badgett remaining a limited partner. However, he held 12 of the team's 30 limited partner shares and at one point he and LeRoux combined controlled 42 percent of Red Sox stock.

The ownership group soon clashed over the Red Sox' operating and fiscal policy, and ruptured publicly on June 6, 1983, when LeRoux (with Badgett's support) attempted to unseat Yawkey and Sullivan and take control of the team, a gambit nicknamed the "Coup LeRoux". After a year-long legal battle, Yawkey and Sullivan prevailed in June 1984. In the autumn of 1985, Yawkey acquired the limited partner shares held by Badgett and the LeRoux faction.

== Honors ==
Badgett received numerous honors and awards recognizing his business career and philanthropy, including "Coal Miner of the Year" from the Western Kentucky Coal Producers' Association, "Man of the Year" from the Lions Club and "Distinguished Eagle Scout" from the Boy Scouts of America. He died in Madisonville at age 87.
