= John Claiborne (baseball executive) =

John W. Claiborne III (born 1939) is a former front-office executive in American Major League Baseball who also was an early president of the New England Sports Network (NESN), a regional cable television network primarily (80 percent) owned by the Boston Red Sox that telecasts Red Sox baseball and Boston Bruins National Hockey League games.

Claiborne's baseball career began with the New York Mets and ended with the St. Louis Cardinals. After starting out in New York's farm system, he was the Cards' administrative assistant for minor leagues and scouting in 1970–72, and the general manager and chief operating officer of the Redbirds in 1978–80. In between, he was the farm system director of the Oakland Athletics in 1972–75 and the assistant general manager of the Red Sox in 1975–77.

Claiborne ran the A's farm system during the height of the A's dynasty under owner Charlie Finley. Finley served as his own general manager and had a phenomenal degree of success at the major league level with a roster that he had signed and groomed through the player development system. But by the mid-1970s, the talent pipeline began to dry up as Finley economised through slashing the number of scouts and minor league affiliates working on Oakland's behalf.

In August 1975, Claiborne resigned his Oakland post. He then joined the Red Sox as a special assignment scout, evaluating West Coast-based teams at the major league level. When Boston won the American League East Division and faced the three-time defending world champion Athletics in the 1975 American League Championship Series, Claiborne's scouting report was a critical factor in Boston's stunning three-game sweep. At season's end, he was promoted to chief aide to Bosox general manager Dick O'Connell.

Claiborne drew positive notices for his work in the Boston front office, but when longtime owner Tom Yawkey's death forced a sale of the team in 1977, O'Connell and his top assistants, including Claiborne, were fired by Yawkey's widow, Jean, to make way for a new ownership/management team. Reportedly, some of the unsuccessful bidders for the Boston franchise were considering hiring Claiborne as O'Connell's successor.

Less than a year later, however, Claiborne returned to St. Louis to take over the Cardinals' front office. He ran the Redbirds from the end of the 1978 campaign to the middle of 1980, a period of transition during which the Cardinals hired Whitey Herzog as field manager. When Herzog's hiring on June 9, 1980, did not produce immediate results, he was given additional duties as general manager and Claiborne was fired on August 18 of the same year. Eventually, Herzog would make trades for players such as Ozzie Smith who would lead to St. Louis' three National League pennants during the 1980s.

Claiborne eventually returned to Boston to serve as president of the fledgling NESN, which has grown to become a powerful regional sports network.

In 2002, Claiborne was hired by the Baltimore Orioles as the first ever employee of, and to start "Orioles Television", which was the group that produced over-the-air broadcasts of Orioles games, and was the precursor to the current Mid-Atlantic Sports Network (MASN)

Preceded by Bing Devine	St. Louis Cardinals General Manager; 1978–1980	Succeeded by Whitey Herzog
