= John Harrington (baseball) =

American business manager and baseball executive

- Born: July 12, 1936 (age 90); Boston, Massachusetts, U.S.
- Education: Boston College
- Occupations: Business manager; President of the Boston Red Sox (1987–2001); CEO of the Boston Red Sox (1994–2001); Chairman of the Yawkey Foundation (2007–present)
- Awards: Boston Red Sox Hall of Fame (2002)

John Leo Harrington (born July 12, 1936) is an American retired business manager and former executive in Major League Baseball (MLB). He was president of the Boston Red Sox from 1987 through 2001, also acting as CEO during much of the time the Red Sox were owned by the JRY Trust (1992–2001).

== Early life and career ==
Harrington graduated from Boston College in 1957, and received his MBA there in 1966. After college, he was an officer in the U.S. Navy, then worked for both the General Accounting Office and NASA. He eventually became an accounting professor at Boston College until 1970, where he was hired by Joe Cronin, president of the American League, to be the league's controller.

== Boston Red Sox ==
After Cronin retired, Harrington was hired by Red Sox owner Tom Yawkey as treasurer of the Red Sox. Yawkey died in 1976 and was eventually replaced by his wife Jean, who sold the team in 1977 to a syndicate headed by general partners Buddy LeRoux and Haywood Sullivan. To gain approval of the sale by the American League, Mrs. Yawkey joined the ownership group in 1978 as its third general partner and club president. Harrington left the team to work for Governor Edward King of Massachusetts and then for a Lloyd's of London insurance affiliate. But he eventually returned to the Red Sox in the mid-1980s, during a period of strife between LeRoux and his partners, and became an important advisor to Mrs. Yawkey. Harrington also became the first non-owner to be the team's president, a position he held during 1987–2001.

=== CEO ===
After Jean Yawkey's death in 1992, as trustee of the JRY Trust, Harrington arranged for the Trust to buy out the shares of Sullivan, the last remaining general partner. He completely overhauled the front office, bringing in general manager Dan Duquette from the Montreal Expos. Under Harrington's leadership the team compiled one of the best records in baseball; the team won the 1986 American League Championship Series; won the American League East division in 1986, 1988, 1990 and 1995; and won the Wild Card in 1998 and 1999.

Harrington was instrumental in acquiring Pedro Martínez, Manny Ramírez, Jason Varitek, Tim Wakefield, Johnny Damon, Derek Lowe and other stars. Harrington built a new spring training facility in Fort Myers, Florida, and broadened the reach and popularity of Red Sox majority-owned New England Sports Network (NESN). He was responsible for bringing the All-Star Game to Fenway Park in 1999. He also played key roles within Major League Baseball. He was the lead negotiator for baseball owners during the 1994–95 Major League Baseball strike, and led the development of both interleague play and the creation of the Wild Card playoff format.

==== Controversies ====
During Harrington's tenure, the Red Sox were also embroiled in several controversial episodes. In 1997, All-Star pitcher Roger Clemens acrimoniously left the team to sign as a free agent with the Toronto Blue Jays, where he won a fourth Cy Young Award.

Also in 1997, after infielder Wil Cordero was arrested on domestic assault charges, a half-dozen Red Sox front office members made a show of support on Cordero's behalf by appearing in court at his arraignment. Weeks later, Harrington initially refused to accept the terms of a negotiated settlement between the MLBPA players' union and the owners' Player Relations Committee to allow Cordero to return to the team. However, Harrington relented after the union threatened to file a grievance and owners' counsel advised him he was unlikely to prevail in court. Cordero's return drew criticism from women's rights advocates, and Cordero ultimately pleaded guilty to the charges after the season.

In December 1997, Harrington and the club faced charges of racial bias and harassment after a black former employee of the team claimed a framed photo of himself and his fiancee was defaced with a racial epithet. The following month, a civil rights advocate who offered to mediate a settlement for the club abandoned those efforts, accusing Harrington of rebuffing him and failing to deal in good faith. The case led to a hearing before the Massachusetts Commission Against Discrimination (MCAD) and was ultimately settled.

==== Ballpark ====
In 1999, Harrington proposed the idea of moving the Red Sox into a new ballpark that was scheduled to be built adjacent to Fenway and even named "New Fenway Park", (similar to what would happen to Yankee Stadium in 2008). This idea was wildly controversial, as many Red Sox fans consider Fenway "a national treasure" of sorts. Harrington was quoted as saying that, "It would be easier to fix the Leaning Tower of Pisa than Fenway". The team set aside $415 million of $545 million allotted for the new ballpark, with the public financing the rest, estimated at $130 million. The baseball world had seen the closure of Tiger Stadium that same year, and many hoped Fenway would avoid the same fate. After much outcry from the public, the team was sold prior to the 2002 season to an ownership group, New England Sports Ventures, headed by John W. Henry, Tom Werner and Larry Lucchino, bringing a close to Harrington's time with the Red Sox. (Note: Under this new ownership, Fenway Park was renovated, and the Red Sox celebrated the 100th anniversary of the ballpark on April 20, 2012.)

== Later life ==
Harrington has been chairman of the Yawkey Foundation since 2007.

Harrington was inducted to the Boston Red Sox Hall of Fame in 2002, and the Irish American Baseball Hall of Fame in 2019. In 2018, Boston College dedicated the Harrington Athletics Village at Brighton Fields, home of the college's softball and baseball fields, in his honor.

== Notes ==
Sporting positions
Preceded by Jean R. Yawkey	Boston Red Sox President; 1987–2001	Succeeded by Larry Lucchino
