= Neil Mahoney =

- Born: November 21, 1906
- Died: May 23, 1973 (aged 66)
- Occupation: Professional baseball scout

Neil T. Mahoney (November 21, 1906 – May 23, 1973) was an American professional baseball scout, scouting director, and player development official. Mahoney spent more than 30 years with the Boston Red Sox of Major League Baseball, and as director of minor league operations and director of player procurement, he played an instrumental role in Boston's 1967 and 1975 American League championships.

== Scout and college coach ==
A native of Newton, Massachusetts, Mahoney graduated with a business degree from Northeastern University in 1929, then played semi-professional baseball in New England, and one professional season (1934) as a catcher for the Watertown Townies and Lowell Hustlers of the Class B level Northeastern League. Mahoney was the player-manager for Harwich in the Cape Cod Baseball League in 1937 and 1938, and was an all-league selection at catcher, described as "a sterling player, a good throwing arm, a couple of speedy feet and a gentleman always."

He first joined the Red Sox as an area scout in 1939, but during World War II he became head baseball and basketball coach of Bowdoin College. After the war, he rejoined the Red Sox and during the 1950s was promoted to East Coast scouting supervisor. He signed New England players such as Jimmy Piersall, Walt Dropo and Wilbur Wood for Boston. He also signed University of Florida catcher Haywood Sullivan, who would succeed Mahoney as the Red Sox' scouting director in 1973 and later become general manager and part-owner of the Bosox.

== Scouting and farm system director ==
After a disappointing 1960 season, Red Sox owner Tom Yawkey made several changes in his front office. Among them, he replaced Johnny Murphy, the team's director of minor league operations and scouting, with Mahoney. Although the Red Sox continued to struggle at the MLB level through 1966, Mahoney's scouts and minor league farm system began producing players who would assume key roles in its 1967 "Impossible Dream" pennant drive: Jim Lonborg, George Scott, Rico Petrocelli, Tony Conigliaro, Reggie Smith, Joe Foy, Mike Andrews, Sparky Lyle and others. In addition, the system produced a future Baseball Hall of Fame manager, Dick Williams, who would lead Boston to the 1967 pennant; Williams had been given his first managing job, the Red Sox' Triple-A assignment, by Mahoney in 1965.

Mahoney, like general manager Dick O'Connell, also signaled a change in Red Sox policy by actively scouting and signing African American players. "Under O'Connell and Neil Mahoney, Boston's increasingly colorblind farm system had never been more productive," wrote Glenn Stout and Dick Johnson in their book, Red Sox Century.

== Legacy ==
After the 1968 season, Mahoney focused strictly on heading the team's scouting corps as director of player procurement, turning over farm system director responsibilities to his assistant, Ed Kenney. Before his death at age 66 in Chestnut Hill, Massachusetts, in 1973, however, Mahoney's scouts would produce Hall of Famers Carlton Fisk and Jim Rice, and other stars of Boston's 1975 pennant-winning team such as Rick Burleson, Dwight Evans, Cecil Cooper and Bill Lee.

A former baseball captain of the Northeastern Huskies, Neil Mahoney was inducted posthumously into the Northeastern University Athletics Hall of Fame in 1975.
