= JRY Trust =

American business entity that owned the Boston Red Sox

The JRY Trust (originally JRY Corporation) was an American trust that owned the Boston Red Sox franchise within Major League Baseball (MLB) from 1992 through 2001. JRY were the initials of Jean R. Yawkey, who had ownership of the team, in part or in whole, from the July 1976 death of her husband, Tom Yawkey, until her own death in February 1992.

Following the death of Mr. Yawkey, the team was legally owned by his estate, and Mrs. Yawkey succeeded him as team president. A purchase of the team from the estate was approved by the American League in May 1978, resulting in each of Mrs. Yawkey, Haywood Sullivan, and Buddy LeRoux having a one-third controlling interest in the team as general partners. JRY Corporation was created to hold legal ownership of the team. Following a failed attempt by LeRoux to take control of the team during the 1983 season, LeRoux sold his interest to Mrs. Yawkey in March 1987. Upon Mrs. Yawkey's death in February 1992, her holdings passed into the trust. Sullivan retained his interest until being bought out by the trust in November 1993.

The trust was headed by John Harrington, who also served as president of the Red Sox from 1987 to 2001. In December 2001, the trust sold the Red Sox to John W. Henry and his group of investors, New England Sports Ventures (later known as Fenway Sports Group), with the sale becoming official in February 2002.

| Preceded by Jean Yawkey (with Haywood Sullivan) | Owner of the Boston Red Sox; February 26, 1992 – December 20, 2001 (with Haywood Sullivan, February 26, 1992 – November 23, 1993) | Succeeded by John W. Henry (via Fenway Sports Group) |
