= Larry Lucchino =

American lawyer and baseball executive (1945–2024)

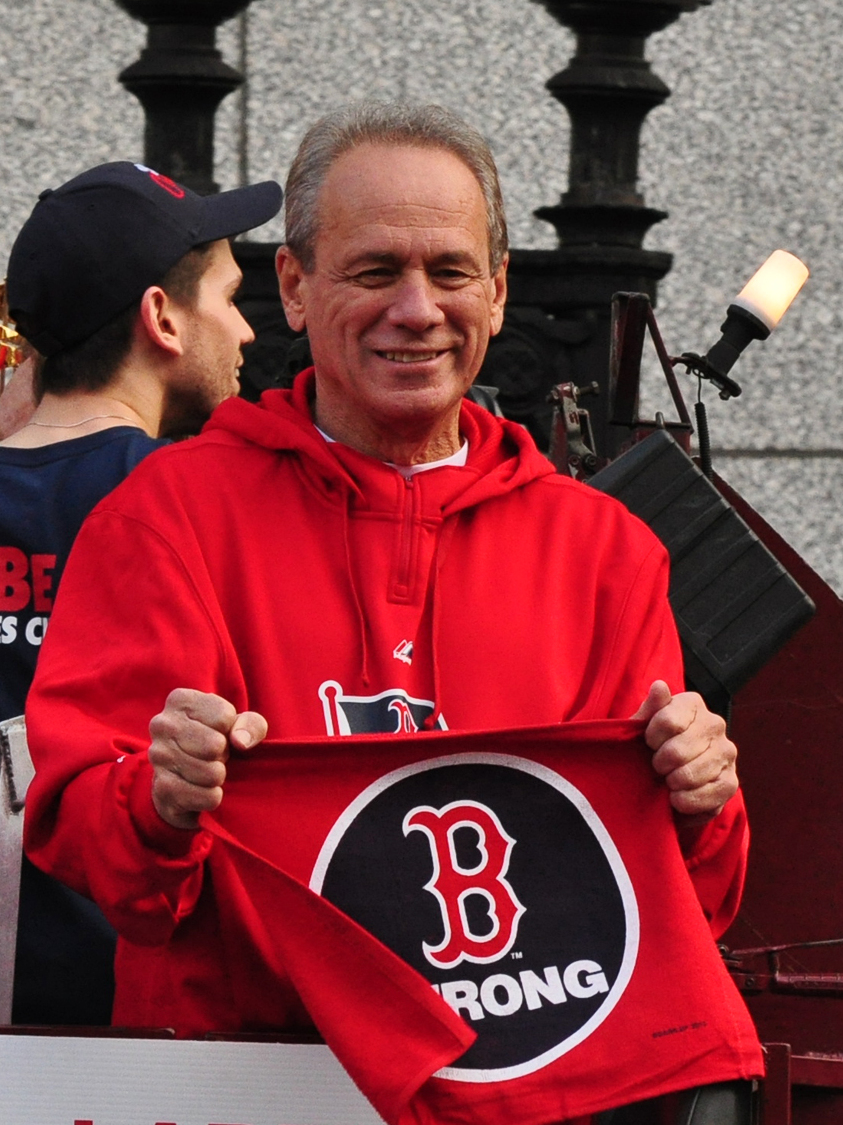
- Lucchino in 2013
- Born: Lawrence Lucchino; September 6, 1945; Pittsburgh, Pennsylvania, U.S.
- Died: April 2, 2024 (aged 78); Brookline, Massachusetts, U.S.
- Education: Princeton University (BA); Yale University (JD)
- Occupations: Lawyer and MLB executive
- Known for: President of the Baltimore Orioles (1988–1993); President/CEO of the San Diego Padres (1995–2001); President/CEO of the Boston Red Sox (2002–2015)
- Awards: 4× World Series champion (as executive) 1983, 2004, 2007, 2013; Super Bowl champion (as executive) (XVII); Boston Red Sox Hall of Fame (2016); San Diego Padres Hall of Fame (2022)

Lawrence Lucchino (September 6, 1945 – April 2, 2024) was an American lawyer and Major League Baseball executive. He served as president of the Baltimore Orioles, president and chief executive officer (CEO) of the San Diego Padres, and president and CEO of the Boston Red Sox. He was also chairman of the Worcester Red Sox, the Triple-A affiliate of the Boston Red Sox; chairman of The Jimmy Fund, the philanthropic arm of the Dana–Farber Cancer Institute; and president and CEO emeritus of Fenway Sports Group, the parent company of the Boston Red Sox and Liverpool F.C. Lucchino played college basketball for the Princeton Tigers.

== Early life and education ==
Lawrence Lucchino was born on September 6, 1945, in Pittsburgh. He graduated from Taylor Allderdice High School, and attended Princeton University, where he played college basketball. He was a member of the Princeton Tigers men's basketball team for the 1964–65, 1965–66, and 1966–67 seasons. The 1964–65 Tigers, captained by Bill Bradley, advanced to the Final Four of the 1965 NCAA University Division basketball tournament.

Lucchino graduated from Princeton in 1967. He earned a Juris Doctor from Yale Law School, where he was a classmate of Hillary Clinton.

== Career ==
After law school, Lucchino practiced law with the Washington, D. C., law firm of Williams & Connolly. The founder, famed litigator Edward Bennett Williams, had ownership interest in both the Washington Redskins and the Baltimore Orioles. Lucchino's law practice at Williams & Connolly included a substantial amount of work for those two sports teams. Through that work, Lucchino served on the Redskins' board of directors from 1979 to 1985.

Lucchino became president of the Baltimore Orioles, serving from 1988 to 1993, and president and CEO of the San Diego Padres, serving from 1995 to 2001. Lucchino subsequently joined the Boston Red Sox as president and CEO when John W. Henry purchased the team in December 2001. Lucchino was known for having initiated the trend of building baseball-only facilities with an old-fashioned charm and smaller seating capacities. Under his watch, both the Orioles and Padres built new stadiums, pioneering Oriole Park at Camden Yards and Petco Park, respectively.

He helped build Padres teams that made the playoffs in 1996 and 1998. They advanced to the 1998 World Series, which was instrumental in winning a city-wide vote in November 1998 to authorize the construction of Petco Park. Lucchino was named to the Padres Hall of Fame in 2022.

=== Boston Red Sox (2002–2021) ===
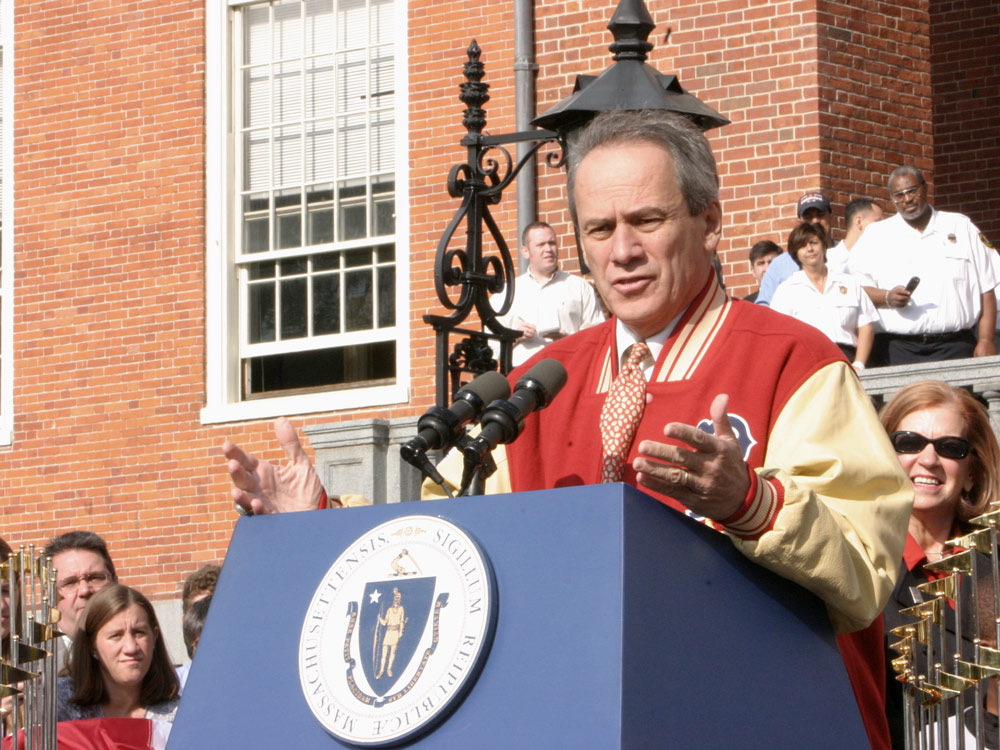
Lucchino celebrating the Red Sox's 2007 World Series victory at an event at the Massachusetts State House

Lucchino brought future general manager Theo Epstein with him to the Red Sox from the Orioles and the Padres, having also encouraged Epstein to attend law school while he was working at the Padres.

Following the 2002 season, Pedro Martinez called Lucchino asking him to sign David Ortiz, who had been released by the Twins. Lucchino "always enjoyed a strong connection with Big Papi throughout his entire career". Lucchino hired Janet Marie Smith to initiate a nearly $300 million renovation project of Fenway Park over the next ten years, including the Green Monster seats.

Lucchino is credited with coining the term "Evil Empire" for the New York Yankees.

On August 1, 2015, the Red Sox announced that Lucchino was stepping down after the 2015 season. He retired on October 5, 2015, and became president/CEO emeritus of Fenway Sports Group. Lucchino continued as chairman and co-owner of the Pawtucket, Rhode Island–based Pawtucket Red Sox. He was a key figure in the relocation of the franchise to Worcester, Massachusetts, becoming the Worcester Red Sox for the 2021 minor league season. Lucchino served as that team's first chairman.

== Personal life ==
Lucchino previously served on the board of directors for Special Olympics. He was a commencement speaker at several colleges in the New England area, including Boston University (2008), New England School of Law (2008), Bryant University (2009), Anna Maria College (2010), and Assumption University (2022). He was awarded several honorary degrees, including from Assumption University, Boston University, Suffolk University, and Palomar College.

On October 20, 2026, Assumption University established the Larry Lucchino Institute for the Study of Sports, following a multimillion-dollar investment from the Lucchino Family Foundation. The Institute, which is scheduled to begin programming in the fall of 2027, will use sports as a lens for the study of subjects including leadership, business, culture and civic life. The foundation was established to carry forward Lucchino's philanthropic legacy and supports initiatives in areas including healthcare, education, and community enrichment.

He was the only person known to have World Series rings (Orioles, 1983; Red Sox 2004, 2007, 2013 and 2018), a Super Bowl ring (Redskins, 1982) and a Final Four watch (Princeton, 1965). He was inducted into the Boston Red Sox Hall of Fame in 2016, and into the San Diego Padres Hall of Fame in 2022. He was also inducted into the Pennsylvania Sports Hall of Fame, the National Italian American Sports Hall of Fame, and the Taylor Allderdice High School Hall of Fame. He was named chairman of The Jimmy Fund in 2016.

Lucchino was a non-Hodgkin lymphoma survivor, undergoing radiation treatment in 1986 after his diagnosis in September 1985. In October 1999, he had surgery at Johns Hopkins Hospital to remove localized prostate cancer. In December 2019, he underwent surgery at Brigham and Women's Hospital in Boston to remove a cancerous blockage in the kidney area. In August 2023, the Dana-Farber Cancer Institute presented Lucchino with the Boston Red Sox Jimmy Fund Award for his help in raising $142 million over the years.

His marriage to Stacey Johnson ended in divorce.

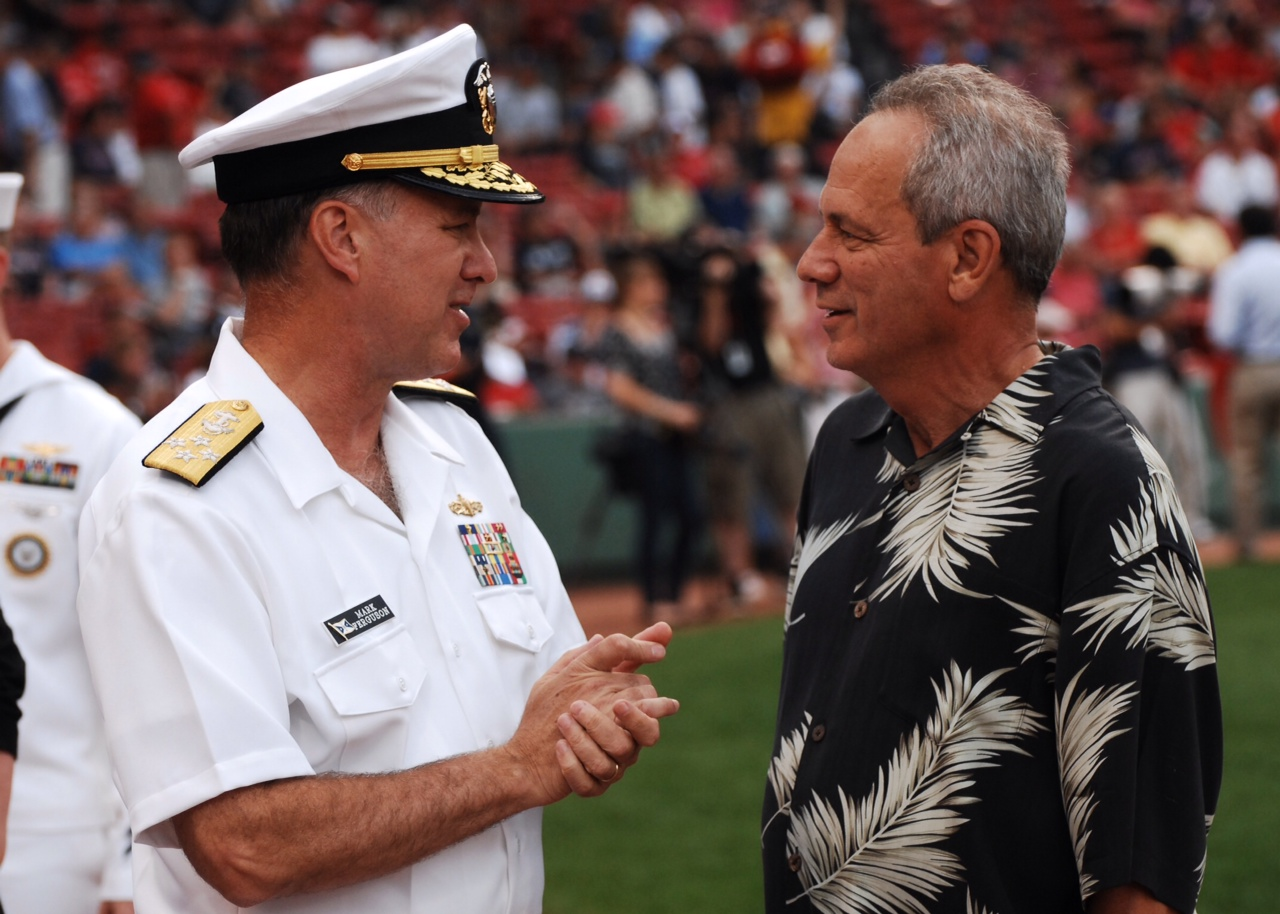
Lucchino, at right, with Vice Chief of Naval Operations Adm. Mark Ferguson in 2012

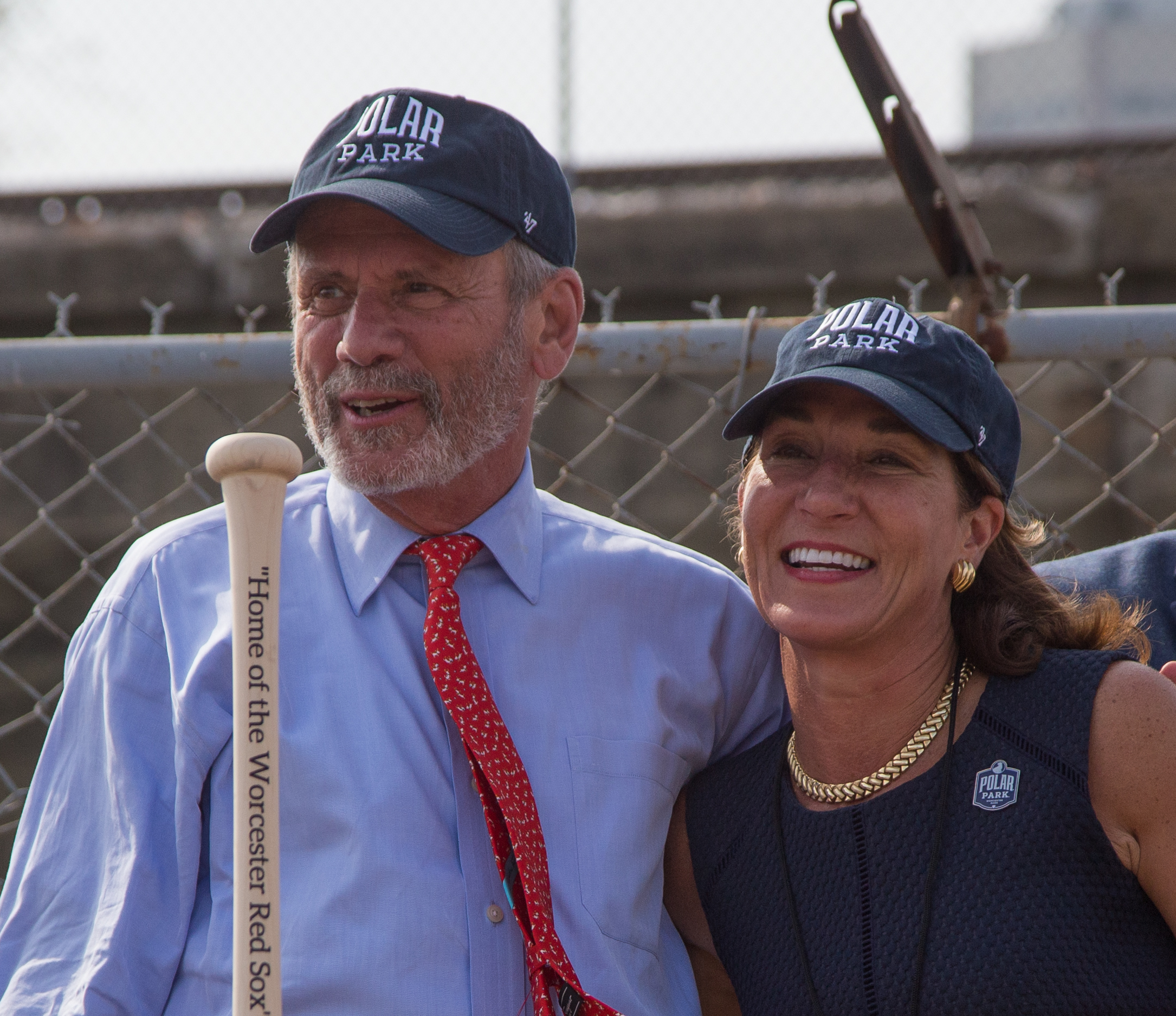
Lucchino with Massachusetts Lieutenant Governor Karyn Polito at the 2019 groundbreaking ceremony of the Polar Park minor league stadium in Worcester, Massachusetts

=== Death ===
On April 2, 2024, Lucchino died from heart failure at his home in Brookline, Massachusetts, at the age of 78. In August 2024, Red Sox principal owner John W. Henry commented:

Larry was the greatest baseball man I ever met. Usually when you call someone a baseball man, you are talking about his knowledge of the game on the field. In Larry’s case, baseball off the field was greater. He was unequivocally a Hall of Famer. The greatest baseball man.

Sporting positions
Preceded by John Harrington	Boston Red Sox President; 2002–2015	Succeeded by Sam Kennedy
