= Marc Sullivan =

American baseball player (born 1958)

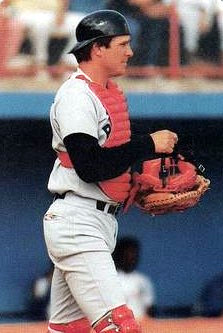
- Catcher
- Born: July 25, 1958 (age 68); Quincy, Massachusetts, U.S.
- Batted: Right Threw: Right

MLB debut
- October 1, 1982, for the Boston Red Sox

Last MLB appearance
- October 3, 1987, for the Boston Red Sox

MLB statistics
- Batting average: .186
- Home runs: 5
- Runs batted in: 28
- Stats at Baseball Reference

Teams
- Boston Red Sox (1982, 1984–1987)

Marc Cooper Sullivan (born July 25, 1958) is an American former professional baseball catcher who played for five Major League Baseball (MLB) seasons with the Boston Red Sox.

== Career ==
Sullivan was born in Quincy, Massachusetts. He is the son of former Red Sox player and general manager Haywood Sullivan. He played college baseball for the University of Florida. In 1977, he played collegiate summer baseball with the Orleans Cardinals of the Cape Cod Baseball League, and returned to the league in 1978 to play for the Chatham A's. Sullivan was selected by his father for the Red Sox in the second round of the 1979 MLB draft.

Sullivan was known as a defensive specialist and he managed a lifetime major league batting average of just .186 with a .236 on-base average and a slugging percentage of .258 in 360 at bats. He was traded to the Houston Astros in 1987 but never appeared in a game for their major league club.

== See also ==
- Florida Gators
- List of Florida Gators baseball players
- List of second-generation Major League Baseball players
