= Jersey Street (Boston) =

Street in Boston, Massachusetts

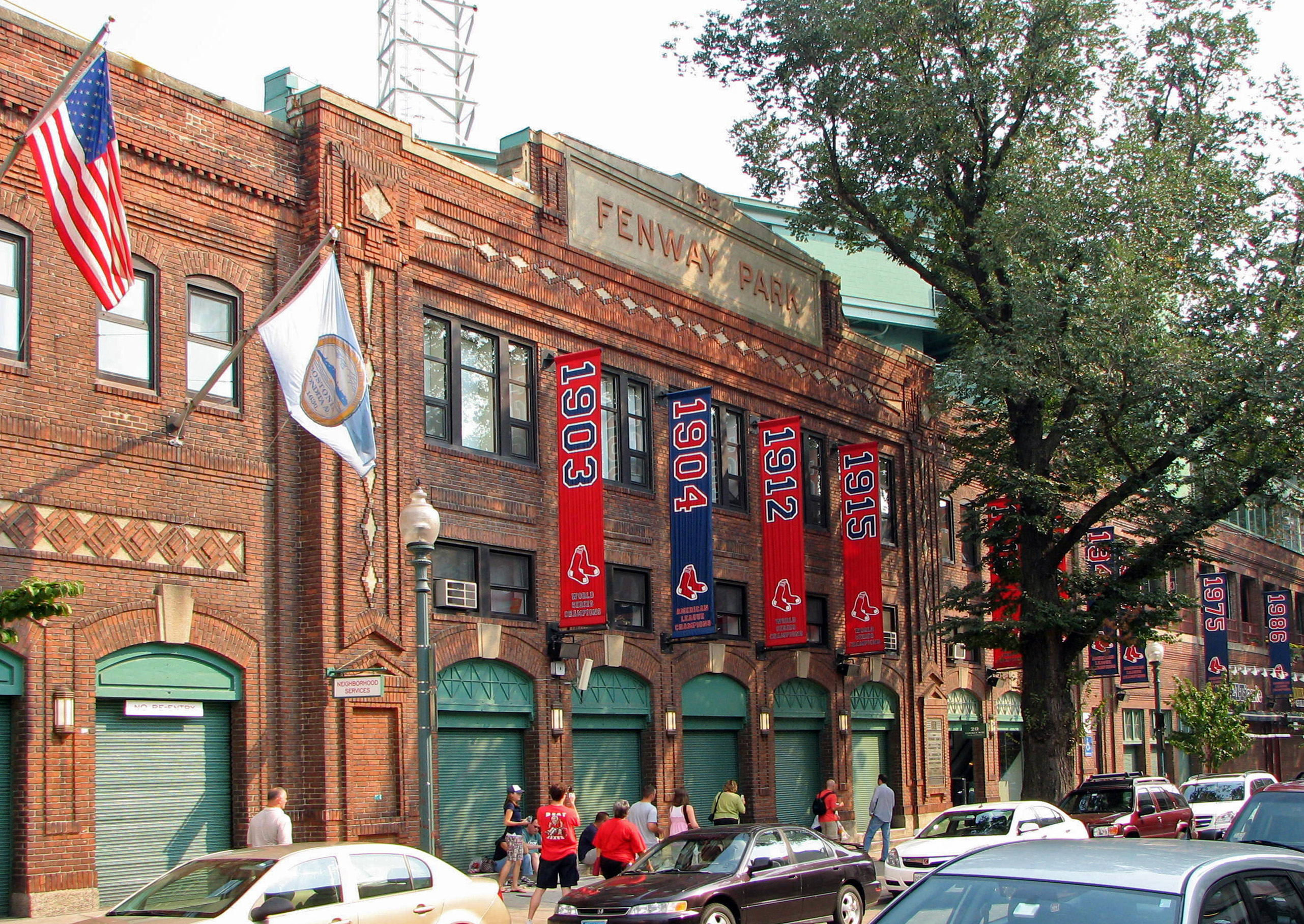
- The main entrance to Fenway Park is located on Jersey Street.
- Interactive map of Jersey Street
- Location: Boston
- South end: Park Drive
- North end: Brookline Avenue

Jersey Street is a street in the Fenway–Kenmore neighborhood of Boston, Massachusetts, part of a scheme of alphabetical street names in Back Bay. It lies parallel to Ipswich Street and Kilmarnock Street, and runs from Brookline Avenue to Park Drive. Named in the late 1850s, the street's name is a reference to the sixth Earl of Jersey, George Augustus Frederick Child Villiers.

Jersey Street is the address of Fenway Park, and a two-block section of Jersey Street where the ballpark is located was named Yawkey Way from 1977 until 2018.

== Yawkey Way ==
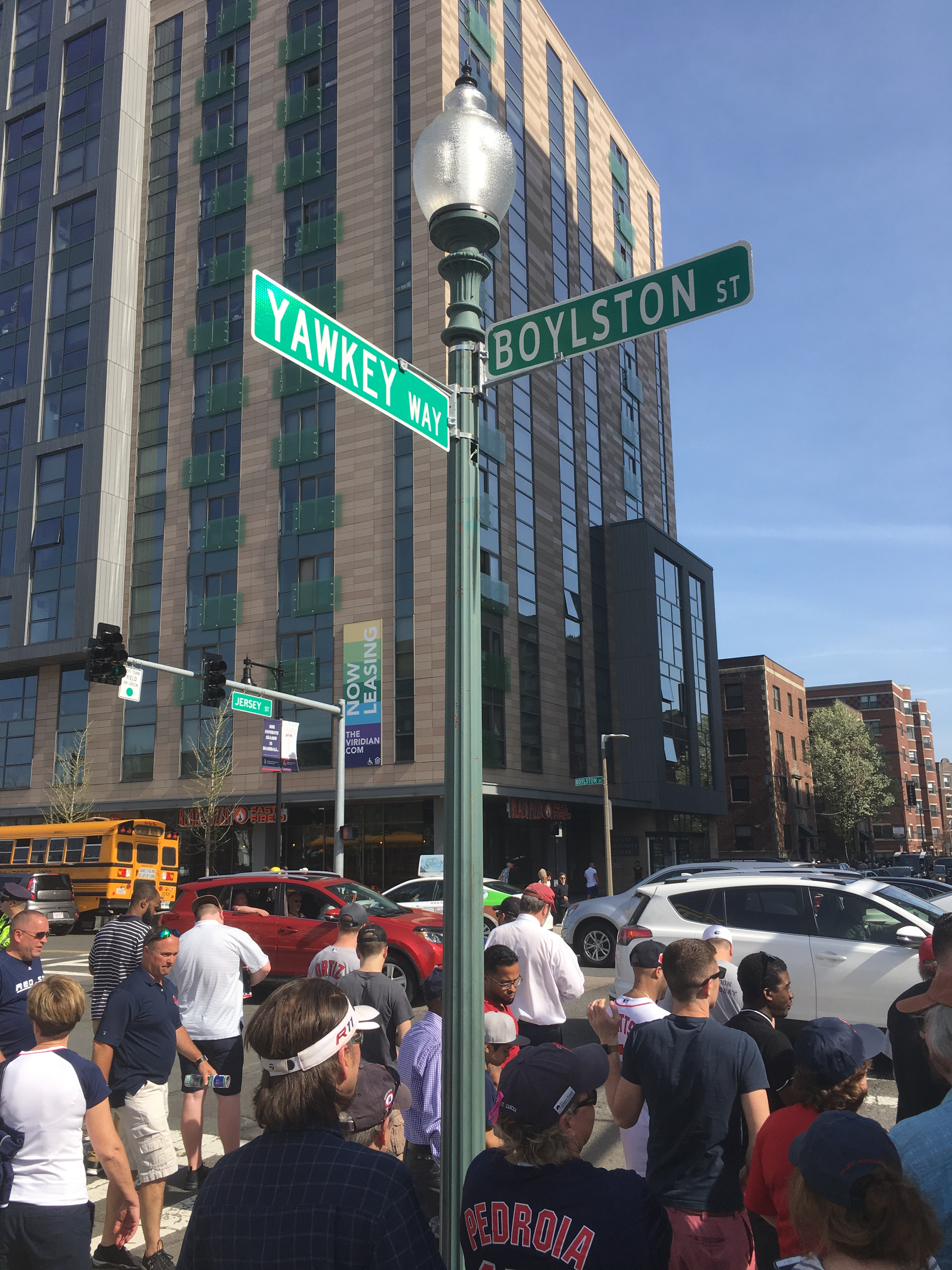
Yawkey Way intersection with Boylston Street in 2018

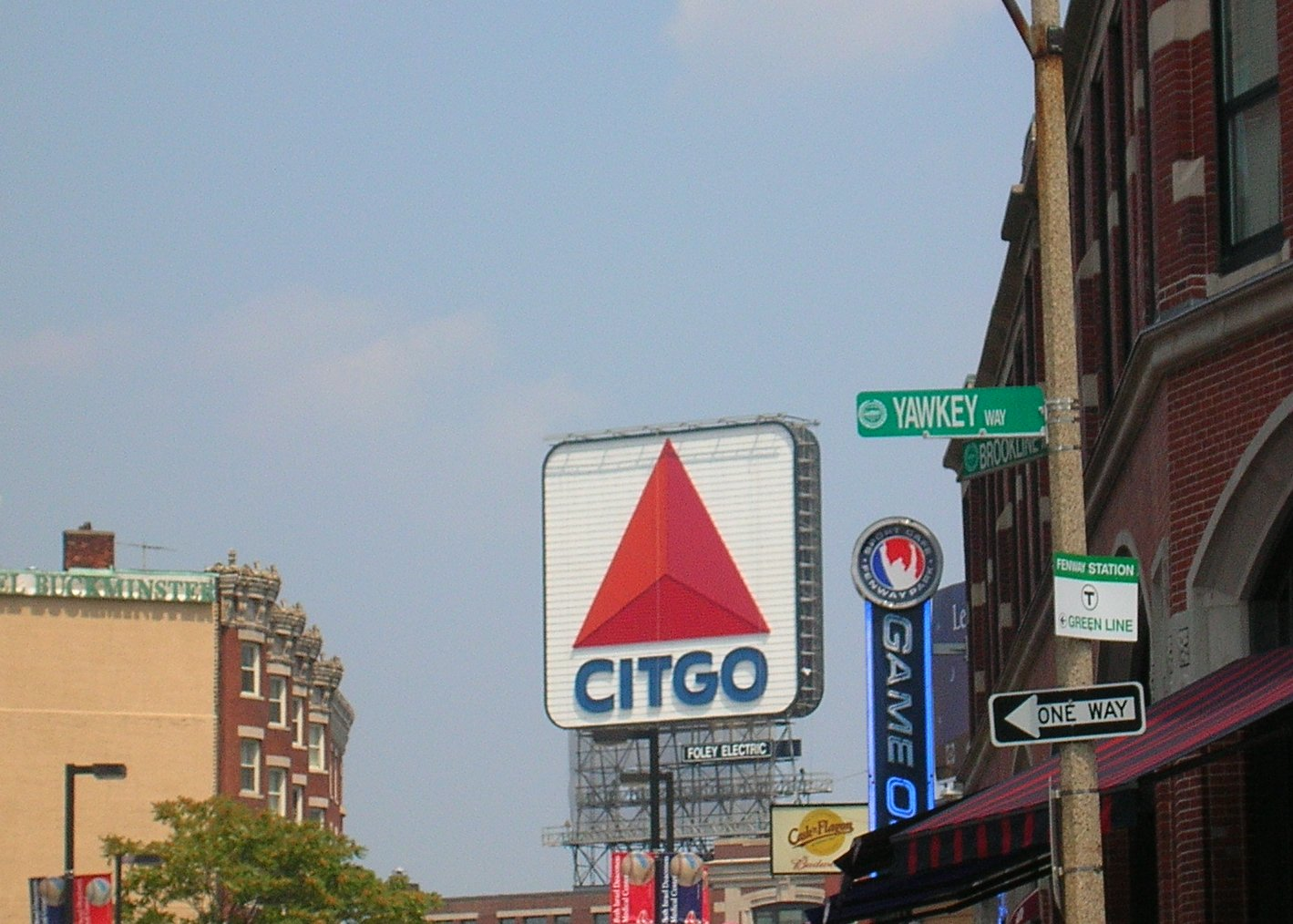
Yawkey Way sign and the Boston Citgo sign in 2006

In 1977, the two blocks of Jersey Street immediately adjacent to Fenway Park were renamed for Tom Yawkey, owner of the Boston Red Sox from 1933 to 1976.

In December 2015, The Boston Globe columnist Adrian Walker proposed renaming Yawkey Way and Yawkey station, citing Tom Yawkey's prolonged resistance to racial integration.

On August 17, 2017, amid heightened media coverage of the removal of Confederate monuments and memorials in the United States, Red Sox owner John W. Henry said the team would lead a campaign to change the street name because the team was the last in Major League Baseball to integrate. Henry said, "I am still haunted by what went on here a long time before we arrived."

In February 2018, it was announced that the Red Sox filed a petition with the city of Boston to restore Yawkey Way to its original name, Jersey Street. The change was opposed by the Yawkey Foundation, a charitable group funded by Yawkey's estate.

The Boston Public Improvement Commission heard public input on the proposal at its meeting on March 15, from supporters and opponents. The Commission could have voted on the change on March 29; however, after hearing additional input that day, the vote was delayed until April 12. On April 12, a decision was further postponed until April 26. On April 26, the Boston Public Improvement Commission unanimously approved the name change back to Jersey Street. The change from Yawkey Way to Jersey Street was made official on May 3, 2018.

The ballpark's original address was 24 Jersey Street. With the 1977 name change, it became 4 Yawkey Way. Since the restoration of the Jersey Street name in 2018, its address is 4 Jersey Street.

When reverting the Yawkey Way name to Jersey Street was approved, the Massachusetts Bay Transportation Authority (MBTA) stated that it would also rename nearby Yawkey station. On March 28, 2019, the MBTA announced that the station would be renamed Lansdowne station (after nearby Lansdowne Street, which runs along the back of the Green Monster) effective April 8, 2019.

== David Ortiz Drive ==
On June 22, 2017, the neighboring Yawkey Way Extension (beyond the end of Jersey Street at Brookline Avenue) was renamed David Ortiz Drive in honor of recently retired Red Sox all-star David Ortiz. The honor came a day before Ortiz's number was retired by the team.
