= Bing Devine =

American sports executive (1916–2007)

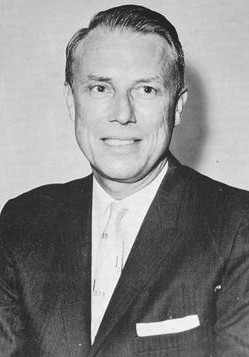
- Devine in 1962
- Born: March 1, 1916; St. Louis, Missouri, U.S.
- Died: January 27, 2007 (aged 90); St. Louis, Missouri, U.S.
- Occupation: Baseball executive

Vaughan Pallmore "Bing" Devine (March 1, 1916 – January 27, 2007) was an American front office executive in Major League Baseball and a major architect of four National League champions and three World Series champions in the six years from 1964 through 1969. He was selected The Sporting News MLB Executive of the Year in back-to-back seasons: 1963 and 1964.

Serving as general manager of the St. Louis Cardinals from November 12, 1957, through August 17, 1964, Devine was directly responsible for putting the 1964 world champion Cardinals on the field — even though he had been fired with seven weeks remaining in the season, one of the most bizarre events in baseball annals. Many of the players Devine acquired led the Cardinals to the 1967 world title and the 1968 NL championship, the latter occurring during Devine's second tour (from December 6, 1967, through October 18, 1978) as the Redbirds' general manager.

In between those terms, from 1965 to 1967, Devine was assistant to the president and then, after November 14, 1966, president (and de facto general manager) of the New York Mets, where he helped put together the organization that turned the franchise from baseball's laughingstocks into 1969's world champions as the "Miracle Mets." During the 1980s, he also served as president of the St. Louis football Cardinals of the National Football League before resuming his baseball career as a scout and senior advisor.

== Early baseball career ==
Devine was born in St. Louis, where he attended University City High School and Washington University in St. Louis. He played college basketball and semiprofessional baseball, then joined the Cardinals in 1939 as an office boy and batting practice pitcher. In 1941, he became business manager of the Class D level Johnson City Cardinals. During a roster shortage, Devine activated himself as a second baseman for 27 games and 93 at bats, but he garnered only 11 hits for a .118 batting average. Thereafter he hung up his uniform and concentrated on his work in the front office.

As pioneers of the farm system concept, the Cardinals had as many as 40 affiliated or owned teams in their minor league system before World War II. With time out for U.S. Navy service during the war, Devine rose rapidly through the ranks as a business manager of Cardinal farm teams, finally becoming the general manager of the Rochester Red Wings of the Triple-A International League in 1949. After six seasons at the helm of the Redbirds' top farm team, he joined the St. Louis front office in the autumn of 1954. The Cardinals, recently purchased by brewery magnate August A. Busch Jr., entered a rebuilding mode under trade-happy general manager "Frantic" Frank Lane after the 1955 season. The team finished second in the NL in 1957, but Lane had worn out his welcome; he moved on to run the Cleveland Indians and was replaced in St. Louis by the steadier hand of Devine.

== First term as Cardinals' general manager ==
Devine began to add talent and depth to the St. Louis roster, including African American and Latin American players. He was seen as being very progressive when it came to signing or trading for black and Latin ballplayers, whereas other teams (most notably the New York Yankees) showed a great deal of reluctance in this area. In the first five years of his reign, he promoted or traded for players such as Bob Gibson, Bill White, Curt Flood and Julián Javier. But the Cardinals were mired in the middle of the pack of a very powerful National League.

In 1963—a season also marked by the final campaign of the Cardinals' longtime superstar, Stan Musial—the Redbirds surged into contention, sparked by the acquisition of shortstop Dick Groat from the Pittsburgh Pirates, 18-win seasons from pitchers Gibson and Ernie Broglio, the comeback of left-handed starter Curt Simmons (who had been signed off the scrap heap by Devine), and the strong campaign of young catcher Tim McCarver. The Cardinals challenged the eventual world champion Los Angeles Dodgers into mid-September before finishing second, the club's highest showing since 1957. Devine was chosen as Major League Executive of the Year by The Sporting News for his efforts in returning the Cards to contending status.

== 1964: Premature firing and a world championship ==
However, when the 1964 season began, the Philadelphia Phillies took a stranglehold on first place. The Cardinals were trying a variety of young players in Musial's old left-field position, and none were taking hold. At the June 15 trading deadline, Devine sprang. Lou Brock, a 25-year-old outfielder with great speed (and deceptive power as a hitter) in his third year with the second-division Chicago Cubs, was not living up to his projected potential. Devine offered the Cubs Broglio, his 18-game winner from the previous year, plus outfielder Doug Clemens and pitcher Bobby Shantz, for Brock and two marginal pitchers. The Cubs agreed, and one of the most significant (and one-sided) trades in baseball history was made. Brock hit .348 for the remainder of the season, and led the Cardinals to their three pennants and two world titles over the next five years. He played the rest of his career with St. Louis (retiring in 1979), and would steal 938 bases (breaking Ty Cobb's record, and currently second all-time to Rickey Henderson), exceed the 3,000 hit mark (with 3,023), bat .424 with 34 hits and 14 stolen bases in 21 World Series games, and become a member of the Baseball Hall of Fame.

Ironically, Brock's impact on the Cardinals' won-lost mark or position in the standings was not felt immediately. The team continued to trail the Phillies by a large margin and it looked to all as though the club's pennant drought would extend to 18 years; by August 17, the Redbirds were mired in fifth place, nine games behind the Phillies. Owner Busch was bitterly disappointed, and decided to clean out his front office. On the advice of his special assistant, legendary Branch Rickey, Busch fired Devine and business manager Art Routzong, and accepted the resignation of director of player personnel Eddie Stanky. Manager Johnny Keane was temporarily spared, but Leo Durocher, then the bench coach of the Dodgers, was secretly negotiating with Busch to take over for 1965. Meanwhile, Devine's old job went to Rickey protégé Bob Howsam.

As events unfolded, Busch had acted in haste. The Cardinals began to win, while the Phillies suffered an epic September collapse, losing a 6 1/2-game lead with a dozen games to play, sparking a wild, four-team, 11th hour scramble for the pennant. On the final day of the season, after sweeping the Phillies to take first place, the Cardinals prevailed, clinching the NL championship for the first time since 1946 by beating the lowly Mets after losing the first two games of the series. Led by Gibson, the undisputed ace of the staff since Broglio's trade, and McCarver, the Cardinals then defeated the New York Yankees in a seven-game World Series. Even though he had been on the sidelines since August 17, Devine again was cited as the top executive in baseball by The Sporting News. Meanwhile, Keane resigned after the World Series triumph (and became skipper of the Yankees). Instead of Durocher, Cardinal coach Red Schoendienst was named as manager for 1965.

== Building the Miracle Mets ==
Devine's departure was a cause-celebre in St. Louis, but the damage had been done. Although he landed on his feet as the successor to George Weiss, president of the Mets, Devine was forced to leave his hometown and the only team he had ever worked for at the pinnacle of his career. But, while Devine never moved his family to New York, he tackled his new job with gusto. On his watch, the Mets began to strengthen their farm system, signing and developing young pitching talent that formed the core of the 1969 world champions: Tom Seaver, Jerry Koosman, Nolan Ryan, Gary Gentry and Jim McAndrew. Meanwhile, Howsam left the Cardinals in January 1967 to become general manager of the Cincinnati Reds and Musial was named his successor.

In 1967, the Cardinals won 101 games and ran away with the National League race, winning the pennant by 10 1/2 games, then bested the Boston Red Sox in a seven-game World Series. The core of the team was Devine's, but Howsam had contributed significantly to the roster with his 1966 acquisitions of NL Most Valuable Player first baseman Orlando Cepeda and right fielder Roger Maris. At the other extreme, the Mets, with most of their young pitching talent still ripening in the minors, lost 101 games and finished dead last. Baseball people took note of Devine's accomplishments in New York, however, and when Musial, a world champion general manager in his maiden season, decided he did not want to continue in the role, Busch was able to secure Devine's release from the Mets, and brought him back to the Cardinals as executive vice president and general manager on December 2, 1967.

== Second term as Cardinals' general manager ==
In 1968, led by Gibson's all-time record 1.12 earned run average, the Cardinals repeated as NL champions and held a three games to one lead in the World Series against the Detroit Tigers, but lost the final three contests to be denied back-to-back world titles. Suddenly, Devine was faced with retooling an aging roster. Brock and Gibson remained Cardinal mainstays, but Devine traded Cepeda to the Atlanta Braves after the 1968 season, then dealt Flood and McCarver to Philadelphia following the 1969 campaign. In the Cepeda deal, Devine acquired Joe Torre, who won the 1971 NL batting average championship and the league's Most Valuable Player award. But the Cardinals suffered long-term damage when Busch ordered Devine to trade star left-handed pitcher Steve Carlton in 1972 after a salary dispute. Carlton, coming off his first 20-win season, was sent to the Phillies for pitcher Rick Wise, an uneven swap that helped to turn the last-place Phillies into contenders. Meanwhile, the Cardinals became NL East also-rans.

In mid-October 1978, Devine was again replaced as Cardinals' general manager (this time by John Claiborne) and again he departed the organization, working for the San Francisco Giants as assistant general manager, the Montreal Expos as a player development official, and the Phillies as a scout. From 1981 to 1986, he was club president of the St. Louis Cardinals of the NFL. But eventually he returned to the baseball Cardinals, where he served as a special scout and advisor to general manager Walt Jocketty.

Devine died in St. Louis at the age of 90.

| Preceded by Frank Lane | St. Louis Cardinals General Manager; 1957–1964 | Succeeded by Bob Howsam |
| Preceded by George Weiss | New York Mets General Manager; 1966–1967 | Succeeded by Johnny Murphy |
| Preceded by George Weiss | New York Mets President; 1966–1967 | Succeeded by Joan Payson |
| Preceded by Stan Musial | St. Louis Cardinals General Manager; 1967–1978 | Succeeded by John Claiborne |
