= Richard Warke =

Canadian billionaire businessman

- Occupation: Businessman
- Title: Chairman, Augusta Group of Companies

Richard William Warke is a billionaire businessman based in Vancouver, British Columbia. He is the chairman of the Augusta Group of Companies, including Titan Mining Corp, Highlander Silver Corp and Solaris Resources Corp.

Warke also owns a variety of Professional Sports team interests, he is a partner in the PGA Tour, the Boston Celtics as well as a partner in Fenway Sports Group, who own the Boston Red Sox, Liverpool FC in addition to other sports related assets.

== Career ==
Warke began his career in the mining industry over thirty years ago. One of his first large mining deals was the sale of Ventana Gold Corp. in 2011 to Eike Batista for C$1.6 billion. Ventana Gold was a gold company focused on developing its La Bodega Project covering 880 hectares in the California-Vetas district of Colombia.

Three years after the sale of Ventana Gold, in 2014, Warke sold Augusta Resource Corp., an exploration company focused on the Rosemont Copper project in Pima County, Arizona. As the company’s Executive Chairman, Warke led Augusta Resource Corp. until it was sold in a friendly takeover to HudBay Minerals Inc. for C$666 million.

In 2016, Warke turned his attention to building NewCastle Gold, a company exploring at the Castle Mountain Gold Project, a past-producing heap-leach gold mine in San Bernardino County, California. Warke and his team at NewCastle Gold began aggressively drilling at Castle Mountain, with a successful three-way merger announced one year later, resulting in the creation of Equinox Gold now valued at $4 Billion.

In one of the largest mining deals of 2018, Warke sold Arizona Mining Inc., which he founded in 2006 and led as its Executive Chairman. Developing a zinc, lead and silver mine near the U.S. and Mexico border, Arizona Mining gained recognition for its discovery of the Taylor deposit, one of the world’s largest zinc deposits, which was discovered by Don Taylor. In 2018, Arizona Mining was bought out for C$2.1 billion by Australian miner, South32.
