= Edward F. Kenney Sr. =

American baseball executive

Edward Francis Kenney Sr. (February 11, 1921 – October 25, 2006) was an American professional baseball executive for the Boston Red Sox of Major League Baseball (MLB).

== Biography ==
A native of Massachusetts, Kenney was born in Medford and raised in Winchester. He later spent three years as the starting shortstop for the Boston College, where he graduated in 1943 and enlisted in the United States Army. At the conclusion of World War II, he was signed by Hugh Duffy, a Boston Red Sox scout and former manager, who converted him to a pitcher. Kenney joined the Boston organization as a prospect in 1946, but his pitching career was curtailed prematurely by arm problems.

In 1948, Kenney joined the Red Sox' minor-league department. One year later became assistant farm system director to Johnny Murphy and later to Neil Mahoney. That department was divided into two sections in 1968, and Kenney became director of minor league operations until 1978, when was promoted to vice president. From 1989 until his 1991 retirement, Kenney served as vice president of baseball development.

Kenney died on October 25, 2006, in Braintree, Massachusetts, due to complications related to diabetes. In 2008, Kenney was selected for induction into the Boston Red Sox Hall of Fame.
