= Haywood Sullivan =

American baseball player, manager, and executive (1930–2003)

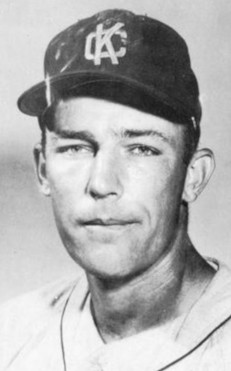
- Catcher
- Born: December 15, 1930; Donalsonville, Georgia, U.S.
- Died: February 12, 2003 (aged 72); Fort Myers, Florida, U.S.
- Batted: Right Threw: Right

MLB debut
- September 20, 1955, for the Boston Red Sox

Last MLB appearance
- June 30, 1963, for the Kansas City Athletics

MLB statistics
- Batting average: .226
- Home runs: 13
- Runs batted in: 87
- Managerial record: 54–82
- Winning %: .397
- Stats at Baseball Reference

Teams
- As player: Boston Red Sox (1955, 1957, 1959–1960); Kansas City Athletics (1961–1963); As manager: Kansas City Athletics (1965)

Career highlights and awards
- Boston Red Sox Hall of Fame

Haywood Cooper Sullivan (December 15, 1930 – February 12, 2003) was an American college and professional baseball player who was a catcher, manager, general manager and club owner in Major League Baseball. From May 23, 1978, through November 23, 1993, he was a general partner in the Boston Red Sox, where he parlayed a $200,000 investment into a cash out of at least $12 million. He was the father of Marc Sullivan.

== Early years ==
Sullivan was born in Donalsonville, Georgia, and raised in Dothan, Alabama. He graduated from Dothan High School on May 27, 1949. He received an athletic scholarship to attend the University of Florida in Gainesville, Florida, where he was the starting quarterback for coach Bob Woodruff's Florida Gators football team in 1950 and 1951, and a standout catcher for coach Dave Fuller's Gators baseball team in 1951 and 1952.

In his two seasons as the Gators' quarterback, Sullivan threw for 2,016 yards in an era when the emphasis was on a running offense.

As a Gators baseball player, he was named to the All-Southeastern Conference (SEC) team in 1952.

He threw and batted right-handed, stood 6 feet 4 inches (1.93 m) tall and weighed 215 pounds (98 kg).

Sullivan signed a guaranteed $45,000 bonus contract with the Red Sox in 1952, a contract which would not have been available a year later under pending baseball rules changes, and thereby ended his college football and baseball career after his junior year. He was later inducted into the University of Florida Athletic Hall of Fame as a "Gator Great."

== MLB catcher and manager ==
Sullivan's professional baseball playing career—derailed by military service, which caused him to miss the 1953 and 1954 seasons, and back surgery that cost him the entire 1958 campaign—was largely confined to the minor leagues for its first eight seasons.

After three short stays and only eight total games played for the Red Sox (in 1955, 1957 and 1959), Sullivan finally established himself in the big leagues in 1960 at age 29. He was the starting backstop for Boston's first three games, including the then-traditional "Presidential Opener" at Washington's Griffith Stadium. However, Sullivan injured his hand in the third game of the season and struggled offensively afterward, hitting only .135 through June 13 and 36 games played. That day, the Red Sox acquired catcher Russ Nixon from the Cleveland Indians, and from then through the end of the campaign, Sullivan played only sparingly. He ended the season as Boston's second-most-used catcher, behind Nixon, with 50 games and 342 1/3 innings caught. But he batted only .161 with four extra-base hits and was left exposed in the 1960 Major League Baseball expansion draft. The newly created edition of the Washington Senators franchise picked him up, then traded him to the Kansas City Athletics for pitcher Marty Kutyna on December 29, 1960.

Sullivan played for 2 1/2 seasons with the Athletics, and was the club's semi-regular catcher in 1961 and 1962, starting 78 and 80 games behind the plate. In a three-game span against his former team, the Red Sox, at Municipal Stadium from July 12–14, 1962, Sullivan had seven hits in 11 at bats, with two home runs, although Boston won all three games. For his MLB career, Sullivan batted .226 with 192 hits, 30 doubles and 13 home runs in 312 games over all or parts of seven seasons.

In 1964, Sullivan was named manager of the Athletics' Birmingham Barons farm club in the Double-A Southern League. His 1964 Barons—the first integrated team in Birmingham—missed the pennant by just one game, earning him a promotion to the Vancouver Mounties of the Triple-A Pacific Coast League in 1965. After only 25 games in Vancouver, Sullivan was called to Kansas City to manage the parent Athletics on May 16, 1965, succeeding Mel McGaha. At 34, Sullivan was the youngest manager in Major League Baseball that season. Kansas City had lost 21 of its first 26 games and was lodged in last place in the ten-team American League when McGaha was fired, and they remained in the cellar for the rest of the 1965 season, winning 54 and losing 82 (.397) with Sullivan at the reins.

=== Managerial record ===
Team	Year	Regular season					Postseason			
Team	Year	Games	Won	Lost	Win %	Finish	Won	Lost	Win %	Result
KCA	1965	136	54	82	.397	Tenth in AL	–	–	–	–
Total		136	54	82	.397		0	0	–	

== Front office and ownership career ==
=== Role with Bosox' 1967 pennant winners ===
On November 28, 1965, he was recruited by the Red Sox, who had reorganized their front office under new general manager Dick O'Connell. As vice president, player personnel, Sullivan was positioned as the top "baseball man" in the organization, and from 1965 to 1967 was instrumental in acquiring several players from the Athletics (among them John Wyatt, José Tartabull, Ken Harrelson and Bill Landis) who would help lead Boston to its surprise 1967 AL pennant. But O'Connell gradually assumed more power and took over most of Sullivan's responsibilities; Sullivan kept his title but in reality became the Red Sox' director of scouting after the 1973 death of Neil Mahoney.

Despite his decline in overall authority, Sullivan maintained very close personal ties with owner Tom Yawkey and his wife, Jean. In 1977, a year after Tom Yawkey died of leukemia, the Red Sox were put up for sale. Sullivan—reportedly borrowing $100,000 and using his home as collateral—joined an ownership group organized by former Red Sox athletic trainer Edward "Buddy" LeRoux. Because of Sullivan's close friendship with Jean Yawkey, the LeRoux offer was accepted, even though it was not the highest bid and the group did not have the financial resources of some of its rivals. The American League initially rejected the deal, but reconsidered when Mrs. Yawkey joined the group in May 1978, becoming principal owner, general partner and team president.

=== Co-owner and general manager ===
Before the sale was consummated, in October 1977, Mrs. Yawkey fired O'Connell and promoted Sullivan to general manager. Overall, his first off-season as GM of the Red Sox was highly successful. Still using the resources of the Yawkey fortune, and benefitting from the depth of the Red Sox farm system that he helped to build, Sullivan acquired players Mike Torrez, Jerry Remy, Dick Drago, Tom Burgmeier and Dennis Eckersley. Buoyed by the new additions to an already strong team, the Red Sox charged into first place in the 1978 AL East race, but they would squander a 14 1/2 game lead over the New York Yankees and then lose a one-game playoff for the division title to miss the postseason completely.

Although manager Don Zimmer is usually cast as the chief culprit for the collapse, in the six months between December 14, 1977, and June 15, 1978, Sullivan contributed to the debacle by dealing away useful players such as Ferguson Jenkins, Reggie Cleveland, Jim Willoughby and Bernie Carbo. Sullivan and Zimmer considered them to be "clubhouse lawyers"—malcontents—but in return for them, the Red Sox received only one ballplayer, journeyman left-hander John Poloni, acquired for Jenkins, and four cash payments. Poloni never appeared in a Boston uniform, while, in 1978, Jenkins went 18–8 (3.04) for the Texas Rangers. Overall, the loss of pitching depth and bench strength was a critical factor in the 1978 Red Sox' ultimate failure.

=== Post-1978 decline and the "Coup LeRoux" ===
After the 1978 season, Sullivan allowed legendary pitcher Luis Tiant to leave for the Yankees as a free agent and, as he had done with Jenkins, Carbo and the others, dumped a clubhouse dissident, lefty pitcher Bill Lee, in a giveaway trade—in this case, to the Montreal Expos for utility infielder Stan Papi. In 1979, Sullivan raised eyebrows when he selected his son Marc, who was not considered to have early-round talent, in the second round of baseball's amateur draft; the younger Sullivan would bat a paltry .186 in parts of five major league seasons.

In December 1980, Sullivan faced the imminent free agency of Rick Burleson, Carlton Fisk and Fred Lynn—Boston's starting shortstop, catcher and center fielder, and the "up the middle" core of the ball club. The three players, represented by agent Jeremy Kapstein, had been embroiled in a contract dispute with the team in 1976, the first year of free agency, and hard feelings still lingered between them and owners Sullivan and Mrs. Yawkey. On December 10, Sullivan was able to trade Burleson for value (young third baseman Carney Lansford and relief pitcher Mark Clear). But he then failed to mail contract offers to Lynn and Fisk by MLB's mandated deadline of December 20, unintentionally triggering a binding arbitration hearing in January 1981 that speeded their free agency. On January 23, Sullivan was forced to accept fifty cents on the dollar for Lynn in a trade to the California Angels, who signed him immediately to a multi-year contract. Then, on February 12, he lost Fisk outright when the arbitrator declared the catcher a free agent. Fisk played the rest of his Baseball Hall of Fame career as a member of the Chicago White Sox, retiring in 1993.

From then on, Sullivan's reputation in Boston was tarnished. Harrelson, the former outfielder acquired by the Red Sox in August 1967 with Sullivan's help and now a popular analyst on the team's TV broadcasts, called him "the laughing-stock of the American League." (Like Fisk, Harrelson would soon depart for the White Sox.) Vendors outside Fenway Park sold tee-shirts emblazoned with "Haywood and Buddy [LeRoux] are Killing the Sox." Marvin Miller, head of the MLBPA, described the Red Sox' Lynn/Fisk contract snafu as "stupidity of the highest order."

After signing veteran Tony Pérez in 1980, Sullivan refused to enter the market for free agents, preferring to rely exclusively on player development. But the Boston farm system hit a dry spell resulting from poor drafts during Sullivan's tenure as GM; the only starting player drafted and signed by the Red Sox between 1977 and 1979 was Marty Barrett. The formerly high-paying Red Sox gained a new reputation for stinginess: by 1983, the team ranked 16th among the 26 MLB teams in average salary. The decline showed on the field: only in the strike-mangled season of 1981 did the Red Sox finish within five games of first place in the AL East between 1979 and 1985. At the turnstiles, a team that had drawn 2.4 million home fans in 1979 saw its attendance drop by 29 percent to 1.7 million by 1984.

Sullivan's legacy received another battering in 1983 when a long-simmering estrangement from LeRoux became embarrassingly public. On June 6, just prior to a ceremony celebrating the Red Sox' 1967 AL championship, and raising money to care for stricken former outfielder Tony Conigliaro, LeRoux called a press conference to reveal that he and his limited partners had exercised a clause in their ownership agreement and taken control of the Red Sox. He fired Sullivan on the spot, and restored O'Connell—who hadn't set foot in Fenway Park since his dismissal in 1977—to the GM post. Boston sportswriters called the gambit "the Coup LeRoux." Sullivan and Mrs. Yawkey then immediately called their own press conference to announce they had filed suit to prevent the takeover. A court granted them an injunction, and in a public 1984 trial that aired dirty laundry on both sides, Sullivan and Yawkey won the day again.

=== From GM to CEO/COO ===
But the damage had been done. Sullivan voluntarily gave up his general manager duties to Lou Gorman in June 1984, immediately after the court victory over LeRoux, and became the team's chief executive and chief operating officer. Gorman received credit for trades that helped the 1986 Red Sox win the AL championship, although Sullivan's determination to build from within helped to furnish the club with many of its key players.

During Sullivan's tenure as general manager and chief executive, the Red Sox, with their history as the last pre-expansion MLB team to break the color line, were again criticized for anti-Black bigotry. In a 1985 public reckoning, the team was sued by former outfielder and coach Tommy Harper for retaliation after the Red Sox fired Harper as a minor league base-running instructor when he shared with the media the club's practice of allowing the all-white Elks Club of Winter Haven, Florida (where the team held spring training) into the Red Sox' Chain of Lakes Park clubhouse to invite white players and white front-office personnel to the Elks' segregated facilities. Harper's complaint about the Red Sox' illegal actions was upheld by the Equal Employment Opportunity Commission on July 1, 1986.

When the Red Sox re-entered the free agent market late in the 1980s, they were able to sign All-Star catcher Tony Peña, but many nonwhite players ignored the Red Sox in free agency, or included them on their "no trade" lists. This trend only began to change when the Red Sox bid aggressively (but unsuccessfully) for Kirby Puckett after the 1992 season.

In late March 1987, Jean Yawkey bought out LeRoux and, with two general partnership shares, she became the Red Sox' managing partner. Sullivan and Mrs. Yawkey grew distant, and, although he still held a general partnership in the team, by the late 1980s Sullivan was consistently outvoted 2–1 by Mrs. Yawkey's two shares. (Sullivan's title of CEO/COO, meanwhile, quietly was removed from the team's masthead.) When Mrs. Yawkey died in 1992, Sullivan and her representative, John Harrington, who headed the JRY Trust, each vowed to buy the other out. On November 23, 1993, Harrington made good his word, acquiring Sullivan's share in the team on behalf of the trust; while initially reported as $12 million, later estimates placed the buyout at $30 million or more.

== Life after baseball ==
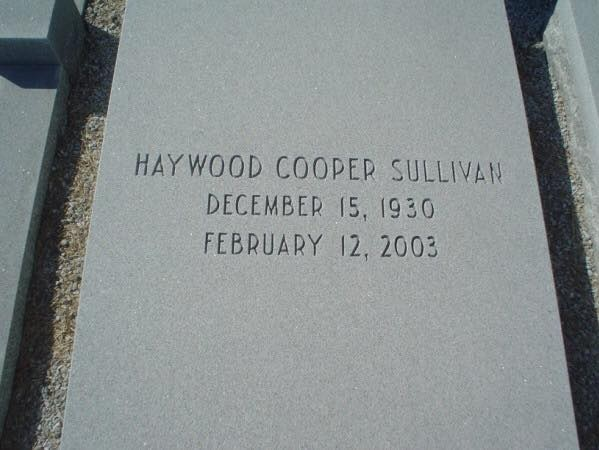
Sullivan's tomb

Sullivan then retired to the Gulf Coast of Florida, where he operated a marina and invested successfully in real estate, his name occasionally popping up (usually linked with former Commissioner of Baseball Fay Vincent) as a potential part-owner of another Major League club. Upon Sullivan's death at age 72 in Fort Myers, Florida, after suffering a stroke, Boston baseball observers such as Peter Gammons took a fresh view of Sullivan's impact on the Red Sox and gave him renewed credit for building the team into contenders, and keeping them there, from 1966 forward. Sullivan is interred at the Dothan City Cemetery. He was named to the Boston Red Sox Hall of Fame in 2004.

== See also ==
- Boston Red Sox all-time roster
- Florida Gators
- Florida Gators football, 1950–59
- List of Florida Gators baseball players
- List of University of Florida Athletic Hall of Fame members

== Bibliography ==
- Bryant, Howard, Shut Out: A Story of Race and Baseball in Boston. Boston: The Beacon Press, 2002.
- Gammons, Peter, Beyond the Sixth Game. Boston: Houghton-Mifflin Co., 1985.
- Spink, C.C. Johnson, editor, The 1965 Baseball Guide. St. Louis: The Sporting News, 1966.
- Stout, Glenn and Johnson, Richard A., Red Sox Century. Boston and New York: Houghton-Mifflin Co., 2000.
- Obituary, The Boston Globe, February 13, 2003.

Sporting positions
Preceded by Jean Yawkey	Owner of the Boston Red Sox; September 30, 1977 – November 23, 1993 (with Buddy LeRoux, September 30, 1977 – March 31, 1987) (with Jean Yawkey, September 30, 1977 – February 26, 1992) (with JRY Trust, February 26, 1992 – November 23, 1993)	Succeeded by JRY Trust
Preceded by Franchise re-established	Birmingham Barons manager 1964	Succeeded by John McNamara
Preceded by Franchise re-established	Vancouver Mounties manager 1965	Succeeded by Bobby Hofman
