= Dick O'Connell =

American baseball executive

- Born: September 19, 1914; Winthrop, Massachusetts, U.S.
- Died: August 18, 2002 (aged 87); Lexington, Massachusetts, U.S.
- Occupation: Baseball executive
- Years active: 1947–1977

Richard Henry O'Connell (September 19, 1914 – August 18, 2002) was an American front office executive in Major League Baseball. He was executive vice president of the Boston Red Sox from 1961 through 1977 and served as general manager of the team from September 16, 1965, through October 24, 1977, a period during which he played a pivotal role in restoring the Red Sox to contending status, won two American League pennants, and helped make the team a flagship MLB franchise.

== Early life ==
A native of Winthrop, Massachusetts, O'Connell attended Boston College, earning a bachelor's degree in 1937 and a master's degree the following year. He worked in private business and taught and coached athletics at Sanborn Academy, Kingston, New Hampshire, until the outbreak of World War II. While serving in the U.S. Navy, he befriended a fellow officer, Jim Britt, the radio play-by-play announcer for the Red Sox and Boston's National League team, the Braves. After the war, Britt put O'Connell in touch with the Red Sox front office, and he entered baseball in 1947 as business manager of the Lynn Red Sox, the Bosox' Class B New England League farm club.

== Rising through the Red Sox' ranks ==
Two years later, O'Connell joined Boston's front office in an administrative capacity. He rose through the ranks, serving as "home secretary" and director of stadium operations, then became the Red Sox' business manager during the late 1950s. It appeared that he would rise no further. Tom Yawkey, the Red Sox' owner and club president since 1933, had historically hired famous former players to serve as his general manager, and through 1960 his three GMs—Eddie Collins, Joe Cronin and Bucky Harris—were all current or future members of the Baseball Hall of Fame; Collins and Cronin were standout players, while Harris had won three American League pennants and two World Series as a field manager. With the Red Sox' great left fielder, Ted Williams, about to retire, and with the team's fortunes at a low ebb, Yawkey fired Harris in September 1960 and informally offered the GM post to Williams. But the future Hall-of-Fame hitter was not interested in an office job; he preferred to fish and teach hitting in spring training.

As the GM seat lay vacant—but perhaps being kept warm for Williams, who was named an "executive assistant" to Yawkey—O'Connell was promoted to executive vice president; meanwhile, field manager Pinky Higgins, who had become a friend of Yawkey's, staked out a position as the top "baseball man" in the Red Sox organization. The New York Times reported on October 1, 1960, that Higgins would assume responsibility for all player personnel decisions, Major and minor league, in the Boston organization, a role typically performed by a general manager. With this restructuring, the club spent the 1961 and 1962 seasons without a full-time GM. Although O'Connell is listed by the Red Sox media guide as de facto general manager, he retained the title of business manager and likely focused only on the administrative aspect of the job; it is unclear (and doubtful) that he had any baseball operations role. Higgins shed his on-field responsibilities and formally became executive vice president/GM at the close of the 1962 season.

During the early 1960s, Boston overhauled its farm system and scouting operation and was beginning to produce outstanding talent, but the big league Red Sox continued to struggle and attendance dwindled. Finally, during the closing days of a dispiriting 100-loss 1965 season, Yawkey fired Higgins and offered the general manager position to O'Connell on September 16.

== Architect of 'The Impossible Dream' and 1975 AL champs ==
Still seen as inexperienced in baseball operations and talent evaluation, O'Connell initially shared power with vice president, player personnel Haywood Sullivan, a former Major League catcher and manager recruited from the Kansas City Athletics in November 1965. They worked together to replace fading veterans with young players during another losing campaign in 1966.

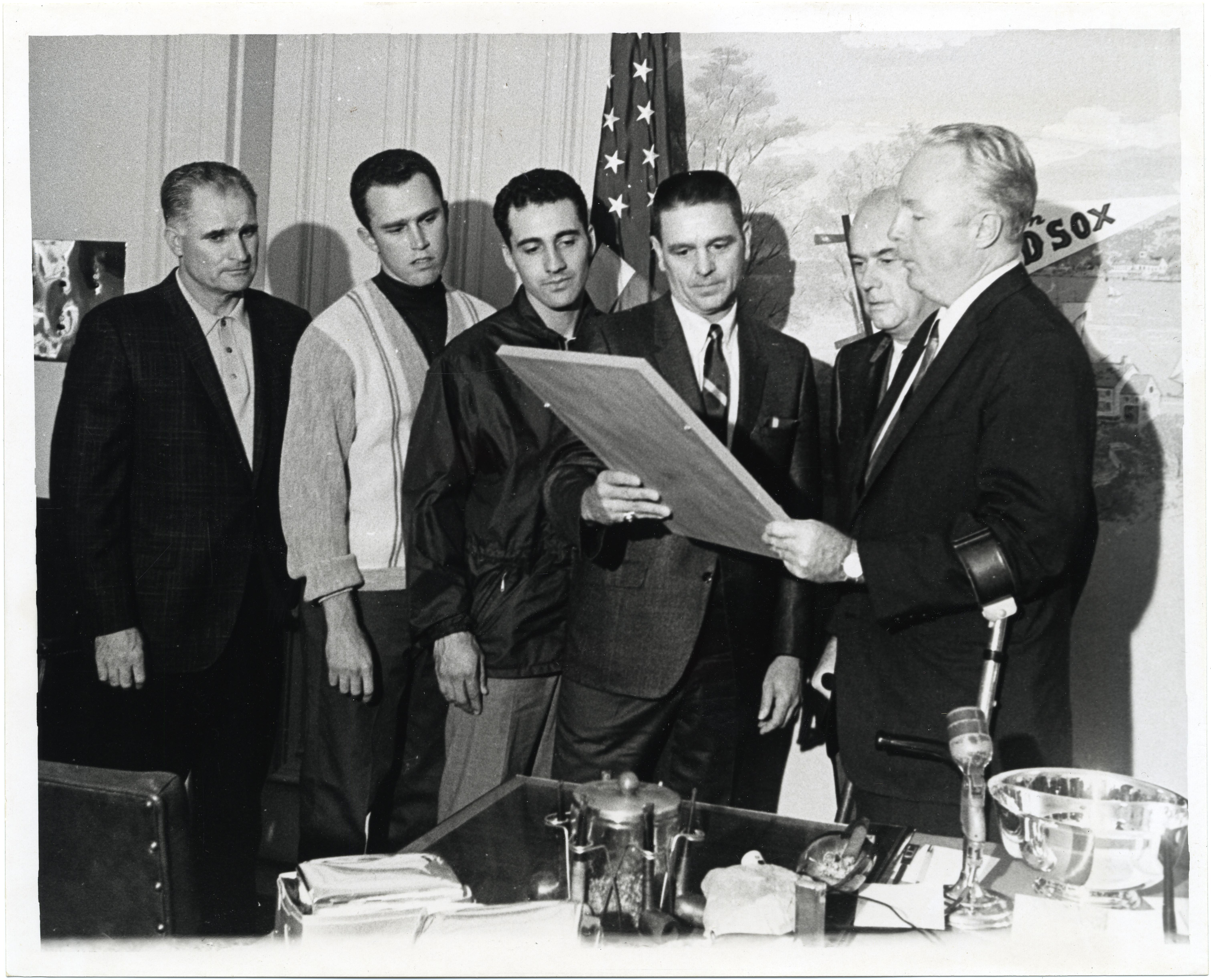
From left: Coach Bobby Doerr, Dalton Jones, Rico Petrocelli, Manager Dick Williams, O'Connell, and Mayor of Boston John F. Collins in October 1967

But by 1967 O'Connell was in full command as general manager of the Red Sox. He promoted Dick Williams to manager and traded for players such as pitcher Gary Bell, infielder Jerry Adair and catcher Elston Howard. The Red Sox, led by MVP Carl Yastrzemski and AL Cy Young Award winning pitcher Jim Lonborg, stunned the sporting world by winning the AL pennant and pushing the powerful St. Louis Cardinals to seven games in the 1967 World Series. The team's home attendance rose by 113 percent, from 811,172 in 1966 to 1,727,832. In recognition of the dramatic turnaround, O'Connell was named Executive of the Year by The Sporting News.

The Red Sox posted winning seasons from 1968 to 1974 and continued to rank among the AL leaders in home attendance, but could not match the success of the league's dominant teams of the era, the Detroit Tigers, Baltimore Orioles and Oakland Athletics. Nonetheless, Boston continued to harvest great talent from its farm system, including Carlton Fisk, Dwight Evans, Cecil Cooper, Bill Lee, John Curtis, Lynn McGlothen, Ben Oglivie, Juan Beníquez, Rogelio Moret, Rick Burleson, Jim Rice and Fred Lynn. The team also somewhat overcame its reputation for racial prejudice by increasing the number of African Americans and Latin Americans on its playing roster.

In 1975, led by rookies Lynn and Rice, the Red Sox won the AL East title, defeated defending world champion Oakland in the ALCS, and battled another NL powerhouse, the Cincinnati Reds, in a World Series. The 23-year-old Lynn was selected both Rookie of the Year and Most Valuable Player of the American League. Once again, O'Connell was hailed as Executive of the Year in Major League Baseball.

== Abrupt dismissal during ownership change ==
But O'Connell's tenure with the Red Sox and his baseball career were about to come to an end.

Tom Yawkey had developed a close friendship with Haywood Sullivan—by 1975 playing a reduced role for the Red Sox as director of amateur scouting—but trusted O'Connell to be his top baseball and business executive. The 73-year-old owner died from leukemia on July 9, 1976, nine months after the 1975 pennant. His widow and heir, Jean, was both a strong ally of Sullivan's and an adversary of O'Connell's. She criticized O'Connell's player transactions, his willingness to negotiate with (and ultimately sign to new contracts) potential free agents Fisk, Lynn and Burleson, his attempted big-money purchase of Rollie Fingers and Joe Rudi from the Oakland A's in June 1976 (vetoed within hours by Commissioner of Baseball Bowie Kuhn), and his signing of free agent relief pitcher Bill Campbell.

When Mrs. Yawkey put the club up for sale in 1977, she chose—and ultimately joined—Sullivan's ownership group, and then, on October 24, 1977, fired O'Connell as GM in favor of Sullivan, after the Red Sox won 97 games but finished 2 1/2 games behind the New York Yankees in the pennant race.

The firing ended O'Connell's baseball career, although almost six years later, on June 6, 1983, a bizarre postscript was added. A power struggle broke out among the Red Sox owners, and one of the general partners, Edward "Buddy" LeRoux, staged a coup d'état. LeRoux announced a takeover of the Red Sox, and fired Sullivan, his fellow general partner, from the GM role. Surprisingly, he unveiled O'Connell, now 68, as his choice to lead the team's front office — marking the first time O'Connell had set foot inside Fenway Park since his 1977 dismissal. But LeRoux' "coup" was halted by court order, and Sullivan remained in power. LeRoux eventually sold his share of the club in 1987, Mrs. Yawkey died in 1992, and Sullivan sold his general partnership late in 1993.

Over time, O'Connell and the Red Sox mended fences and he was admitted to the Boston Red Sox Hall of Fame in 1997. Pundits hailed him as the architect who most helped to create Red Sox Nation by bringing the team back from near-irrelevance in 1967.

By the time of his death, at age 87 on August 18, 2002, in Lexington, Massachusetts, O'Connell was recognized as one of the most important men in Red Sox annals. He was praised by author Howard Bryant, who stated in a 2004 interview with The Hardball Times, "To me, Dick O'Connell is the most underrated person in Red Sox history. He was the first Red Sox executive to look at the club and make baseball decisions and not crony decisions."
