= Buddy LeRoux =

American businessman

- LeRoux in 1963
- Born: Edward Guy LeRoux Jr. August 17, 1930; Woburn, Massachusetts, U.S.
- Died: January 7, 2008 (aged 77); Wolfeboro, New Hampshire, U.S.
- Education: Northeastern University
- Occupations: Major League Baseball team owner and executive
- Years active: 1977–1987

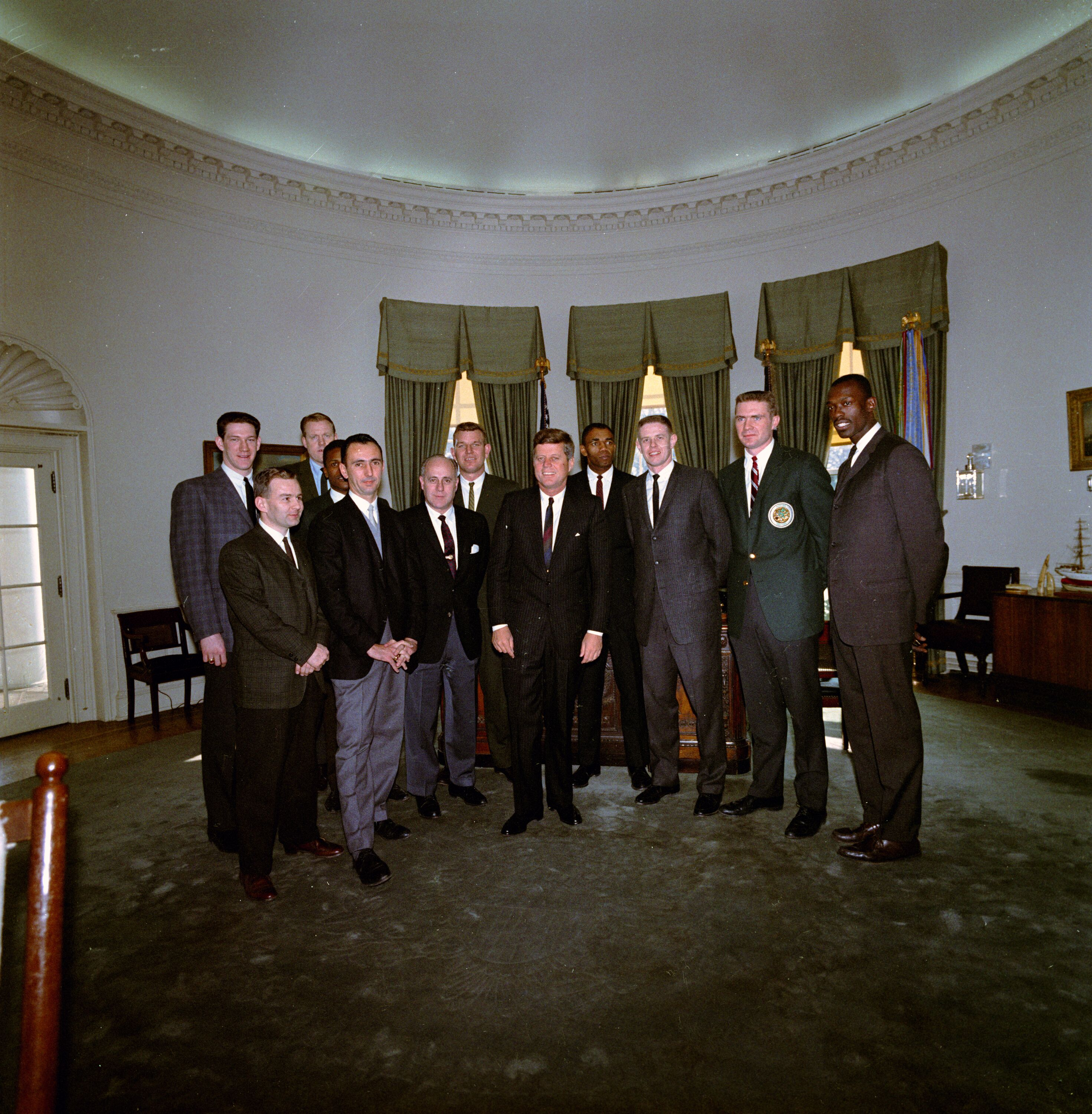
LeRoux (at front left) and Boston Celtics players with President John F. Kennedy in January 1963

Edward Guy "Buddy" LeRoux Jr. (August 17, 1930 – January 7, 2008) was an American businessman, best known for his time as a general partner of the Boston Red Sox from May 1978 through March 1987.

== Early life ==
A native of Woburn, Massachusetts, LeRoux graduated from Woburn Memorial High School and Northeastern University and was a veteran of the United States Marine Corps. He began his sporting career as an athletic trainer for the Boston Celtics (during their championship runs in the 1950s and 1960s), the Boston Bruins, and the Boston Red Sox (1966–1974). During the 1970s, he also began to flourish in the business world, successfully investing in real estate and a series of physical therapy and rehabilitation hospitals.

== Boston Red Sox general partner ==
By 1977, LeRoux was wealthy enough to assemble a group of investors seeking to purchase the Red Sox from the estate of longtime owner Tom Yawkey, who had died in 1976. Yawkey's widow, Jean, had been owner and president during much of the 1976 season.

With the backing of Rogers Badgett, a Kentucky-based coal magnate, LeRoux put together a 30-share limited partnership and then recruited Red Sox vice president Haywood Sullivan, one of Mrs. Yawkey's favorites among her husband's employees, as a member of his syndicate. On September 29, 1977, Mrs. Yawkey announced the team's sale to LeRoux and Sullivan's ownership group for $15 million. However, a lawsuit brought by an unsuccessful bidder for the Red Sox unearthed serious flaws in the sale agreement. The New York Times reported on November 20, 1977, that LeRoux and Sullivan had largely managed to gain 52 percent of the franchise due to an $8 million loan from Boston's State Street Bank, and that each man had each invested only $100,000 of their own capital in the deal.

On December 8, American League owners voted 11–3 to reject the proposed purchase. Over the next five months, both the terms of the sale and LeRoux' ownership group were restructured. Mrs. Yawkey, who had originally been a limited partner in the group, re-invested in the Red Sox and joined the LeRoux-Sullivan bid as a third general partner. The revamped bid, now valued at $20.5 million, was approved by the American League on May 23, 1978. Mrs. Yawkey's renewed prominence and role with the team were reflected when she was reappointed club president, with LeRoux as executive vice president and head of business operations. Sullivan became executive vice president, general manager and head of baseball operations. At one point, LeRoux and Badgett controlled an estimated 42 percent of Red Sox stock.

=== Takeover attempt ===
But LeRoux and his limited partners grew restive when the Red Sox fell from contention, and attendance at Fenway Park and revenues fell from prior levels. Part of the club's on-field decline was due to fiscal belt-tightening and refusal to compete aggressively for veteran talent by retaining or signing free agents, although it was not clear which general partner ordered the policy. Reportedly, the LeRoux faction wanted the team run in a more "business-like" manner, while Mrs. Yawkey sought to preserve some of the philosophies of her late husband, known as a "player-friendly" owner. LeRoux was thwarted in an attempt to sell his share in the team for $20 million to Boston businessman David Mugar, and then rejected a counter-offer from Mrs. Yawkey and Sullivan.

In 1983, the Red Sox suffered their first losing season since 1966, and the rift among the ownership factions became public. On June 6, prior to a Monday night home game against the Detroit Tigers, the Red Sox planned a special benefit for stricken former star outfielder Tony Conigliaro, who had been incapacitated at age 37 by a heart attack in January 1982. Conigliaro's old teammates from the 1967 "Impossible Dream" Red Sox assembled for a pre-game ceremony, and a crowd of nearly 24,000 gathered, one of the largest gates at Fenway Park since Opening Day. Boston's television stations had crews in place to cover "Tony C Night."

Prior to the festivities, LeRoux called a press conference and announced that he and a majority bloc of the team's limited partners, chiefly Badgett and Albert Curran, were exercising language in their partnership agreement to overthrow Sullivan and Yawkey and take command of the club. He announced a "reorganization of internal management" and appointed himself managing general partner, while bringing in former Red Sox general manager Dick O'Connell to replace Sullivan as head of baseball operations. Boston media immediately dubbed the gambit the "Coup LeRoux."

=== Takeover failure ===
The two ousted general partners immediately filed suit against LeRoux, were granted an injunction, and then battled him in court over the next 12 months. The trial revealed unflattering details about all the principals: it was learned that LeRoux and his faction were in secret negotiations to buy the Cleveland Indians while still involved with the Red Sox and LeRoux's legal team heaped criticism upon the management decisions of Mrs. Yawkey and Sullivan.

In early June 1984, the legal fight ended with an appeals court ruling against LeRoux. He was removed as the team's executive vice president, administration, and his allies were purged from management. In late 1985, Jean Yawkey bought out Badgett, Curran and LeRoux's own limited partnership (which reportedly fetched $2 million). On March 30, 1987, Mrs. Yawkey acquired LeRoux's general partnership for a reported $7 million to become majority general partner in the team.

== Later life ==
Following the failed takeover attempt, LeRoux largely faded from the public eye, although from 1986 to 1989 he did own Boston's Suffolk Downs, a Thoroughbred racetrack. By the late 1980s, he had filed assets of $100 million, "including oil wells, greyhound racing dogs and antique cars." In December 1986, LeRoux began negotiations to purchase the New England Patriots, Foxboro Stadium, and a lease on Foxboro Raceway. However, due to a lack of progress on the deal, he withdraw his offer on March 17, 1987.

LeRoux died at age 77 on January 7, 2008, in Wolfeboro, New Hampshire. He was survived by his wife and three children.

Sporting positions
Preceded by Jean Yawkey	Owner of the Boston Red Sox; September 30, 1977 – March 31, 1987 (with Jean Yawkey and Haywood Sullivan)	Succeeded by Jean Yawkey (with Haywood Sullivan)
