= Jean R. Yawkey =

American philanthropist and Major League Baseball owner (1909–1992)

- Born: January 24, 1909; Brooklyn, New York, U.S.
- Died: February 26, 1992 (aged 83); Boston, Massachusetts, U.S.
- Occupation: Owner of the Boston Red Sox (1976–1992)
- Spouse: Tom Yawkey
- Awards: Boston Red Sox Hall of Fame (1995)

Jean Remington Yawkey (January 24, 1909 – February 26, 1992) was the wife of Tom Yawkey and owner of the Boston Red Sox from 1976 to her death in 1992.

== Biography ==
Jean Yawkey was born Jean Hollander in Brooklyn, New York. She grew up in Freeport, Long Island, and was a New York City fashion model for ten years. In December 1944, she married Tom Yawkey in Georgetown, South Carolina; both had previous marriages that ended in divorce. During World War II, she was active with the Red Cross.

Tom Yawkey purchased the Boston Red Sox in 1933 and following his death in 1976, Jean Yawkey was chairwoman of the board of directors of the JRY Corporation, the majority owner and general partner of the Red Sox, until her death.

In 1983, Jean Yawkey became a director of the National Baseball Hall of Fame and Museum in Cooperstown, New York, holding the distinction of being the first woman elected to the board.

In 1992, Jean Yawkey died in Boston at age 83. In total, the Yawkeys owned (solely, or with partners) and operated the team for 59 years. Jean Yawkey was inducted to the Boston Red Sox Hall of Fame in 1995.

=== Philanthropy ===
Philanthropy

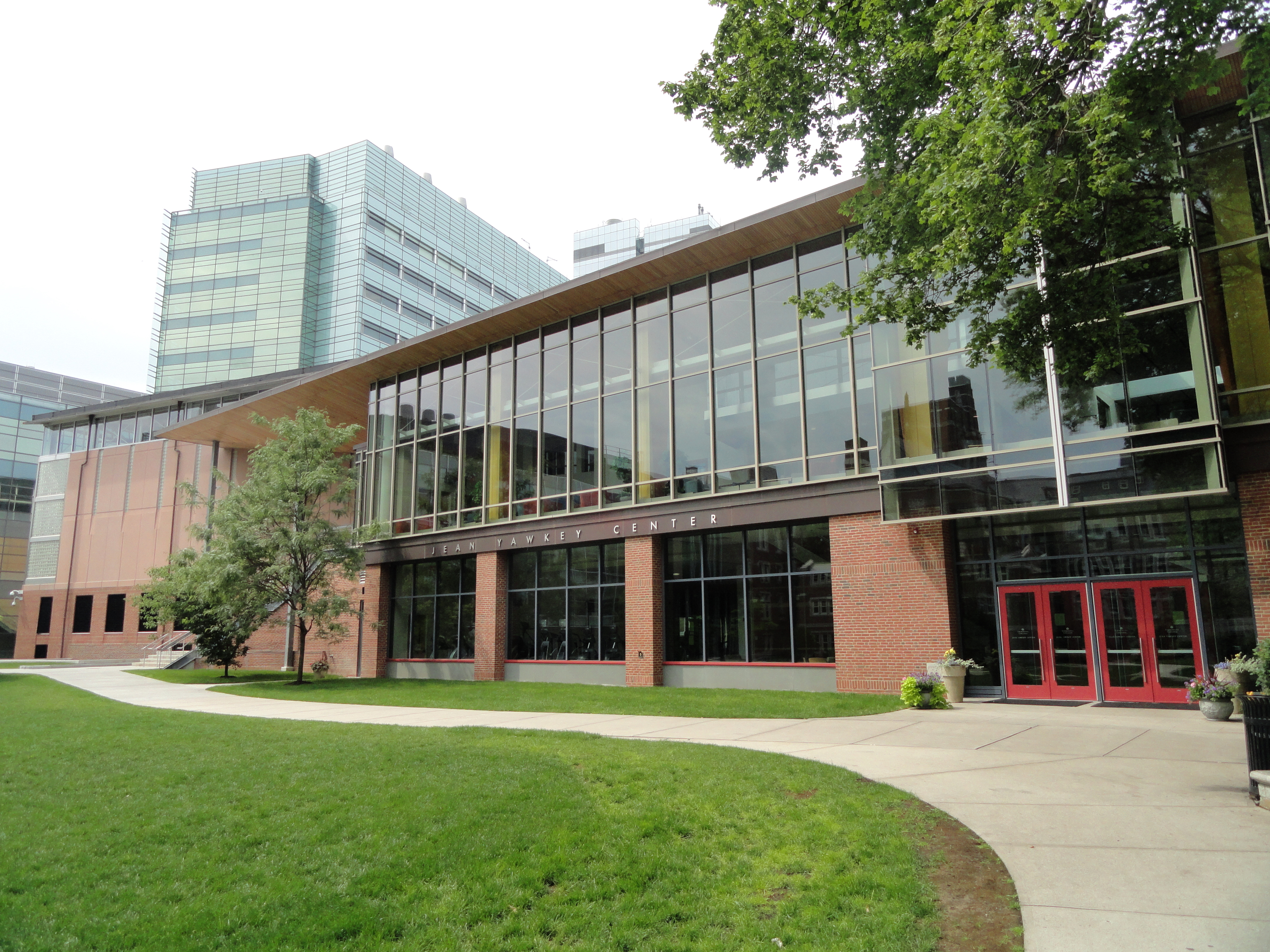
Jean Yawkey Center at Emmanuel College

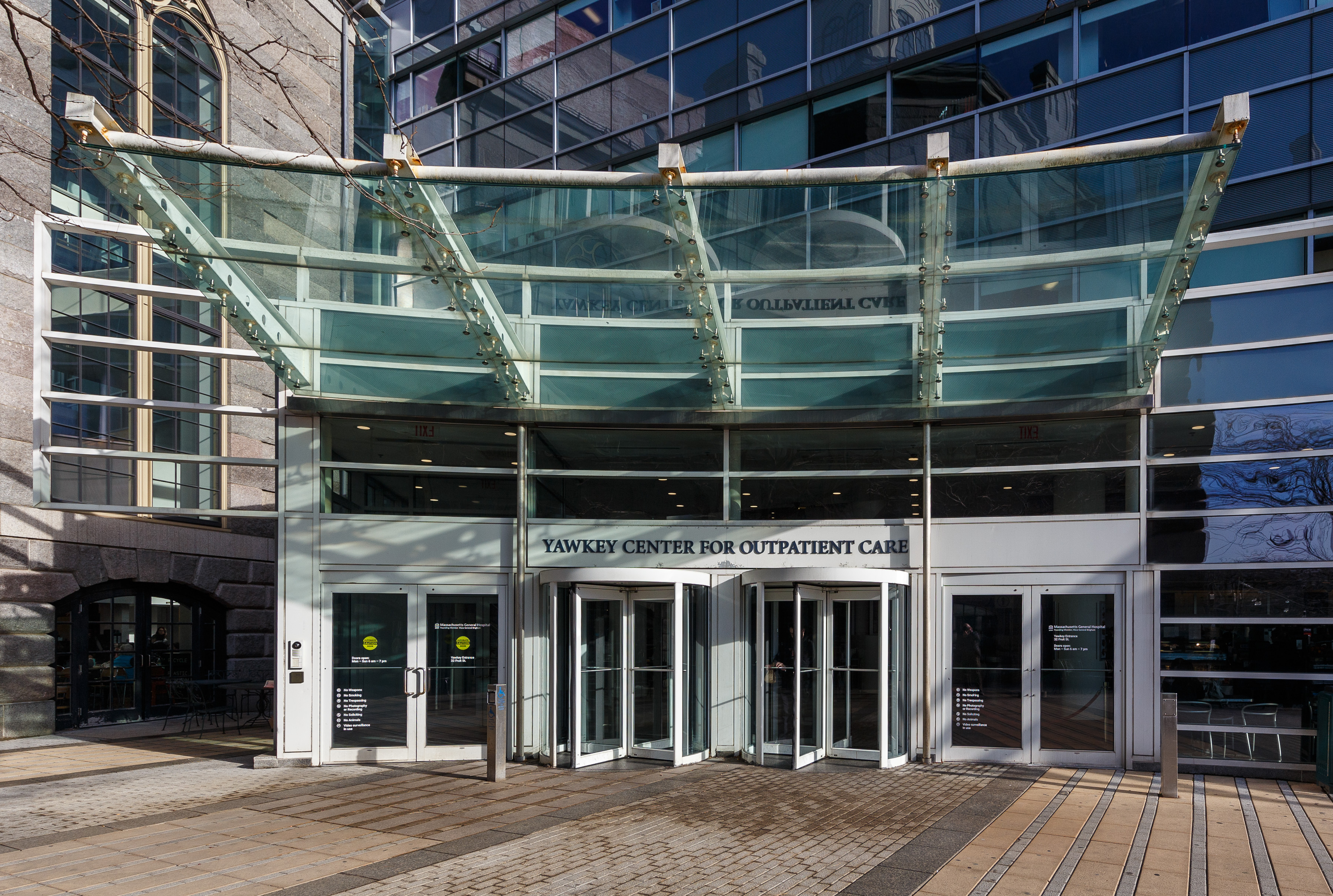
Yawkey Center at Massachusetts General Hospital

Jean Yawkey had a long association with the Jimmy Fund/Dana–Farber Cancer Institute as a trustee and for a period as chair. She was a supporter of the Tara Hall Home for Boys in South Carolina. She was instrumental in the establishment of the Yawkey Family Inn in Brookline, Massachusetts, a temporary home for families of patients undergoing transplant surgery in Boston-area hospitals. She was also a trustee of the Yawkey Foundation.

==== Yawkey Foundation ====
The Yawkey Foundation has given over $575 million in grants to organizations in the areas of health care, education, athletics, the arts, and wildlife conservation. The foundation established scholarship funds at Yale University, Boston College, and Boston College High School. She was a supporter of the Jackie Robinson Scholarship Program and supported several other educational institutions to provide minority students and others with scholarship aid.

In 2002, the Yawkey Foundation provided a $25 million grant for the construction of an outpatient center at Massachusetts General Hospital, where she had been a patient, and where she died in 1992. In 2003, the Yawkey Foundation awarded $5 million to Emmanuel College in Boston for construction of the Jean Yawkey Center, a student center, dining hall, gym and fitness center.

=== Boston Red Sox ===
The team's most successful season during Jean Yawkey's ownership came in 1986, when the Red Sox reached the World Series, losing in seven games to the New York Mets.

Ownership:	July 9, 1976 – February 26, 1992 with Buddy LeRoux: September 30, 1977 – March 31, 1987 with Haywood Sullivan: September 30, 1977 – February 26, 1992
Predecessor:	Tom Yawkey
Successor:	JRY Trust
Titles:	AL East: 1986, 1988, 1990; AL Pennant: 1986
General manager(s):	Dick O'Connell (1976–1977); Haywood Sullivan (1977–1984); Lou Gorman (1984–1992)
Manager(s):	Don Zimmer (1976–1980); Johnny Pesky (1980); Ralph Houk (1981–1984); John McNamara (1985–1988); Joe Morgan (1988–1991); Butch Hobson (1991–1992)

== See also ==
- Women in baseball
- List of female Major League Baseball principal owners

Sporting positions
Preceded by Tom Yawkey	Owner of the Boston Red Sox; July 9, 1976 – February 26, 1992 (with Haywood Sullivan, September 30, 1977 – February 26, 1992) (with Buddy LeRoux, September 30, 1977 – March 31, 1987)	Succeeded by JRY Trust
Preceded by Tom Yawkey	Boston Red Sox President; 1976–1987	Succeeded by John Harrington
