= John W. Henry =

American sports team owner (born 1949)

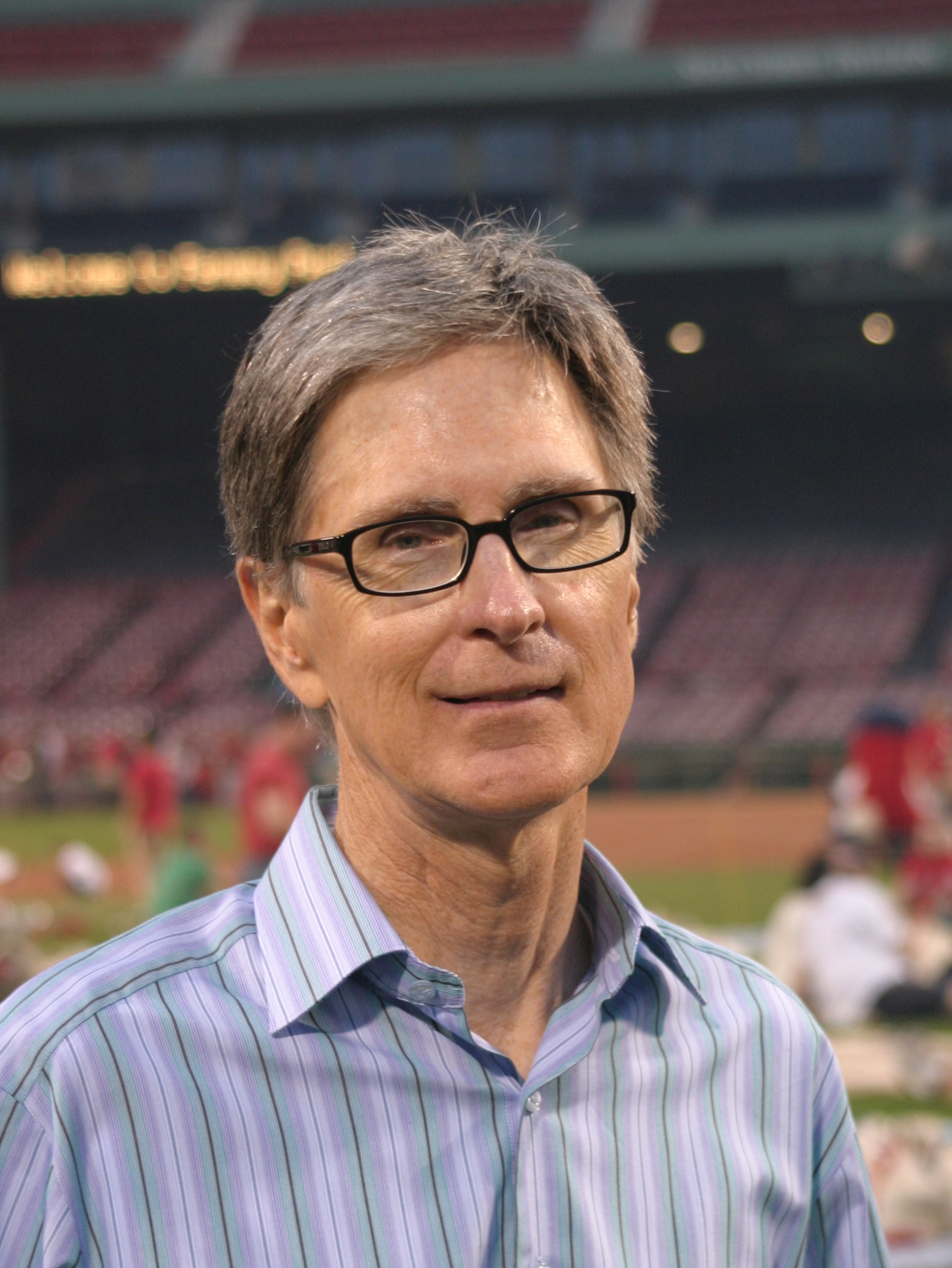
- Henry in 2008
- Born: John William Henry II; September 13, 1949 (age 77); Quincy, Illinois, U.S.
- Education: Victor Valley College (dropped out); University of California (dropped out)
- Occupations: Principal owner of Boston Red Sox; Liverpool F.C. The Boston Globe; Co-owner of RFK Racing
- Spouse: Linda Pizzuti Henry (m. 2009)
- Children: 3

John William Henry II (born September 13, 1949) is an American businessman and the founder of John W. Henry & Company, an investment management firm. He is the principal owner of Liverpool Football Club, the Boston Red Sox, The Boston Globe, co-owner of RFK Racing and former owner of the Pittsburgh Penguins. As of October 2024, Forbes estimated his net worth to be US$5.7 billion.

== Early life and education ==
Henry was born to Charles Sumner Henry Sr. and Sue Henry (née Kelly) on September 13, 1949, in Quincy, Illinois. His parents were soybean farmers, and he split his time growing up between Illinois and Arkansas.

At age 15, his asthmatic condition prompted his family to move to Apple Valley, California, where Henry attended and graduated from Victor Valley High School in Victorville, California.

Henry then attended but did not graduate from four separate colleges and universities, Victor Valley College, and then University of California, Riverside, University of California, Irvine, and UCLA, where he majored in philosophy.

He attributes not graduating to the time he spent performing and touring with two bands, Elysian Fields and Hillary.

== Career ==
Henry started trading corn and soybean futures to learn the basics of hedging the price risk of holding an inventory of these commodities, whether in storage or out in the field. In 1976, a commodities broker at Reynolds Securities asked him to advise other farmers, but he declined. After spending a summer in Norway with his first wife, Mai, Henry developed a mechanical trend following method for managing a futures trading account. He tested his trend-reversal method—which was never out of the market but always held a position (either long or short) in every one of the markets in the account's "basket" of commodities—"using his own money," according to his marketing materials from 1983.

When that test proved successful, he founded John W. Henry & Company in 1981, opened a small office across the street from the airport in Irvine, California, and began marketing his management to the largest commodity brokerage firms in America. That proved so successful by 1983 that he moved to considerably larger quarters at Fashion Island in Newport Beach. In 1989, Henry moved to Westport, Connecticut.

=== JWH ===
JWH was established in 1981 and began taking retail clients in 1982. The firm's management methods make mechanical, non-discretionary trading decisions in response to systematic determinations of reversals in each market's direction, with the explicit intention of precluding not only human emotion, but also any subjective evaluation of factors outside of price behavior, such as the fundamentals, to trigger each decision to be long or short each market, or not.

In March 2025, Boston magazine estimated Henry's net worth at $5.5 billion, but also reported that his firm had experienced recent difficulties.

On November 9, 2012, the firm announced that it would stop managing clients' money by December 31, 2012, and Henry confirmed that total assets under the firm's management had fallen from $2.5 billion in 2006 to less than $100 million as of late 2012.

=== Sports ownership ===
Henry grew up a fan of the St. Louis Cardinals, especially their star Stan Musial. After acquiring his fortune, his first foray into professional sports was in purchasing a Minor League Baseball team, the Tucson Toros of the Pacific Coast League, in 1989. He was also one of the founders of the Senior Professional Baseball Association, a winter league in Florida composed of retired major league players.

Henry co-owned the winning team in the 1989–90 season, the West Palm Beach Tropics, managed by Dick Williams, former manager of the Boston Red Sox's 1967 team, known as the "Impossible Dream" team.

In 1990, Henry sold his interest in the team, and the league went out of business the following year. The same year, he negotiated to purchase the Orlando Magic, a National Basketball Association team. He also was briefly the lead general for the Colorado Rockies, a Major League Baseball expansion team, and headed a group attempting to acquire the National Hockey League's expansion team in Florida, which was ultimately awarded to Phil and Tony Esposito, who created the Tampa Bay Lightning. Henry subsequently negotiated to buy the Miami Heat and later the New Jersey Nets.

Henry entered Major League Baseball with his purchase of a small interest in the New York Yankees in 1991. Henry became the sole owner of the Florida Marlins in 1999, purchasing the club from Wayne Huizenga for a reported $158 million. In January 2002, Henry sold the Marlins in a multi-franchise deal to Jeffrey Loria, then owner of the Montreal Expos, which is now the Washington Nationals.

==== Fenway Sports Group ====
In 2001, Henry partnered with Tom Werner, The New York Times Company, and other investors to found New England Sports Ventures (NESV) in a successful bid to buy the Boston Red Sox from Yawkey Trust headed by John Harrington. Henry became principal owner of the Red Sox, with Werner as chairman.

The company has since become majority owner of English Premier League club Liverpool F.C., the Pittsburgh Penguins, the New England Sports Network, Fenway Park, Fenway Sports Management, and other assets.

In 2009, the company made its first foray into European sports with an unsuccessful bid for the French Ligue 1 club Olympique de Marseille.

NESV changed its name to Fenway Sports Group in March 2011.

==== Boston Red Sox ====
Henry canceled the previous owners' plans to demolish Fenway Park and build a new stadium next door. Instead, Henry renovated Fenway—among other things, adding seats over the Green Monster—enabling the park to celebrate its centennial in 2012.

Henry and Werner assembled a front-office team headed by Larry Lucchino with the goal of "breaking the Curse of the Bambino." He also hired baseball sabermetrics pioneer Bill James, whose work became widely known after the 2003 publication of Moneyball. Henry accomplished his goal in the 2004 World Series, defeating his former childhood favorite Cardinals. The team won the 2007 World Series against a franchise with which Henry had pre-expansion involvement, the Rockies, and the 2018 World Series against the Dodgers. The Sox beat the Cardinals again in the 2013 World Series.

In August 2017, Henry said the team would lead a campaign to change the name of Yawkey Way, a section of Boston where Fenway Park is located. The Red Sox had been the last team in Major League Baseball to integrate, and Henry said, "I am still haunted by what went on here a long time before we arrived." The change was approved by the City of Boston in April 2018, and the name reverted to Jersey Street in May 2018.

==== Liverpool Football Club ====
In October 2010 the Fenway Sports Group took over Liverpool F.C. The UEFA Financial Fair Play Regulations may have been a factor in the decision. The previous owners, Tom Hicks and George N. Gillett, Jr., had become extremely unpopular among Liverpool fans for their failure to deliver on the promise that no debt would be placed onto the club, and the proposal of Liverpool leaving Anfield as disrespectful treatment of its manager and front office and for their allegedly misleading statements about planned and past investment in players.

After losing around £154 million on the pressured sale of their debt-ridden club, Hicks and Gillett announced that they would sue co-owners and creditors for at least $1.6 billion for the "extraordinary swindle" they suffered. In January 2013, Hicks and Gillett had lost a Court of Appeal case and agreed to drop the suit.

On February 26, 2012, Liverpool won the 2012 Football League Cup Final at Wembley Stadium, beating Cardiff City 3–2 on penalties after the game finished 1–1 after 90 minutes and 2–2 after extra time. This was Liverpool's first trophy since the 2006 FA Cup Final win over West Ham United on May 13, 2006, at the Millennium Stadium in Cardiff. In May 2012 he made a controversial decision by firing coach and club icon Kenny Dalglish citing the club's poor league results. This was regarded as a poor decision by some soccer pundits such as Dalglish's friend Alan Hansen, given Dalglish's success in lifting the club from four points above the relegation zone to a cup win. In July 2012, after persuading Brendan Rodgers to become the new coach, Henry attributed parting company with Dalglish as being unrelated to failing to win the FA Cup or the Suarez case, but a product of the club's poor league performance in the second half of the 2011–12 season.

Rodgers almost took Liverpool to their first Premier League title in over 20 years during the 2013–14 season; however, poor performances in the subsequent season and a bad start to the 2015–16 season saw Henry sack Brendan Rodgers as Liverpool coach on October 4, 2015. On October 8, 2015, Henry appointed Jürgen Klopp as the new coach of Liverpool F.C. The move was praised by Liverpool supporters and seen as a show of Henry's ambition for the club. Klopp led Liverpool to two finals during the 2015–16 season (the League Cup and the Europa League). In 2018 Liverpool reached the Champions League final for the first time in 11 years. In 2019 Liverpool reached the Champions League Final for the second consecutive year and won it, beating fellow English club Tottenham Hotspur, 2–0. Liverpool went on to win the Premier League title in the 2019–20 season; Liverpool's first league title in 30 years, and their first since the Premier League was formed.

In April 2021, Liverpool were announced as a founding member of the European Super League, which would have effectively ended the pyramid system of European soccer and placed Liverpool in a closed league without prospects for meritocratic relegation and promotion. Liverpool and the five other English clubs involved backed out within two days after a strong backlash. This prompted Henry to issue an official apology to Liverpool fans, taking responsibility for the events that had occurred.

==== NASCAR ====
In 2007, Henry's Fenway Sports Group bought a 50% stake in Jack Roush's Roush Racing stock car racing team. Driver Matt Kenseth won the Auto Club 500 at the California Speedway in February 2007 marking Henry's first win as an owner. In February 2009 the team won their first Daytona 500 with Matt Kenseth. Henry is currently listed as the owner of the #17 Ford driven by NASCAR Cup Series driver Chris Buescher.

==== iRacing.com Motorsport Simulations ====
In September 2004 Henry and David Kaemmer founded iRacing.com Motorsport Simulations for developing a racing simulation service aimed at both real-world racers and racing simulator enthusiasts. The service was launched in August 2008.

=== Newspaper ownership ===
In the predawn hours of August 3, 2013, both The Boston Globe and The New York Times carried stories on their web sites reporting that Henry had agreed to purchase the former along with the Telegram & Gazette newspaper of Worcester, Massachusetts, and related New England media properties for $70 million in cash from The New York Times Company, which paid $1.1 billion for The Globe in 1993. The Globe's story described Henry as "a personally shy businessman with a history of bold bets." The Times story quoted Times spokesperson Eileen Murphy as confirming the sale deal.

The stories noted that Henry had initially been among a group of partners who had joined in bidding on The Globe properties, but ended up agreeing to acquire them individually. However, The Times story reported him saying: "In coming days there will be announcements concerning those joining me in this community commitment and effort."

After the announcement, the ownership of The San Diego Union-Tribune (then known as "U-T San Diego") alleged that it had outbid Henry for The Globe but that the management of The Times Company had not fairly handled the process, to the detriment of Times Company shareholders.

In 2014, Henry sold the Worcester Telegram & Gazette to Halifax Media Group, which had previously purchased 16 former New York Times Company newspapers in 2011.

== Awards and honors ==
- Four-time World Series champion as principal owner of the Boston Red Sox
- 2024 Golden Plate Award of the American Academy of Achievement, presented by guitarist and founder of Led Zeppelin, Jimmy Page

== Personal life ==
In May 2007, Henry filed for divorce in Florida from second wife, Peggy Sue Henry. Court documents showed that she had asked for child support and alimony, and disputed her husband's claim that the couple had prenuptial agreement. The two had been married for 13 years, and had a daughter.

Also in 2007, Henry bought the Brookline home of Frank McCourt, the former owner of the Los Angeles Dodgers. He had the home demolished and replaced it with a 35,000-square-foot mansion.

In 2009, Henry married Linda Pizzuti, a 30-year-old real estate developer. As of early 2012, the couple had a daughter and a son.

In 2018, Henry put up for sale, for $25 million, an estate in Boca Raton, Florida, where he had built a primary residence, completed in 1995, and renovated in 2014. In 2019, the selling price of the 41,010-square-foot home was reduced to $15 million.

Henry enjoys playing baseball simulation games, including Out of the Park Baseball.

== In popular culture ==
Henry was briefly portrayed by Arliss Howard in the 2011 film Moneyball, which follows Oakland Athletics general manager Billy Beane and his quest to build a winning team in 2002. Towards the end of the film, Beane travels to Boston's Fenway Park where he meets with Henry, who wants Beane to become the new GM of the Red Sox.

The film depicts Beane turning down a five-year, $12.5 million contract with the Boston Red Sox and returning to the Oakland Athletics, but adds that the Red Sox, despite failing to hire Beane, implemented many of his "Moneyball" ideas and went on to win the 2004 World Series, marking the first Red Sox championship in 86 years.

== See also ==
- Elysian (yacht)
- Stat (website) (Founder: John W. Henry)

Preceded by JRY Trust	Owner of the Boston Red Sox; December 20, 2001 – present (via Fenway Sports Group)	Succeeded by incumbent
