= Tom Yawkey =

American industrialist (1903–1976)

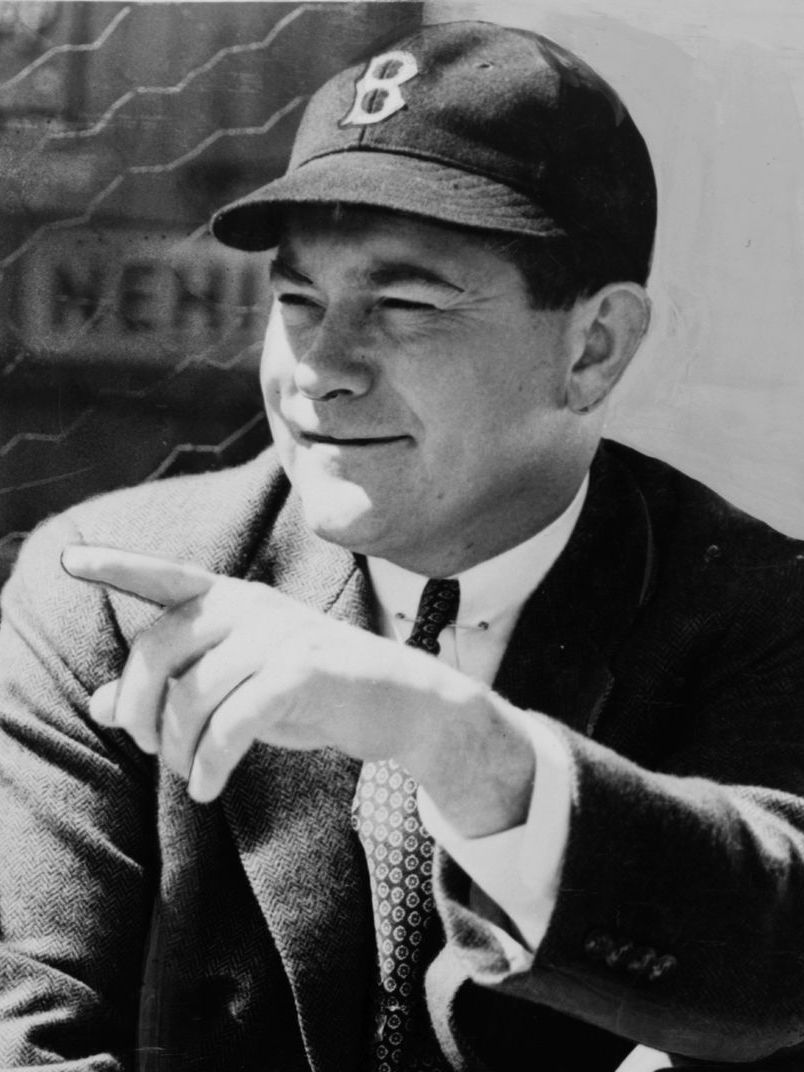
- Yawkey in 1938
- Born: Thomas Yawkey Austin; February 21, 1903; Detroit, Michigan, U.S.
- Died: July 9, 1976 (aged 73); Boston, Massachusetts, U.S.
- Education: Yale University
- Occupation: Baseball executive
- Known for: Owner of the Boston Red Sox (1933–1976)
- Spouse: Elise Sparrow (m. 1925; div. 1944) Jean Hiller (m. 1944)
- Children: 1
- Relatives: Bill Yawkey (uncle)
- Baseball career

Member of the National

Baseball Hall of Fame
- Induction: 1980
- Election method: Veterans Committee

Thomas Austin Yawkey (born Thomas Yawkey Austin; February 21, 1903 – July 9, 1976) was an American industrialist and Major League Baseball executive. Born in Detroit, Yawkey became president of the Boston Red Sox in 1933 and was the sole owner of the team for 44 seasons until he died of leukemia. He was elected to the Baseball Hall of Fame in 1980.

== Early life ==
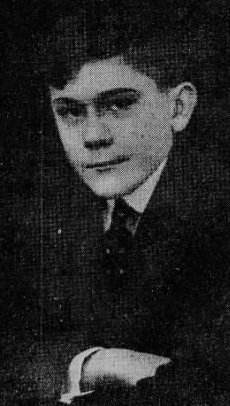
Yawkey, c. 1919

Yawkey was born in Detroit on February 21, 1903, to insurance executive Thomas J. Austin and his wife Augusta. Augusta was the eldest child of William Clyman Yawkey, who had become wealthy in the lumber and iron ore industries of the Midwestern United States. In addition to these interests, William Clyman Yawkey had agreed to buy the Detroit Tigers baseball team in 1903, but died before the deal closed. His son, William H. "Bill" Yawkey, completed the purchase with Frank Navin in late 1903.

When Yawkey was about six months old, his father died. After his father's death, Yawkey and his mother moved to New York City to live with his uncle, William Yawkey. Throughout his life, Yawkey maintained a residence in New York City. In September 1918, William adopted 15-year-old Tom after his mother died. His last name was changed to Yawkey after the adoption.

Bill Yawkey died in 1919 and left half of his $40 million (roughly $644 million in 2022) estate to Tom. A clause in the will created two trusts that he gained access to at 25 and 30 years old. Yawkey graduated from the Irving School in Tarrytown, NY in 1920 and from the Sheffield Scientific School at Yale University in 1925. While at Yale, Yawkey was a member of the Phi Gamma Delta fraternity.

== Boston Red Sox ==
Having met as alumni of the Irving School, Yawkey and Eddie Collins, a former Philadelphia Athletics second baseman, discussed purchasing a baseball team in 1933, when Yawkey was due to turn 30 and gain full access to his fortune. Collins found a potential target in the Boston Red Sox, who had spent the last fourteen years as one of the worst teams in baseball. Former owner Harry Frazee had been forced to sell most of his best players to the New York Yankees due to chronic cash shorts. His successor, Bob Quinn, had been grossly underfinanced since the illness and death of a major investor. By the 1932–33 offseason, Quinn was so strapped that he had to borrow against his life insurance to send the team to spring training.

Collins arranged a meeting between Quinn and Yawkey during the 1932 World Series; he later agreed to come to the Red Sox if Yawkey purchased the team. On February 25, 1933, Yawkey bought the Red Sox for $1.25 million, five days after Yawkey turned 30. He became team president, giving Collins control of day-to-day operations as vice president and general manager (posts Collins held until 1947).

Yawkey inherited a team that had finished the 1932 season with a record of 43–111 (.279), the worst in franchise history. Yawkey and Collins attempted to build a successful team by acquiring talented players. He also spent $1.5 million on repairs to Fenway Park, giving it much of its present look.

In 1934, the Red Sox reached a winning percentage of .500 for the first time since winning the 1918 World Series. In 1937, they achieved a first winning record for the first time since 1918, and in 1938 they finished in the first division for the first time since 1918. When it became apparent that buying top level major league players wasn't enough to surpass the Yankees and Detroit Tigers, Yawkey began building a minor-league system as well.

Under Yawkey, the Jimmy Fund became the official charity of the team in 1953. In 1957, Yawkey was elected chairman of the Jimmy Fund's board of trustees and helped establish the tradition of the Red Sox playing exhibition games to raise money for the fund.

Yawkey spent millions in his effort to build winning teams. In the first seven years of his ownership, the Red Sox lost $1.7 million, more than he had paid to buy the team. Yawkey spent around an additional $3 million during that time on buying players, renovating Fenway Park, and other capital expenses. In 1974, Yawkey estimated his ownership of the team had cost him over $10 million. The Red Sox won the American League pennant in 1946 (their first pennant since 1918), 1967, and 1975, but then went on to lose each World Series in seven games, against the St. Louis Cardinals (1946, 1967) and the Cincinnati Reds (1975). Yawkey never achieved his goal of winning a world championship.

According to two anonymous sources in an article by Jeff Passan in 2011, Yawkey kept Donald Fitzpatrick, an equipment manager for the Red Sox, employed despite private allegations of sexual assault against Fitzpatrick. However, no public allegations against Fitzpatrick were made until 1991, 15 years after Yawkey's death.

=== Racism and racial integration of the Red Sox ===
The Red Sox were the first MLB team to sign a Mexican-born player, fielding Mel Almada on September 8, 1933. However, they were the last major league team to add a black player to their roster, allegedly due to Yawkey and the managers he hired being racists.

According to the Boston Herald, as owner of the Boston Red Sox, the team's integration policy was Yawkey's responsibility. In 1945, Red Sox held a farce tryout chiefly designed to assuage the desegregationist sensibilities of powerful Boston City Councilman Isadore H. Y. Muchnick. Jackie Robinson, who would later play for the Brooklyn Dodgers, was subjected to racial epithets by management and left the tryout humiliated.

Attempts to integrate between 1945 and 1959 were unsuccessful. Joe Cronin, general manager after Eddie Collins, scouted black players, including Sam Jethroe, Larry Doby and Bill Greason but none signed with the team. In 1950, the team signed Lorenzo Piper Davis, their first black player, for their minor league team, but he was released in May of that year. Three years later, the team signed Earl Wilson to their minor league team, but his career was interrupted by serving in the Marines in 1957. Wilson would later return to the Sox's Minneapolis farm team after completing his military service and be fielded by the Sox in July 1959.

In 1956, The Boston Globe published an article discussing the Red Sox's lack of black players on the team, in which manager Joe Cronin denied prejudice allegations. The article reported that the Red Sox had made an offer of $115,000 for Charlie Neal in 1954, but the offer was rejected.

Despite the Red Sox having multiple black players in their farm system during the 1950s, the team did not promote any of them to the major league until 1959. On July 21, 1959, Pumpsie Green, who was signed by the team in 1955, made his debut, making the Red Sox the final major league team to integrate its roster.

In 1967, the Red Sox fielded a team with a starting lineup including multiple black players, such as George Scott and Reggie Smith. However, the Red Sox did not sign any black free agents between the 1976 start of the free agency system and 1993, thereby missing out on a substantial portion of top baseball talent during that 17-year period.

== Death and legacy ==
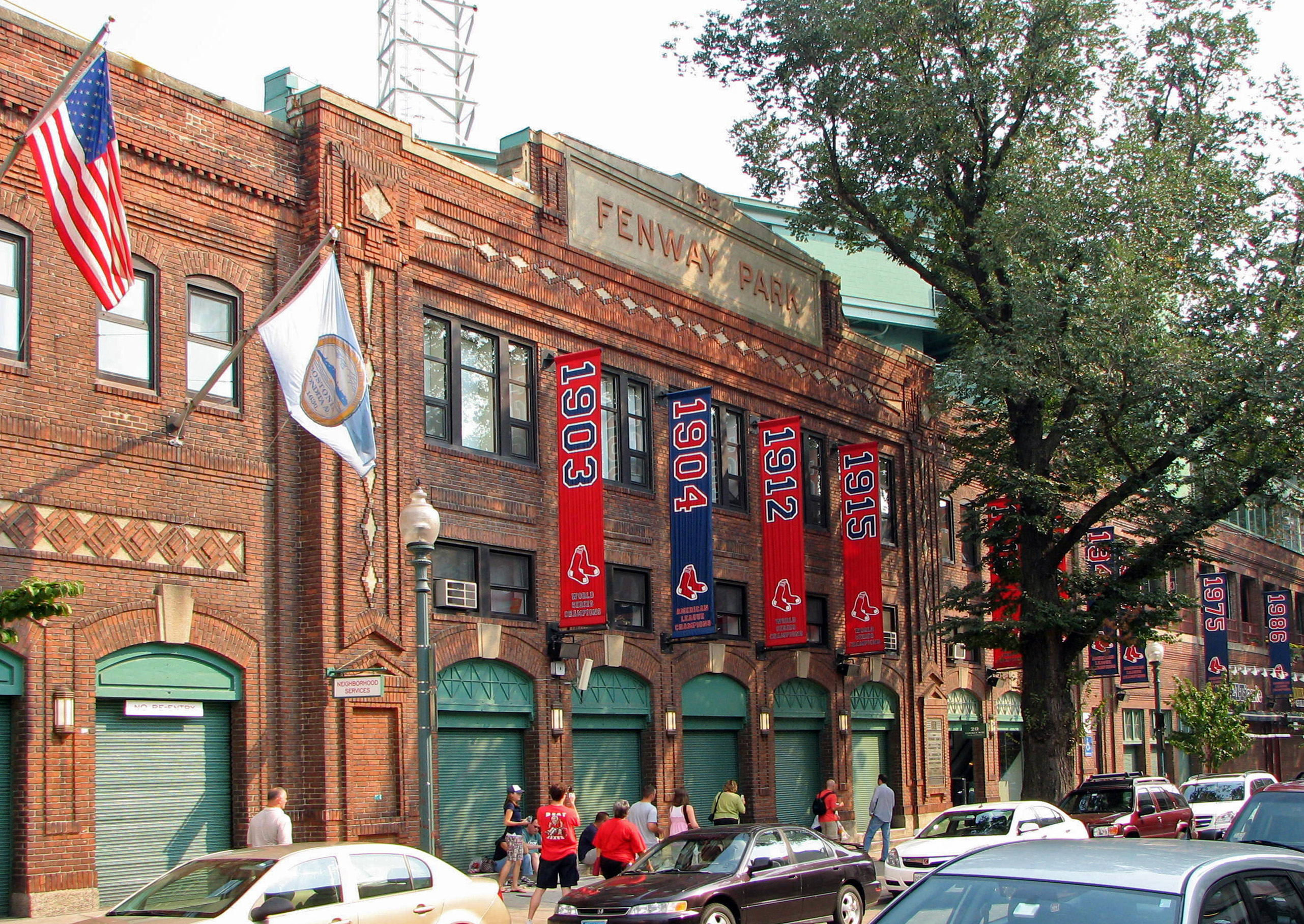
Fenway Park main entrance on the then Yawkey Way in 2007

Yawkey died from leukemia in Boston on July 9, 1976. His wife, Jean R. Yawkey, became president of the club following his death. Yawkey was posthumously inducted into the Baseball Hall of Fame in 1980.

=== The Yawkey Foundation ===
The Yawkey Foundation was established in 1976 through a bequest in his will. Yawkey set aside $10 million in his will, which was probated in New York, to establish the foundation. In 1982, Jean Yawkey created a second Yawkey Foundation.

In 2002, the original Foundation donated $25 million to Massachusetts General Hospital to build an outpatient center, and recorded $420 million in 2002 income after the sale of the Red Sox.

In 2003, the Foundation donated $15 million to Boston Medical Center, a safety net hospital, to build the Moakley Cancer Care Building.

In 2005, the Foundation created the Yawkey Scholars Program to award college scholarships to students with demonstrated financial need.

In 2007, the Yawkey Foundations donated $30 million for the Dana–Farber Cancer Institute to build the Yawkey Center for Cancer Care in Boston.

In 2008, the original Foundation supported the building of a new home, Jean Yawkey Place, for the Boston Health Care for the Homeless program.

In 2013, the Foundation awarded $10 million to the Museum of Science for a gallery and $3 million to Cape Cod Healthcare for an emergency center.

In 2014, The Foundation gave a $10 million donation to Boston University to support a paid internship program for students to work at nonprofits.

In 2018, the Foundation donated $10 million to Tidelands Georgetown Memorial Hospital to expand the facility. Yawkey donated $100,000 to build the original hospital in 1945.

In June 2021, the Foundation donated $5 million to Franciscan Children's new mental health center.

=== Yawkey Way ===
In 1977, the section of Jersey Street where Fenway Park is located was renamed Yawkey Way in his honor. However, in August 2017, due to Yawkey's alleged history of racism and discrimination against black players, the Red Sox principal owner John W. Henry announced the team was seeking to change the name of the street. The following year, Henry publicly distanced the team from Yawkey, citing that he was "haunted by what went on here a long time before we arrived," referring to the team being the last in the major leagues to integrate under Tom Yawkey's guidance.

The change was unanimously approved by the Boston Public Improvement Commission in April 2018, and the name reverted to Jersey Street in May 2018. Also in May, a plaque commemorating Yawkey from "his Red Sox employees," that had hung at the administrative office entrance to Fenway Park since shortly after his death was removed. In April 2019, the MBTA Commuter Rail station near the park, Yawkey station, was renamed Lansdowne station.

=== Tom Yawkey Wildlife Center Heritage Preserve ===
Through his will, Yawkey donated three coastal islands in Georgetown, South Carolina, to the state to create a wildlife preserve. The preserve covers more than 20,000 acres (81 km^{2}) of land and consists of North Island, South Island and a majority of Cat Island. It is managed by the South Carolina Department of Natural Resources.

In 1919, when Yawkey was 16, he inherited part of the land from his Uncle William, who originally purchased the land as part of the South Island Gun Club. Prior to the gun club owning the land, it was the site of multiple plantations.

== Personal life ==
Yawkey married Elise Sparrow in 1925, and the couple adopted a daughter named Julia in July 1936. The couple divorced in November 1944. Yawkey married Jean R. Hiller on Christmas Eve 1944. Tom and Jean Yawkey had no children. Yawkey's only sibling, his sister Emma, died in December 1963.

In 2018, a biography of Yawkey titled Tom Yawkey: Patriarch of the Boston Red Sox by Bill Nowlin was published by the University of Nebraska Press.

== See also ==
- Boston Red Sox Hall of Fame
- The Victory Season, a book about the 1946 baseball season

Sporting positions
Preceded by J. A. Robert Quinn	President of the Boston Red Sox; 1933–1976	Succeeded by Jean R. Yawkey
