= Manuel Linda =

Portuguese priest

- Bishop of Porto
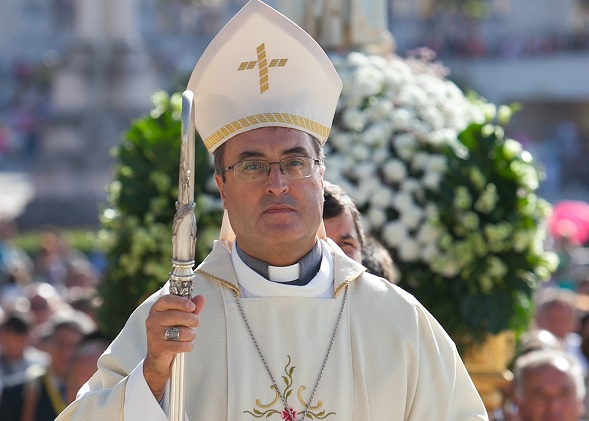
- Linda at the Sanctuary of Fátima in 2014
- Church: Catholic Church
- Province: Braga
- Diocese: Porto
- Appointed: 15 March 2018
- Predecessor: António Francisco dos Santos
- Other posts: Bishop of the Military Ordinariate of Portugal (2013–2018), Auxiliary bishop of Braga (2009–2013)

Orders
- Ordination: 10 June 1981 by António Cardoso Cunha
- Consecration: 20 September 2009 by Joaquim Gonçalves

Personal details
- Born: 15 April 1956 (age 70) Paus (Resende), Portugal
- Education: Catholic University of Portugal, Comillas Pontifical University, Comillas Pontifical University
- Motto: Spe gaudentes (Be joyful in hope)
- Coat of arms

Manuel da Silva Rodrigues Linda (born 15 April 1956) is a Portuguese prelate of the Catholic Church. He was the bishop of the Military Ordinariate of Portugal from 2013 to 2018, when he was named Bishop of Porto.

== Biography ==
Linda was born in the village of Paus (Resende) in the Viseu District. He went to minor seminary in Resende and seminary in Lamego. He was ordained on 10 June 1981 in the Diocese of Vila Real.

Linda graduated in humanities (1987) and theology (1988) from the Catholic University of Portugal, at its respective Braga and Porto campuses. In 1991, he achieved a canonical degree in theology from the Pontifical Lateran University in Rome, followed by a doctorate in theology from the Comillas Pontifical University in Madrid in 1998. He later lectured at the Catholic University of Portugal, the University of Minho and the University of Trás-os-Montes and Alto Douro.

On 27 June 2009, Linda was named by Pope Benedict XVI as auxiliary bishop of the Archdiocese of Braga. He was ordained to the role on 20 September in a service at the Cathedral of Vila Real. Pope Francis named Linda the bishop of the Military Ordinariate of Portugal on 10 October 2013. The previous holder, Januário Torgal Ferreira, had resigned due to old age. In February 2018, Linda was awarded the Medal of the Cross of Saint George by the Armed Forces General Staff.

António Francisco dos Santos, the bishop of Porto, died on 11 September 2017, aged 69. Linda was named his successor on 15 March 2018. He made his solemn entrance on 16 April, his 62nd birthday.

On 5 July 2025, Linda officiated at the Igreja Paroquial in Gondomar, at the funeral of Portugal international footballer Diogo Jota and his younger brother André Silva.

== Views ==
In a December 2018 interview with Público, Linda said that Catholic Church sexual abuse cases were a "fundamentally Anglo-Saxon phenomenon" that occurred mainly in Australia and the United States, and on a lesser scale in Germany. He said that there was a wider social trend towards paedophilia in the 1960s and 1970s and that the reforms from the Second Vatican Council meant that the church no longer had the base to fight it. He said that most paedophiles involved with the abuses had already left the priesthood at the times of their offences.

In October 2022, Linda said that families that keep pets instead of having children are a "disgrace" and a sign of a "decadent society". Inês Sousa Real, leader of the party People Animals Nature, reacted by saying that child abuse was a worse matter, and that Francis of Assisi called for care towards animals.

Magazine Sábado called Linda "the most controversial of all the bishops" in 2022.
