= Arne Slot =

Dutch football manager (born 1978)

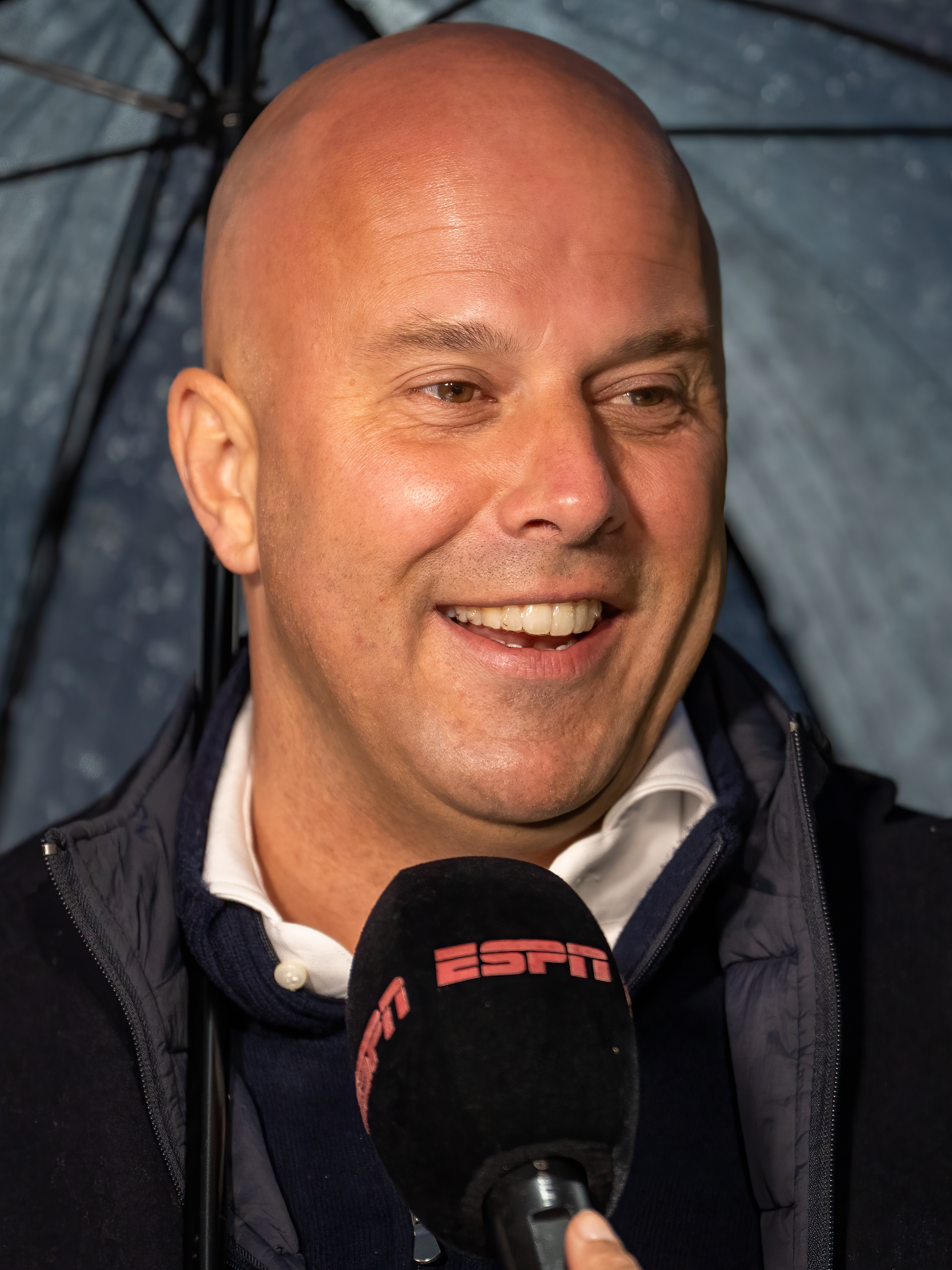
- Slot in 2024

Personal information
- Full name: Arend Martijn Slot
- Date of birth: 17 September 1978 (age 48)
- Place of birth: Bergentheim, Overijssel, Netherlands
- Height: 1.85 m (6 ft 1 in)
- Position: Midfielder

Youth career
- VV Bergentheim
- FC Zwolle

Senior career*
Years	Team	Apps	(Gls)
1995–2002	FC Zwolle	164	(50)
2002–2007	NAC Breda	142	(21)
2007–2010	Sparta Rotterdam	54	(6)
2009–2010	→ FC Zwolle (loan)	28	(7)
2010–2013	PEC Zwolle	74	(16)
Total		462	(100)

International career
1996	Netherlands U19	1	(0)

Managerial career
- 2016–2017: Cambuur
- 2019–2020: AZ
- 2021–2024: Feyenoord
- 2024–2026: Liverpool
- * Club domestic league appearances and goals

Arend Martijn "Arne" Slot (Dutch pronunciation: [ˈaːrənt mɑrˈtɛin ˈɑrnə ˈslɔt]; born 17 September 1978) is a Dutch professional football manager and former player who was most recently the head coach of Premier League club Liverpool.

Slot played as a midfielder for FC Zwolle, where he won the Eerste Divisie in 2002, NAC Breda and Sparta Rotterdam before retiring as a player back at PEC Zwolle, where he won another Eerste Divisie title in 2012.

He started his managerial career in the academy of PEC Zwolle and as an assistant at Cambuur before taking over as co-head coach at the latter. In 2017, he became an assistant at AZ, where he was appointed head coach in 2019. Slot became head coach of Feyenoord in 2021. He led the club to the 2022 UEFA Europa Conference League final in his first season and won the club the Eredivisie and the KNVB Cup in subsequent seasons. He joined Liverpool in 2024, leading the side to a Premier League title in his first season at the club and becoming the first Dutch manager to win the competition, before his dismissal at the end of the following season.

== Early life and playing career ==
Arend Martijn Slot was born on 17 September 1978 in Bergentheim, Overijssel, where he was raised. Slot started his football career at amateur side VV Bergentheim. He then moved to FC Zwolle, where he got into the first team as a 17-year-old in 1995. Slot started his professional career struggling with injuries and little playing time under the management of Jan Everse, but eventually became a goal-scoring attacking midfielder in Zwolle. In 2002, FC Zwolle won the Eerste Divisie to return to the Eredivisie after 13 years. Slot moved to NAC Breda in the same year.

Under the management of Henk ten Cate, NAC Breda finished fourth in the Eredivisie in Slot's first season, NAC Breda's best league finish since 1956. Slot played his only games in European football in the first round of the UEFA Cup in 2003 as NAC Breda lost 5–0 and 0–1 to Newcastle United. He joined Sparta Rotterdam in the summer of 2007 before returning to FC Zwolle in the Eerste Divisie on a loan deal in 2009, before signing a permanent deal in 2010. FC Zwolle won the Eerste Divisie in 2012 to return to the Eredivisie, where Slot played one final season before retiring as a player. According to teammate Edwin de Graaf, he was "not so fast". Everse believes that despite a lack of physicality, Slot got the most out of his playing career due to his passing and vision.

== Coaching career ==
=== Early career ===
According to teammate Bram van Polen, Slot behaved like a coach at PEC Zwolle in his final years as a football player. After retiring from playing in 2013 at PEC Zwolle, Slot moved onto the club's staff, working as a youth coach for a year, before being appointed as an assistant coach of Henk de Jong at Cambuur. After De Jong left the club in 2016, Slot remained an assistant coach at Cambuur under the management of Marcel Keizer and Rob Maas. The club were relegated to the Eerste Divisie after finishing bottom of the Eredivisie in 2016. On 15 October 2016, Slot became interim coach together with Sipke Hulshoff (nl) after Maas was fired. On 5 January 2017, Cambuur announced that Slot and Hulshoff would remain head coaches for the remainder of the season after "excellent results" and a "pleasant way of working".

Slot and Hulshoff helped Cambuur climb from 14th to third place in the league, missing out on promotion to the Eredivisie after losing to MVV in the play-offs. In the KNVB Cup, Cambuur reached the semi-finals for the first time in its club history, having knocked out record winners Ajax. The club missed out on the final after losing to AZ on penalties.

=== AZ Alkmaar ===
In 2017, Slot left Cambuur to join AZ, working as an assistant to John van den Brom. AZ's technical director Max Huiberts called Slot "experienced, studious, innovative and ambitious". AZ finished third and fourth in the Eredivisie in 2018 and 2019 and lost the 2018 KNVB Cup final to Feyenoord. On 10 December 2018, it was announced that Slot would succeed Van den Brom as head coach for the 2019–20 season.

Slot became the first coach to win 19 points in his first eight Eredivisie games at AZ. In his first season in charge, AZ reached the round of 32 of the UEFA Europa League. The same season, the Eredivisie was cancelled midway due to the COVID-19 pandemic. AZ finished second behind Ajax on goal difference, although no title was awarded for the season. The following season, AZ got knocked out by Dynamo Kyiv in the UEFA Champions League third qualifying round. In the UEFA Europa League group stage, AZ beat Napoli 0–1, which Slot called "a historic win for AZ standards". On 5 December 2020, Slot was sacked as head coach of AZ for not being focused on the team, having recently negotiated a deal with Feyenoord. At the time, AZ was in seventh place in the Eredivisie. In his time at AZ, Slot earned 2.11 points per game in the Eredivisie, the highest of any coach in the club's history.

=== Feyenoord ===
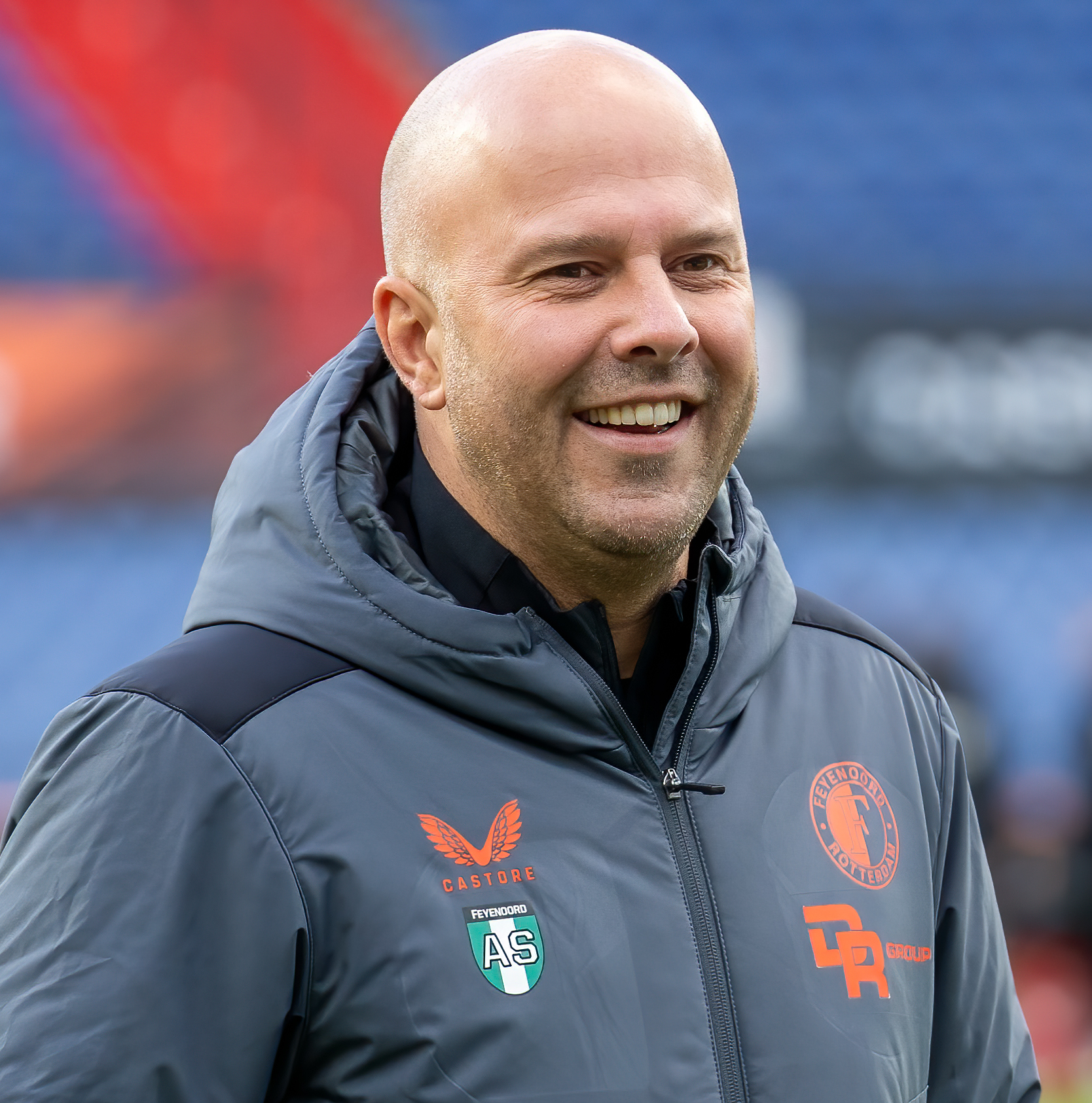
Slot managing Feyenoord in 2023

On 15 December 2020, Feyenoord announced that the club had reached a deal with Slot for him to become the club's new coach from the start of the 2021–22 season. The deal saw Slot sign for two years, with Feyenoord having the option to extend his contract for a third year. Slot succeeded the experienced Dick Advocaat, who led the team to fifth place in the Eredivisie and qualification to the UEFA Europa Conference League Qualifiers. Slot was appointed to build a new team with a recognisable playing style. Marino Pušić (first assistant coach) and Robin van Persie (field coach) were added to his staff, while John de Wolf was retained as second assistant coach.

During Slot's first season, Feyenoord reached the round of 16 in European football for the first time in twenty years, finishing ahead of Slavia Prague, Union Berlin and Maccabi Haifa in the UEFA Europa Conference League group stage. On 25 February 2022, Feyenoord used the club option to extend Slot's contract until 2024. In the knock-out stage of the Europa Conference League, the club knocked out Partizan, Slavia Prague and Marseille to reach the inaugural Europa Conference League final. Feyenoord lost the final 1–0 to Roma in Tirana and finished in third place in the Eredivisie. Slot was awarded the Rinus Michels Award for the Eredivisie Manager of the Year.

Ahead of the 2022–23 season on 24 July 2022, Slot extended his contract at Feyenoord for a year, until 2025. Feyenoord won a UEFA Europa League group of Midtjylland, Lazio and Sturm Graz to reach the round of 16 of Europe's secondary club football tournament for a first time since 2002. In the round of 16, Feyenoord beat Shakhtar Donetsk 7–1 on 17 March 2023, Feyenoord's biggest win in European football since 1995. With the win, Slot overtook Ernst Happel and Bert van Marwijk to become the first Feyenoord manager to have won 15 matches in European football. Feyenoord were eventually knocked out in the quarter-finals of the UEFA Europa League by Roma and in the semi-finals of the KNVB Cup by Ajax. On 14 May 2023, Feyenoord beat Go Ahead Eagles 3–0 to win the Eredivisie, the club's first league title since 2017 and sixteenth in the club's history. In the following weeks, Slot was heavily linked with the vacant manager's job at Tottenham Hotspur. By the end of the month, Slot announced he would be remaining with Feyenoord and extended his contract with a year, to mid-2026. Slot was awarded the Rinus Michels Award for Eredivisie Manager of the Year in June 2023, becoming the fourth coach to win the award for consecutive editions.

In the 2023–24 season, Feyenoord were knocked out of the UEFA Champions League group stage, finishing third in a group with Atlético Madrid, Lazio, and Celtic, and then knocked out by Roma for a third consecutive season, losing on penalties in the UEFA Europa League knock-out round play-offs. By managing the second leg against Roma, Slot equalled a club record of Van Marwijk of managing 36 European games. On 21 April 2024, Feyenoord beat NEC in the final to win their 14th KNVB Cup. Many pundits have described Arne Slot as one of the best coaches in the history of Feyenoord, as he combined results with developing players and playing attacking, attractive football. His final game on 19 May was a 4–0 home win over city rivals Excelsior Rotterdam, to finish as runners-up to PSV Eindhoven.

=== Liverpool ===
==== 2024–25: Inaugural season and Premier League title ====
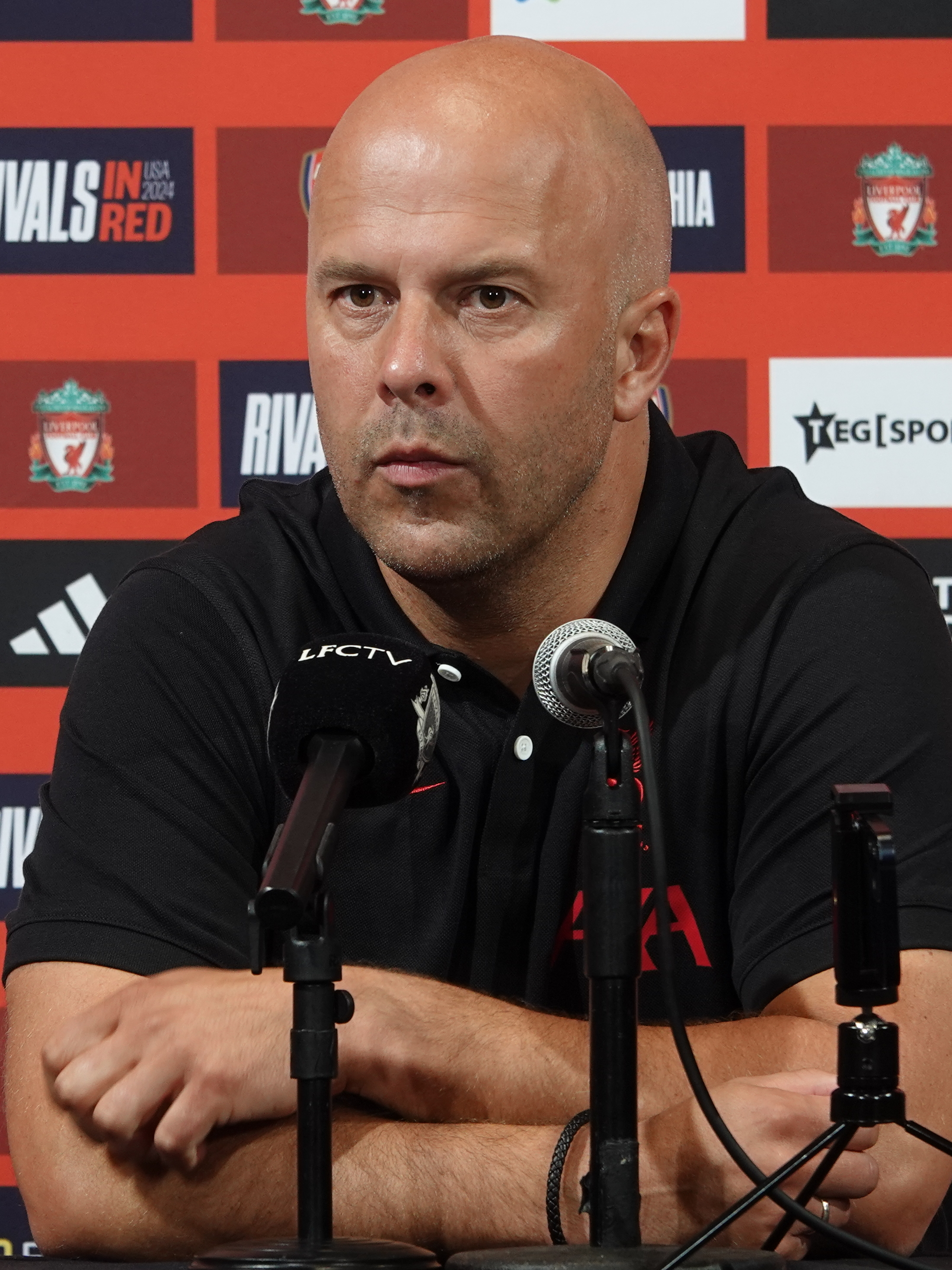
Slot as Liverpool manager in 2024

On 26 April 2024, it was reported that Premier League club Liverpool had reached an agreement with Feyenoord for Slot to manage the club at the end of the season, replacing the departing Jürgen Klopp. Slot confirmed this news on 17 May. Three days later, Liverpool announced that Slot would become head coach on 1 June 2024, subject to a work permit. On 17 August, he won his first Premier League match with the club after a 2–0 away win at Ipswich Town. He was the first Liverpool manager since Gérard Houllier in 1998 to win his first game in charge. Liverpool defeated club rivals Manchester United 3–0 on his first visit to Old Trafford in his third game as manager on 1 September, becoming only the second Liverpool manager to win in his first match at Old Trafford, after George Kay in 1936.

Slot's only competitive loss of 2024 came on 14 September, when Nottingham Forest beat Liverpool 1–0 at Anfield. This also ended up becoming the only Premier League game that season in which Liverpool did not score. Shortly after, Slot became the first Premier League manager to win his first 6 away games, the quickest Premier League manager to reach 15 wins in all competitions and the first Liverpool manager to win the first 11 out of 12 matches at the start of a season.

On 27 November, Liverpool beat Real Madrid during their UEFA Champions League matchup with a 2–0 scoreline, ending Liverpool's 15-year winless run against the defending European champions. Following Liverpool's strong start to the season, Slot won Premier League Manager of the Month for November 2024. Slot's Liverpool went into 2025 9 points clear at the top of the Premier League (since matchday 6) and also on top of the UEFA Champions League (since matchday 4). They qualified for the UEFA Champions League Round of 16 after finishing top of the league. He reached his first final with Liverpool, the 2025 EFL Cup final after defeating Tottenham Hotspur 4–1 on aggregate in the semi-finals. In the final, Liverpool lost 2–1 to Newcastle United.

On 27 April 2025, Liverpool defeated Tottenham Hotspur 5–1 to clinch the club's first Premier League title since 2019–20. Slot became the seventh manager in Premier League history to win a league title in their first season, and the first since Antonio Conte with Chelsea in 2016–17. He also became the first Dutch manager to win the Premier League.

==== 2025–26: Second season and dismissal ====
Prior to the beginning of the 2025–26 season on 3 July 2025, forward Diogo Jota died in a car accident along with his brother André Silva in Cernadilla, northern Spain. Slot said: "For us as a club, the sense of shock is absolute. Diogo was not just our player. He was a loved one to all of us. He was a teammate, a colleague, a workmate and in all of those roles he was very special." Slot attended Jota's funeral in Porto on 5 July 2025, alongside several other Liverpool players and staff. Liverpool began the season by losing the FA Community Shield on penalties to Crystal Palace despite leading twice in the match.

Liverpool began their Premier League title defence with a 4–2 win over Bournemouth. After further wins against Newcastle United and Arsenal, Slot was awarded with the Manager of the Month award for August. After a 2–1 victory over Everton in the Merseyside derby, their fifth consecutive win of the season, Liverpool experienced a significant downturn in form, that continued for the rest of the season. A run of six defeats from seven Premier League matches saw Liverpool fall to 12th place by late November. In April 2026, Slot's side were knocked out of both the FA Cup and UEFA Champions League in the space of 10 days with heavy defeats to Manchester City and Paris Saint-Germain respectively. Liverpool finished the 2025–26 season in fifth place.

On 30 May 2026, Slot was dismissed by Liverpool as head coach after his second season in the role. This came after his side suffered 20 defeats across all competitions, their most since 1992–93. Five days later, on 4 June 2026, Andoni Iraola was named as his successor.

== Personal life ==
Slot and his wife Mirjam have two children. Mirjam remained in the Netherlands with the two children when Slot joined Liverpool in order to prioritize their education with both sitting exams in 2025.

== Managerial statistics ==
As of 30 May 2026

Managerial record by team and tenure
Team	From	To	Record					Ref.
Team	From	To	P	W	D	L	Win %	Ref.
Cambuur	15 October 2016	30 June 2017	34	21	6	7	61.8	
AZ	1 July 2019	5 December 2020	58	32	16	10	55.2	
Feyenoord	1 July 2021	31 May 2024	150	98	29	23	65.3	
Liverpool	1 June 2024	30 May 2026	113	66	19	28	58.4	
Career total			355	217	70	68	61.1	

== Honours ==
=== Player ===
Zwolle

- Eerste Divisie: 2001–02, 2011–12

=== Manager ===
Feyenoord

- Eredivisie: 2022–23
- KNVB Cup: 2023–24
- UEFA Conference League runner-up: 2021–22

Liverpool

- Premier League: 2024–25
- EFL Cup runner-up: 2024–25

Individual

- Rinus Michels Award: 2021–22, 2022–23
- LMA Manager of the Year: 2024–25
- Premier League Manager of the Season: 2024–25
- Premier League Manager of the Month: November 2024, August 2025
