= Rui Valério =

Portuguese Catholic Patriarch

His Most Reverend Excellency Dom Rui I SMM
- Patriarch of Lisbon
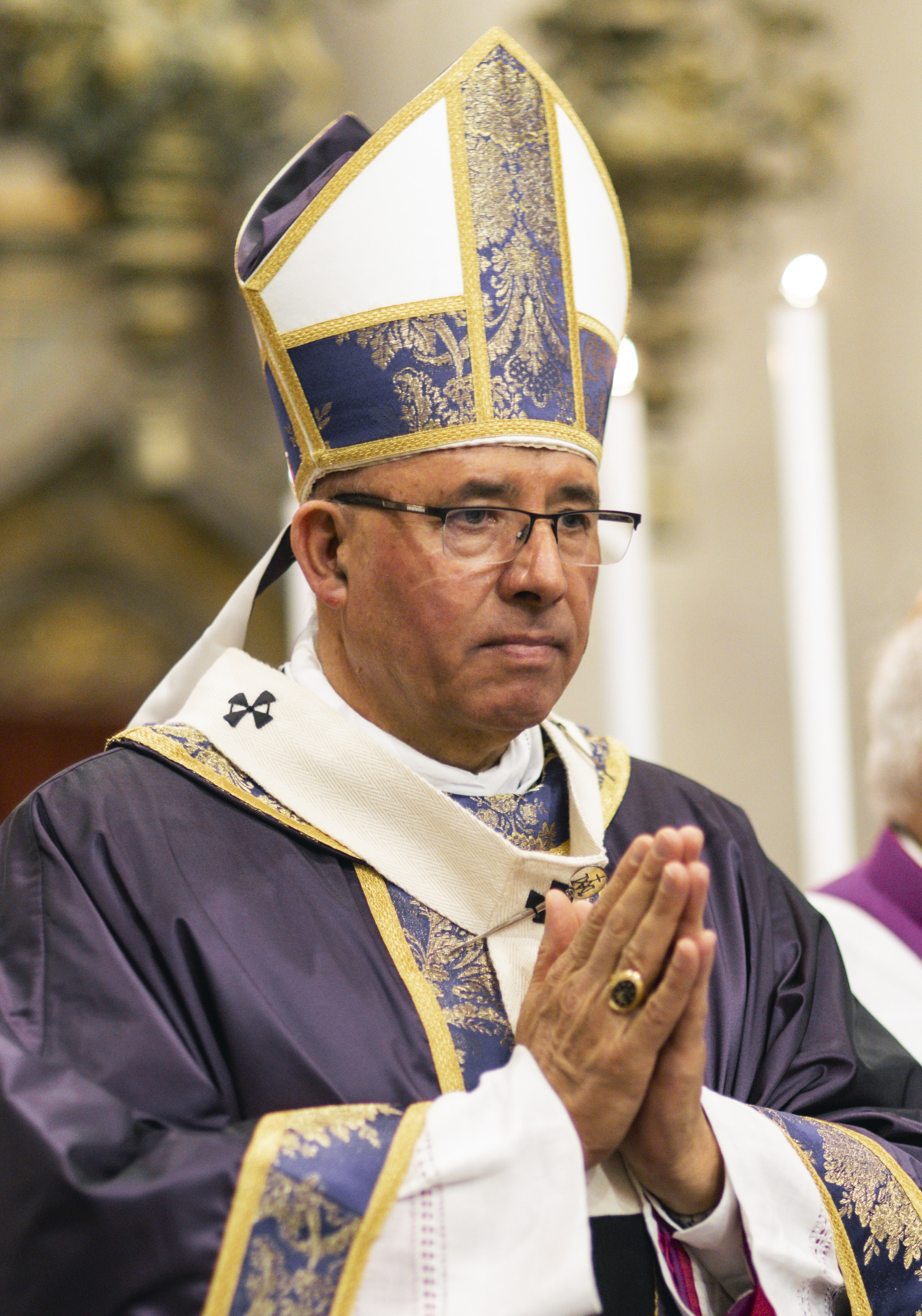
- Rui in 2025
- Church: Catholic Church
- Archdiocese: Lisbon
- Metropolis: Lisbon
- See: Lisbon
- Appointed: 10 August 2023
- Installed: 2 September 2023
- Predecessor: Manuel III
- Previous post: Military Ordinary of Portugal (2018–23)

Orders
- Ordination: 23 March 1991 by Alberto Cosme do Amaral
- Consecration: 25 November 2018 by Manuel Clemente

Personal details
- Born: Rui Manuel Sousa Valério; 24 December 1964 (age 61) Urqueira, Ourém, Portugal
- Education: Pontifical Lateran University; Pontifical Gregorian University
- Motto: In manibus Tuis ("Into Your hands")
- Coat of arms

Rui Manuel Sousa Valério, SMM (born 24 December 1964), officially Dom Rui I, is a Portuguese prelate of the Catholic Church and a member of the Missionaries of the Company of Mary (Monfortans) who has been the Patriarch of Lisbon since September 2023. He has been a bishop since 2018 and headed the Military Ordinariate of Portugal from 2018 to 2023.

== Biography ==
Rui Manuel Sousa Valério was born on 24 December 1964 in Urqueira, Ourem, Portugal. He first learned of Our Lady of Fátima from his grandmother, who was one of the witnesses of the Miracle of the Sun of 13 October 1917. He entered the Monfortan Seminary in Fatima at the age of 11, became a novice in 1984 in Santeramo in Colle, Bari, Italy, and took his first vows on 6 September 1985. He studied at the Pontifical Lateran University and earned a licentiate in theology with a specialty in dogmatic theology from the Pontifical Gregorian University in 1992. He took his vows as a Monfortan on 6 October 1990 and was ordained a priest for that order on 23 March 1991 in the Cova da Iria neighborhood of Fátima by Bishop Alberto Cosme do Amaral.

He continued his studies while a priest, participating in a study on the writings of Saint Louis Marie Grignon de Monfort and on Morfortian spirituality in 1995–96 at the Monfort International Center in Leuven, Belgium. He also undertook doctoral studies in theology at the Catholic University of Portugal in 1997.

He served at the parish of Castelverde di Lunghezza in Rome in 1991–92; military chaplain at the Navy Hospital in Lisbon in 1992–93; parish vicar in Castro Verde in the Diocese of Beja from 1993 to 1995; parish vicar in Póvoa de Santo Adrião in Lisbon; and chaplain at the Naval School in Alfeite from 2008 to 2011; and vicar of the deanery of Loures-Odivelas in Lisbon in 2014.

Within his order he was formator of postulants from 2007 to 2011, counsellor to the Major Superior for the Delegation, and local superior.

On 27 October 2018, Pope Francis appointed him the ordinary of the Military Ordinariate of Portugal. He received his episcopal consecration on the following 25 November, and he was installed on 11 December at the Igreja da Memória, the Cathedral of the Diocese of the Armed and Security Forces. He was the first Portuguese Monfortan to become a bishop.

On 10 August 2023, Pope Francis appointed him the Patriarch of Lisbon. He was installed on 2 September.

Catholic Church titles
Preceded by Manuel Clemente	Patriarch of Lisbon; 2 September 2023 – present	Incumbent
Preceded by Manuel Linda	Military Ordinary of Portugal; 11 December 2018 – 10 August 2023	Succeeded by Sérgio Dinis
