= Military Ordinariate of Portugal =

Roman Catholic ecclesiastical jurisdiction in Portugal

Military Ordinariate of Portugal Ordinariato Castrense de Portugal

Catholic
- Igreja da Memória, in Lisbon, the cathedral of the Military Ordinariate

Location
- Country: Portugal

Information
- Denomination: Roman Catholic
- Rite: Latin Rite
- Established: 29 May 1966 (60 years ago)

Current leadership
- Pope: Leo XIV
- Bishop: Sérgio Manuel Ribeiro Dinis
- Bishops emeritus: Januário Torgal Mendes Ferreira

Website
- www.ecclesia.pt

The Military Ordinariate of Portugal (Portuguese: Ordinariato Castrense de Portugal) is a military ordinariate of the Roman Catholic Church. Immediately subject to the Holy See, it provides pastoral care to Roman Catholics serving in the Portuguese Armed Forces and their families.

== History ==
It was established as a military vicariate 29 May 1966, and was elevated to a military ordinariate on 21 July 1986.

== Office holders ==
=== Military vicars ===
- Manuel Gonçalves Cerejeira (29 May 1966 – 24 January 1972), retired
- António Ribeiro (24 January 1972 – became Military Ordinary 21 July 1986)

=== Military ordinaries ===
- António Ribeiro (21 July 1986 – 24 March 1998)
- Januário Torgal Mendes Ferreira (3 May 2001 – 10 October 2013), retired
- Manuel da Silva Rodrigues Linda (10 October 2013 – 15 March 2018), appointed Bishop of Porto
- Rui Manuel Sousa Valério, S.M.M. (27 October 2018 – 10 August 2023), appointed Patriarch of Lisbon
- Sérgio Manuel Ribeiro Dinis (22 November 2024 – Present)
