= Diogo Jota =

Portuguese footballer (1996–2025)

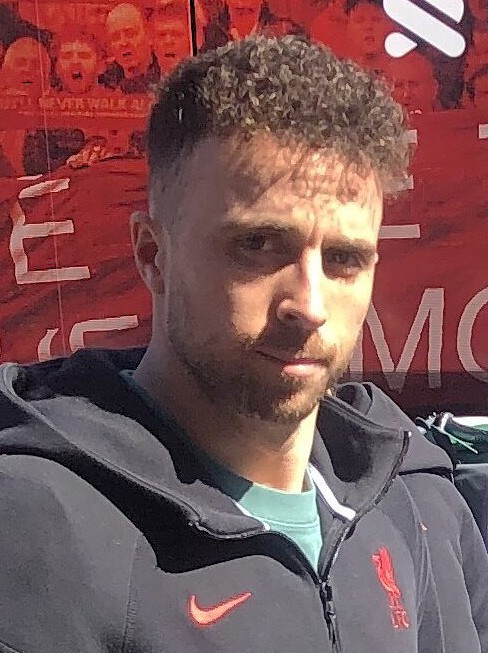
- Jota in 2025

Personal information
- Full name: Diogo José Teixeira da Silva
- Date of birth: 4 December 1996
- Place of birth: Porto, Portugal
- Date of death: 3 July 2025 (aged 28)
- Place of death: Cernadilla, Zamora, Spain
- Height: 1.78 m (5 ft 10 in)
- Positions: Forward; winger

Youth career
- 2005–2013: Gondomar
- 2013–2015: Paços de Ferreira

Senior career*
Years	Team	Apps	(Gls)
2014–2016	Paços de Ferreira	41	(14)
2016–2018	Atlético Madrid	0	(0)
2016–2017	→ Porto (loan)	27	(8)
2017–2018	→ Wolverhampton Wanderers (loan)	44	(17)
2018–2020	Wolverhampton Wanderers	67	(16)
2020–2025	Liverpool	123	(47)
Total		302	(102)

International career
2014–2015	Portugal U19	9	(5)
2015–2018	Portugal U21	20	(8)
2016	Portugal U23	1	(1)
2019–2025	Portugal	49	(14)
Medal record
Men's football
Representing Portugal
UEFA Nations League
Winner	2019 Portugal
Winner	2025 Germany
- * Club domestic league appearances and goals

Diogo José Teixeira da Silva (Note: European Portuguese pronunciation: [ˈdjoɣu ʒuˈzɛ tɐjˈʃɐjɾɐ ðɐ ˈsilvɐ]) (4 December 1996 – 3 July 2025), commonly known as Diogo Jota, (Note: European Portuguese pronunciation: [ˈdjo.ɣu ˈʒɔ.tɐ]; Jota is a nickname; Diogo Jota means "Diogo J." in Portuguese, the shortening of Diogo José.) was a Portuguese professional footballer who played as a forward and winger. He was known for his finishing, pace, dribbling ability, and work rate.

Jota started his career with Paços de Ferreira, before signing for La Liga club Atlético Madrid in 2016. After two seasons in the Primeira Liga, he was consecutively loaned to Primeira Liga club Porto in 2016 and EFL Championship club Wolverhampton Wanderers in 2017. Having helped them gain promotion to the Premier League, he joined the club in 2018 for a reported €14 million and made 131 appearances for them, scoring 44 goals. In 2020, he signed for Liverpool for a fee reported to be £41 million. He played 182 games and scored 65 goals over five seasons for Liverpool, winning the Premier League in 2025, as well as one FA Cup and two EFL Cup titles.

As a Portugal youth international, Jota represented his country at under-19, under-21, and under-23 levels. He made his senior international debut in November 2019 and was chosen in the squads for two UEFA European Championships (2020 and 2024), but missed the 2022 FIFA World Cup due to injury. He also won the UEFA Nations League in 2019 and 2025.

On 3 July 2025, Jota and his brother André Silva died in a car accident in Cernadilla, Spain. The death was followed by Liverpool retiring his number 20.

== Club career ==
=== Paços de Ferreira ===
Jota was born on 4 December 1996 in the parish of Massarelos, Porto, Portugal, and grew up in Gondomar, also in the Porto metropolitan area. He played for local club Gondomar S.C. between the ages of 9 and 17, and in 2022, the academy was named after him.

Having been rejected by larger clubs due to his small frame, Jota signed for Paços de Ferreira's youth setup in 2013. He was promoted to the main squad at the start of the 2014–15 season, and made his senior debut on 19 October 2014 by starting in a 4–0 home win against Atlético de Reguengos for the Taça de Portugal. During the season, he had a one-month absence from training after he was diagnosed with a heart condition.

Jota first appeared in the Primeira Liga on 20 February 2015, coming on as a late substitute for Diogo Rosado in a 2–2 home draw against Vitória de Guimarães. He scored his first goals in the competition on 17 May, netting a brace in a 3–2 home success over Académica de Coimbra and becoming the youngest player ever to score for the club in the top tier in the process.

On 30 May 2015, Jota signed a new five-year deal with Paços, keeping him tied up until 2020. In the first game of the campaign, a 1–0 win over Académica at the Estádio da Mata Real on 17 August, he was sent off at the end for pushing Hugo Seco; Ricardo Nascimento was also sent off for retaliating on his teammate's behalf. During the season, manager Jorge Simão said that Jota would be the successor to Cristiano Ronaldo, a comparison that stunned the young player.

Uniquely for a first-team player, Jota lived in a club dormitory while at Paços de Ferreira. This living arrangement was to avoid distractions while learning foreign languages, in preparation for a possible move abroad.

=== Atlético Madrid and Porto loan ===
On 14 March 2016, Jota agreed to a five-year contract with Atlético Madrid effective as of 1 July. On 26 August, however, he was quickly loaned out back to Portugal to play for Porto. On 1 October, Jota scored a first-half hat-trick in a 4–0 away victory against Nacional. He also took part in the 2016–17 UEFA Champions League, scoring his first goal in the competition on 7 December in a 5–0 home victory against Leicester City.

=== Wolverhampton Wanderers ===
==== 2017–19: Premier League promotion and Europa League finish ====
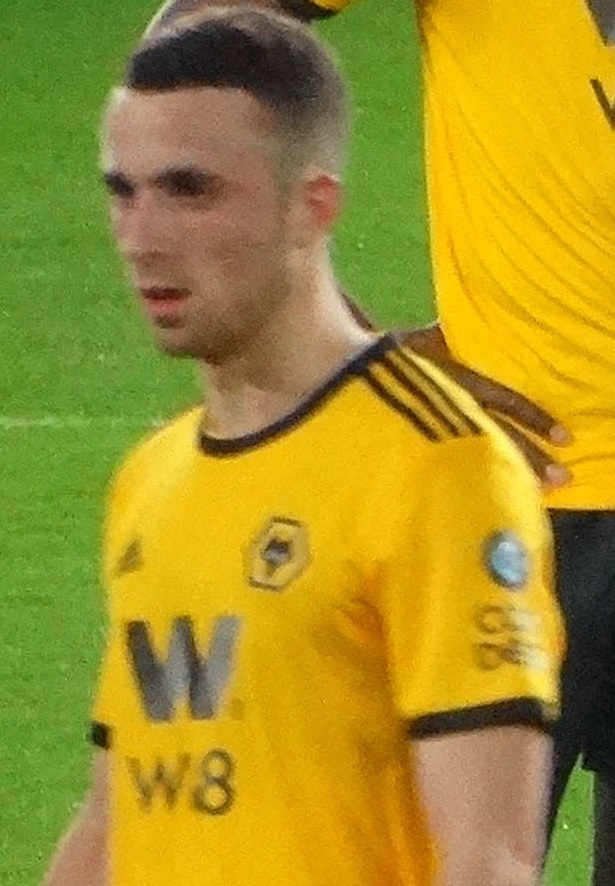
Jota playing for Wolverhampton Wanderers in 2018

On 25 July 2017, Jota signed for EFL Championship club Wolverhampton Wanderers on a season-long loan. He scored his first goal on 15 August, in a 3–2 away win over Hull City. On 30 January 2018, it was announced that a permanent deal with Jota had been agreed for a reported €14 million, being made effective on 1 July. He scored a career-best 17 league goals in his first year, ranking fifth in the league top scorer charts, as Wolves achieved promotion to the Premier League as champions; due to English Football League regulations, he wore his legal surname on his jersey in the Championship but was able to change it to "Diogo J" after the feat.

Jota made his debut in the Premier League on 11 August 2018, playing the full 90 minutes in a 2–2 home draw against Everton. He scored his first goal in the competition on 5 December, helping the hosts come from behind to beat Chelsea 2–1. His second came four days later, in a win at Newcastle United by the same scoreline. On 19 January 2019, Jota scored three times in the 4–3 home victory over Leicester City – his second career hat-trick. In the process, he became only the second Portuguese player to achieve the feat in the Premier League after Cristiano Ronaldo 11 years earlier. This was a first-ever for the club in the competition and a first for the club in the top flight of English football since John Richards, against the same opposition, in the Football League First Division in October 1977. On 16 March 2019, Jota scored the winning goal in a 2–1 win against Manchester United in the 2018–19 FA Cup, to help Wolves reach their first semi-final in the competition since 1997–98.

==== 2019–20: Final season with Wolves ====
On 25 July 2019, Jota scored in a 2–0 win over Northern Irish club Crusaders in the Europa League second qualifying round, Wolves' first European goal since October 1980, and in the next round on 15 August, he scored an overhead kick to conclude a 4–0 (8–0 aggregate) victory over Pyunik.

In the final Europa League group stage game at home to Beşiktaş on 12 December 2019, Jota replaced compatriot Rúben Neves as a 56th-minute substitute with the game goalless, scored after 72 seconds and completed a hat-trick within twelve minutes as Wolves ran out 4–0 victors. The following 20 February, he netted another treble in a win by the same score over Espanyol in the first leg of the last 32 of the tournament. His 131st and last appearance for Wolves was as a second-half substitute in their Europa League quarter-final against Sevilla on 11 August 2020; his 44th and final goal for the club in a 3–0 league victory over Everton on 12 July.

=== Liverpool ===
==== 2020–21: Debut season and adaptation ====
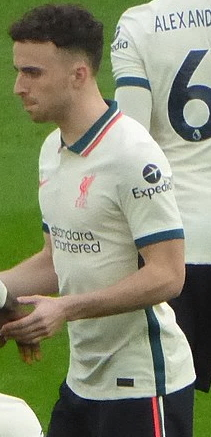
Jota playing for Liverpool in 2021

On 19 September 2020, Jota joined Liverpool on a long-term deal, reportedly for a £41 million transfer fee, rising to £45 million with potential add-ons. The club had become intrigued by Jota during his time at Porto, with an official report prepared on the player's display throughout the 2018–19 season, though the decision was made to continue monitoring at the time due to the recent nature of the player's permanent move to Wolves. Manager Jürgen Klopp made the final decision to sign Jota when, in early 2020, he was given an account of Jota's traits and abilities over the course of 15 games, and ultimately selected him from a list including three other attackers to join the club.

He made his debut in the EFL Cup five days later, coming on as a second-half substitute against Lincoln City in a 7–2 win. On 28 September, he scored on his Premier League debut for the club, with the third in a 3–1 win against Arsenal at Anfield. Jota scored the club's 10,000th goal in their history when he netted the opener against Midtjylland in the UEFA Champions League group stage, and scored a hat-trick on 3 November in a 5–0 win at Atalanta in the same competition. In doing so, he became the first player since Robbie Fowler in 1993 to score 7 goals in his first 10 Liverpool appearances. On 22 November, Jota scored the second goal in a 3–0 victory against Leicester City, becoming the first Liverpool player to score in each of his first four home matches in the Premier League. For his performances in October, Jota was awarded Liverpool Player of the Month by the club's supporters. On 9 December, Jota suffered a leg injury during a UEFA Champions League match against Midtjylland, in a dead rubber match, sidelining him for three months.

Jota ended his debut season at the club with nine league goals, including a back heel in a 4–2 away win against Manchester United, which helped Liverpool finish third in the Premier League and qualify for the Champions League.

==== 2021–22: Domestic double and European final ====
On 14 August 2021, Jota scored Liverpool's first goal of the 2021–22 Premier League season in a 3–0 away victory against newly promoted Norwich City. On 24 October, he scored in a 5–0 away victory against Liverpool's arch rivals Manchester United at Old Trafford. On 3 November, he opened the scoring in a 2–0 home victory in the Champions League against his former club Atlético Madrid to ensure Liverpool's qualification to the round of 16, as group winners. On 1 December, he scored Liverpool's fourth goal in a 4–1 away win against local rivals Everton in the Merseyside derby, as the club became the first team in English top-flight history to score at least two goals in eighteen successive games in all competitions. For his performances in November, he was awarded PFA Fans' Player of the Month. On 16 December, Jota scored Liverpool's first goal in a 3–1 home win against Newcastle United, in what was Liverpool's 2,000th top-flight win.

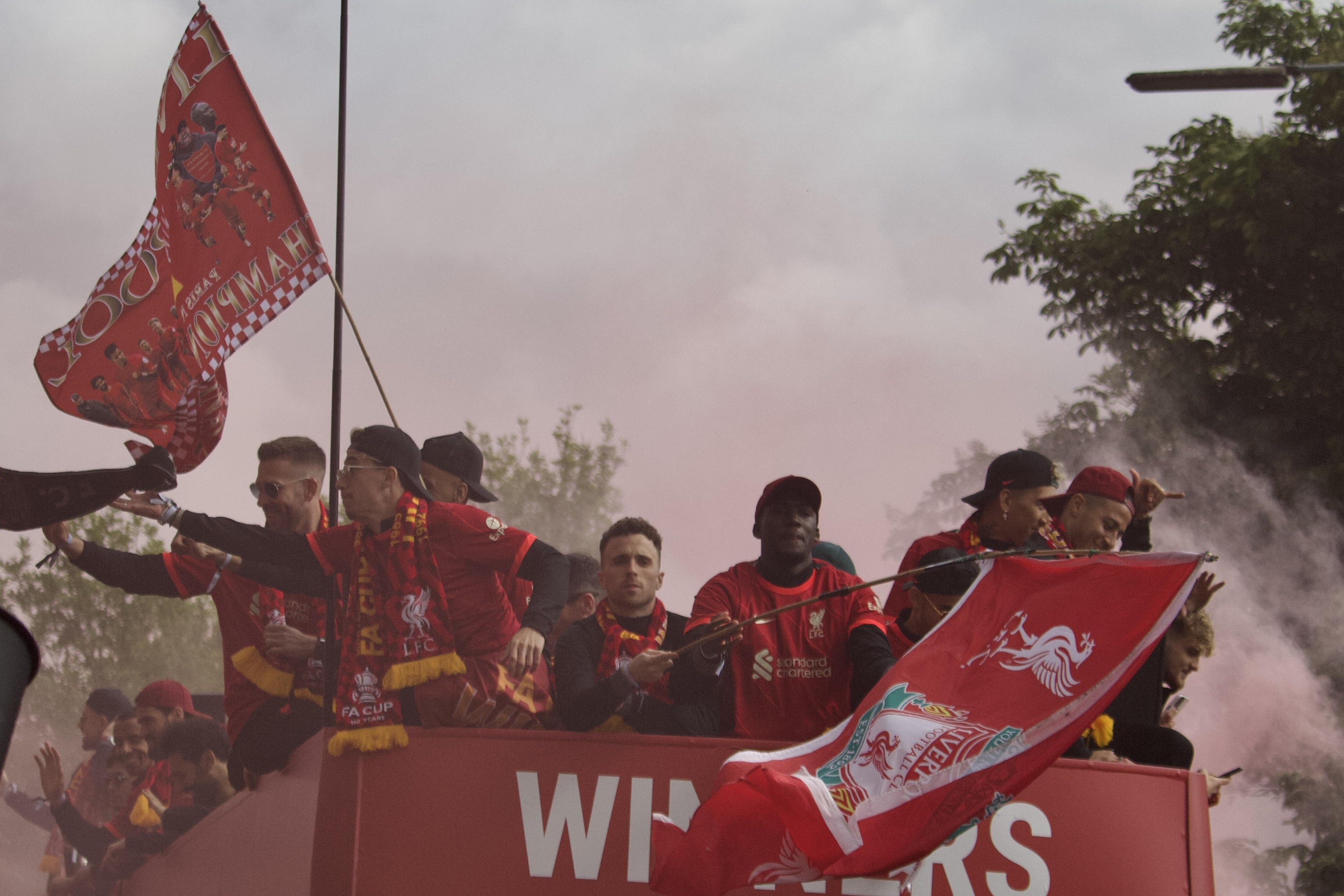
Jota at the EFL and FA Cup trophies parade on the streets of Liverpool on 29 May 2022, the day after the end of the 2021–22 season

In EFL Cup semi-finals, Jota scored both goals in a 2–0 away win over Arsenal to send Liverpool into the final. On 27 February, following a goalless draw against Chelsea after extra time, he scored his penalty during the shoot-out to help Liverpool win their first League Cup since 2012. On 14 May, in the 2022 FA Cup final, Jota came on as a substitute for the injured Mohamed Salah after 33 minutes. Liverpool won the final after a penalty shoot-out, in which Jota scored his penalty. On 28 May, Jota made a substitute appearance in the 65th minute of the 2022 UEFA Champions League Final, as Liverpool lost to 1–0 Real Madrid.

==== 2022–23: Contract extension and recurring injuries ====
Jota suffered a hamstring injury in the pre-season which made him miss the start of the season. On 2 August 2022, Jota signed a new long-term deal with the club. He made his return from injury on 3 September, replacing Darwin Núñez in the 80th minute of a 0–0 draw against rivals Everton in the Merseyside derby. On 12 October, Jota came off the bench in a Champions League match away to Rangers, before providing three assists in one match for the first time in his career to Mohamed Salah, who completed a hat-trick in the space of six minutes and twelve seconds of an eventual 7–1 win. On 16 October, he suffered a calf injury during Liverpool's 1–0 home win over Manchester City, which ruled him out for the 2022 FIFA World Cup. He returned from injury on 13 February, replacing Darwin Núñez in the 70th minute in a 2–0 victory against Everton.

Having not registered a goal since 10 April 2022, Jota returned to scoring ways on 17 April 2023, with two goals in Liverpool's 6–1 away win over Leeds United. On 30 April, with Liverpool conceding a last minute equalizer, having led the match by three goals, Jota scored the dramatic late winner in added time in Liverpool's 4–3 home win over Tottenham Hotspur, leading him to be nominated for the Premier League Player of the Month award. After the season, Liverpool narrowly missed out on Champions League qualification.

==== 2023–24: League Cup victory ====
Following an injury-riddled season, Jota started the new season on 19 August, by closing Liverpool's 3–1 win against Bournemouth. On 30 September, Jota was sent off just 24 minutes after coming on against Tottenham, leaving his team with 9 men. He would receive criticism from pundits; Stephen Warnock claimed that he had "been poor since coming on at half time, not up to the pace of the game at all", while Gary Neville agreed with the red card, as he believed Jota's actions were a "stupidity". On 5 October, he scored his first goal in the 2023–24 UEFA Europa League, closing the 2–0 win against Union Saint-Gilloise in a group stage match.

In January 2024, with Mohamed Salah unavailable due to playing in the 2023 Africa Cup of Nations and his subsequent injury, Jota stepped up in his absence, forming a successful partnership with Darwin Núñez that saw him score five goals and assist another two in Liverpool's wins over Burnley, Newcastle United, Bournemouth and Chelsea, earning him the Premier League Player of the Month award for January. On 17 February, he suffered a knee injury during Liverpool's 4–1 away win over Brentford, sidelining him for two months. He made his return from injury in a 3–0 home loss to Atalanta in the first leg of the Europa League on 11 April. Shortly after, Jota suffered another injury setback against Fulham on 21 April, leading him to miss Liverpool's remaining matches of the 2023–24 season.

==== 2024–25: Premier League title ====
On 17 August, Jota scored Liverpool's first goal under new head coach Arne Slot in a 2–0 away win against Ipswich Town. Over the following matches, Jota started as the club's number 9, due to fitting better into Slot's system tactically, as he could drop deep and act similar to a false nine, leading him to compete with Darwin Núñez for a starting spot. On 5 October, Jota made his 100th start for the club, scoring the only goal of an away win over Crystal Palace. On 2 April 2025, Jota scored the winner, and his last ever goal, against Everton in the Merseyside derby at Anfield to maintain the club's 12-point lead at the top of the table. On 27 April, Liverpool won the 2024–25 Premier League, earning Jota's fourth and final trophy with the club.

== International career ==
=== Youth ===
Jota started playing for Portugal at under-19 level, scoring his first goal on 29 May 2015 in a 6–1 home win over Turkey in 2015 UEFA European Under-19 Championship qualification. He won his first cap for the under-21 team on 17 November of the same year at not yet 19, playing 15 minutes in the 3–0 away defeat of Israel in another qualifier. On 25 May 2018, he netted a brace for the under-21s in their 3–2 friendly win over Italy held in Estoril.

=== Senior ===
In March 2019, Jota was called up to the senior side for the first time, ahead of the opening UEFA Euro 2020 qualifying matches against Ukraine and Serbia. Still uncapped, he was part of the squad that won the 2019 UEFA Nations League Finals on home soil in June but did not make an appearance. On 14 November, he made his debut by coming on as an 84th-minute substitute for Cristiano Ronaldo in a 6–0 win against Lithuania in a UEFA Euro 2020 qualifier. He scored his first international goal on 5 September 2020 in a 4–1 home win over Croatia in the UEFA Nations League.

Jota was named in Portugal's final squad for the delayed UEFA Euro 2020 tournament, scoring in a 4–2 group stage defeat to Germany. He played all games in a round of 16-exit defeat to Belgium. On 18 October 2022, Jota was ruled out of the 2022 FIFA World Cup due to a calf injury he sustained during a league match with Liverpool against Manchester City on 16 October 2022.

On 11 September 2023, Jota scored a brace in Portugal's 9–0 home victory over Luxembourg in the UEFA Euro 2024 qualifiers, their biggest win in international history. On 21 May 2024, he was named in Portugal's squad for final tournament in Germany, where he made three appearances against Czech Republic and Georgia in the group phase and Slovenia (3–0 victory in a penalty shootout) in the knockout stage, before Portugal was eliminated from the tournament by France in the quarter-finals after losing 5–3 in another penalty shootout.

In May 2025, Jota was selected for Portugal's 2025 UEFA Nations League Finals squad. He and his team went on to win the tournament 5–3 in a penalty shoot-out over rivals Spain, which would be Jota's final match and trophy in his football career.

== Style of play ==
Jota was a versatile forward, capable of playing in several attacking positions; he was deployed as a centre forward, as an out-and-out striker, as a winger, as a false 9, or as an inside forward. Though ostensibly right-footed, he was very strong with both feet. Jota was also known for his clinical finishing, explosive pace, dribbling ability, positional sense, movement and close control which made him especially effective on the counter-attack. Moreover, he was also known for his defensive contribution and high work rate on the pitch.

== Personal life ==
Jota, whose actual surname was Silva, chose to use the name "Jota" to distinguish himself from other players named Diogo and Silva in the youth academy. "Jota" is the Portuguese pronunciation of the letter "J", making this equivalent to calling himself "Diogo J".

Jota's brother, André Silva, was also a professional footballer. Like his brother, André started playing football at Gondomar and played for Paços de Ferreira at youth level. When Jota joined Porto on loan in 2016, André was in the club's youth ranks. André was playing for Liga Portugal 2 side Penafiel at the time of their deaths.

Jota was an avid gamer and was ranked world No. 1 in FIFA 21's Champions Leaderboard in February 2021. He had his own eSports team known as Luna Galaxy (formerly "Diogo Jota eSports") and regularly streamed on Twitch. During the COVID-19 pandemic lockdown he took part in an invitational series of FIFA matches, run by the Premier League, eventually defeating future Liverpool teammate Trent Alexander-Arnold in the final of the competition. On the first anniversary of the Jota's passing, EA Sport announced the Pro Championship Trophy would be renamed in his honour.

Jota married Rute Cardoso on 22 June 2025, 11 days before his death. The couple had three children.

== Death ==
Approximate key locations of Jota's fatal trip:
1 Jota leaves the University Hospital of São João in Porto at c. 20:30 WEST
2 Jota crosses the Portugal–Spain border on the A-75
3 Crash site on the A-52 near Cernadilla at c. 00:30
4 Benavente, intended overnight stop
5 Port of Santander, intended destination

Prior to his death, Jota had recently undergone minor lung surgery in Porto, Portugal, before getting married. On medical advice not to fly, Jota planned to return to England via a ferry leaving from Santander, Spain in order to return to training with Liverpool for the preseason. On 3 July 2025, he and his brother, André Silva, were driving to Santander to catch the ferry when, according to the Spanish Civil Guard, their Lamborghini Huracán suffered a tyre blowout while overtaking another vehicle on the A-52 motorway, causing the car to veer off the road near kilometre point 64 in the municipality of Cernadilla and catch fire. The crash occurred between 00:30 and 00:40 CEST. Emergency services later confirmed that both men died at the scene. Silva was 25 and Jota was 28. In a statement, the Spanish Civil Guard said that "all the evidence so far indicates" Jota was driving the vehicle at the time of the crash, and that the car "significantly exceeded the speed limit for the highway". The expert report is still being finalised and will be submitted to the court in Puebla de Sanabria.

A wake for the brothers was held on 4 July 2025 in Gondomar, Portugal, where hundreds of relatives, friends and public figures, including Prime Minister Luís Montenegro and President Marcelo Rebelo de Sousa, gathered to pay their respects. The funeral took place the following morning at the nearby Igreja Paroquial de Gondomar, with Bishop Manuel Linda of Porto presiding over the mass. Liverpool teammates Virgil van Dijk and Andy Robertson carried floral tributes dedicated to Jota and Silva, respectively, while Portugal and former Wolves teammate Rúben Neves served as a pallbearer for Jota's casket. Following the service, the brothers were buried side by side in the cemetery adjacent to the church.

=== Tributes ===
Jota's sudden death received international media coverage, as well as messages from various figures involved in football. Arne Slot, head coach of Liverpool at the time of Jota's death, released a statement through the club saying, "For us as a club, the sense of shock is absolute. Diogo was not just our player. He was a loved one to all of us. He was a teammate, a colleague, a workmate and in all of those roles he was very special." Fenway Sports Group CEO of football Michael Edwards and Liverpool sporting director Richard Hughes also released a joint statement through the club stating, "Of course, we – his Liverpool family – are also struggling to come to terms with what has happened. ... This is a tragedy that transcends Liverpool Football Club."

On 11 July 2025, Liverpool announced that Jota's number 20 jersey would be retired at all levels at the club. Later that day, Jota's widow visited the memorial site at Anfield with members of the brothers' family. They were joined by Liverpool players and staff to view the tributes that had been left and to pay their respects. A substantial number of past and present Liverpool players posted tribute messages to Jota on social media. Former Liverpool captain Jordan Henderson visited the Anfield memorial site in person. Liverpool also opened books of condolence at Anfield and digitally for Diogo and André. The club also confirmed they would pay out the remaining salary of his current contract in instalments, in full, to Jota's family. His previous team Wolverhampton Wanderers, and director of football operations and administration Matt Wild, said: "We are all completely shocked. It's such devastating news, not only for the passing of Diogo, which is just tragic enough, but to lose his brother as well." On the Liverpool website, Jota remains listed as a member of the team under a banner reading "Forever".

Jürgen Klopp, who signed Jota for Liverpool in 2020, said, "Diogo [Jota] was not only a fantastic player [for Liverpool], but also a great friend, a loving and caring husband and father! We will miss you so much!" Cristiano Ronaldo, his Portugal teammate and captain, stated, "It just doesn't make any sense [to me]. Just now we [him and Diogo Jota] were together in the national team, just now you were married." Rúben Neves, Francisco Conceição and several other Portugal teammates posted tributes to Jota. Former Liverpool player and manager Kenny Dalglish said: "Football is [currently] not important at this sad time. You feel helpless, knowing there's so little we can do to ease the pain [of his death] for his wife of just two weeks, [and] his three beautiful children."

FIFA president Gianni Infantino stated: "I am deeply saddened to hear of the tragic passing of Diogo Jota and his brother André Silva ... they will both be so sorely missed by all those who knew them and by the worldwide football community." Following a request by the Portuguese Football Federation, a moment of silence was held before all games at the UEFA Women's Euro 2025 on 3 and 4 July 2025, including a match between Portugal and Spain where players wore black armbands. Moments of silence also took place during the quarter-finals of the 2025 FIFA Club World Cup on 4 and 5 July and the flags at FIFA Headquarters in Zürich were flown at half-mast.

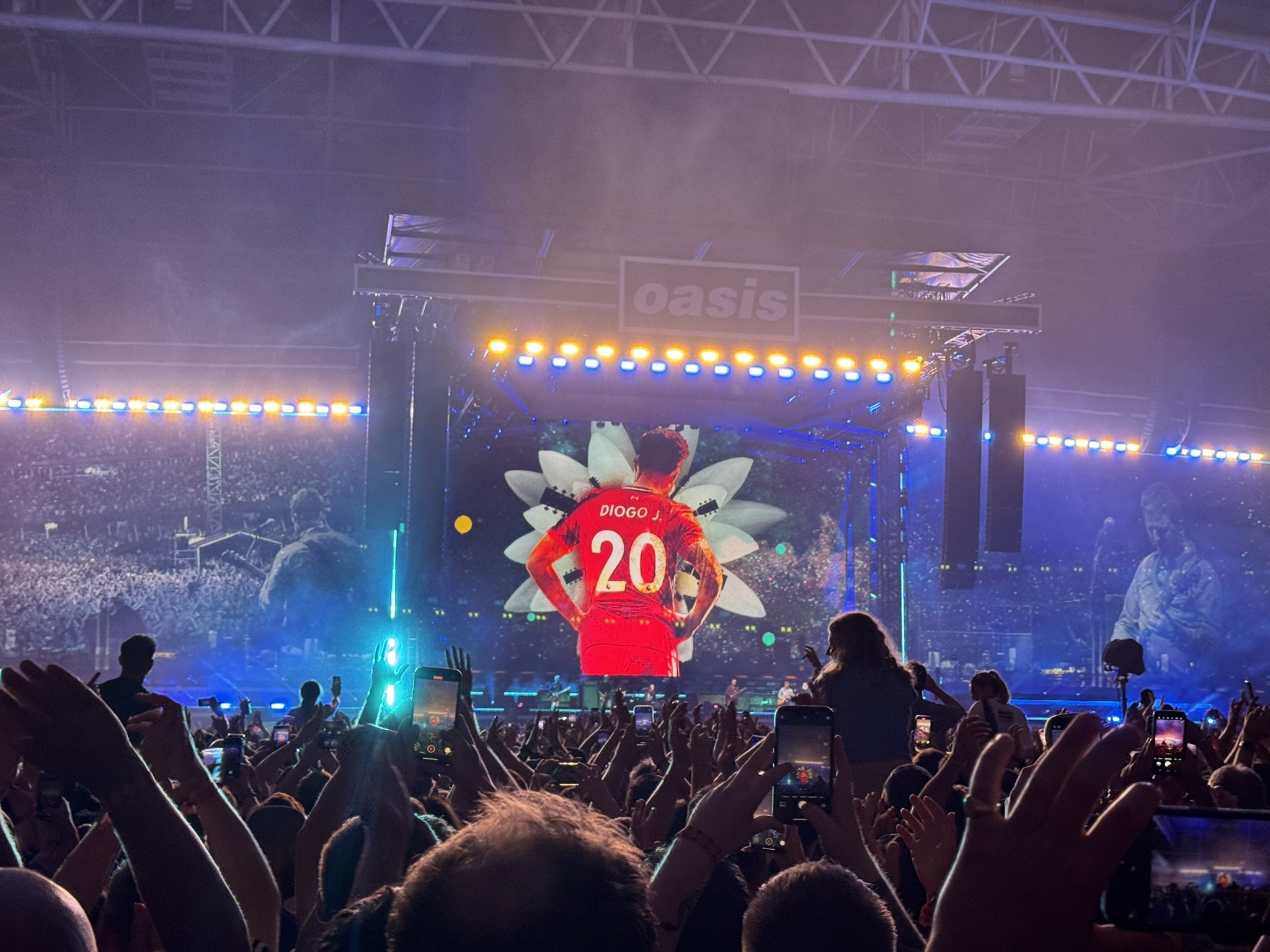
Oasis' tribute to Jota at their Live '25 tour at the Millennium Stadium, Cardiff.

Portuguese president Marcelo Rebelo de Sousa expressed shock, highlighting Jota's youth, promising career, and recent family happiness, remarking that "he had his whole future ahead of him". Prime Minister Luís Montenegro described the deaths as "unexpected and tragic", noting that Jota greatly honoured Portugal. Prince William, patron of the Football Association, also paid tribute, stating: "As part of the footballing family, I am deeply saddened to hear of the passing of Diogo Jota and his brother [André Silva]. Our thoughts are with his family, friends, and all who knew him."

Icelandic singer Laufey paid tribute to Jota on 3 July 2025 during her concert in Liverpool by performing a rendition of "You'll Never Walk Alone". English rock band Oasis paid tribute to Jota during the first show of their reunion tour on 4 July in Cardiff; whilst performing "Live Forever", an image of Jota in his kit appeared on the stage display. Oasis' opening act, the Liverpool-based group Cast, dedicated their song "Walkaway" to Jota. Portuguese-American guitarist Nuno Bettencourt commemorated Jota at the Back to the Beginning concert on 5 July at Villa Park. Before performing Black Sabbath's song "Changes" with Yungblud, Bettencourt dressed in Jota's Liverpool number 20 jersey.

On 13 July 2025, Liverpool paid tribute to Jota and his brother Silva during a pre-season friendly match against Preston North End at Deepdale. Before kick-off, players and supporters observed a minute's silence, with both teams wearing black armbands. Preston captain Ben Whiteman laid a wreath in front of the Liverpool fans, who displayed banners reading "Forever our number 20." A rendition of "You'll Never Walk Alone" was performed, and digital tributes were shown around the stadium. On 6 September, a moment of silence was held for Jota during Portugal's World Cup qualifying match against Armenia.

During the 2025 Ballon d'Or ceremony in Paris on 22 September, a tribute was paid to Jota and his brother Silva, featuring a moment of silence and a video montage in their honour. Jota was named an honorary member of Portugal's 2026 FIFA World Cup squad, and during Portugal's opening match against DR Congo on 17 June 2026, a tribute to Jota was displayed prior to kickoff.

== Career statistics ==
=== Club ===
Appearances and goals by club, season and competition
Club	Season	League			National cup (Note: Includes Taça de Portugal, FA Cup)		League cup (Note: Includes Taça da Liga, EFL Cup)		Europe		Total	
Club	Season	Division	Apps	Goals	Apps	Goals	Apps	Goals	Apps	Goals	Apps	Goals
Paços de Ferreira	2014–15	Primeira Liga	10	2	1	1	0	0	—		11	3
Paços de Ferreira	2015–16	Primeira Liga	31	12	1	0	2	0	—		34	12
Paços de Ferreira	Total		41	14	2	1	2	0	—		45	15
Atlético Madrid	2016–17	La Liga	0	0	—		—		—		0	0
Porto (loan)	2016–17	Primeira Liga	27	8	1	0	1	0	8 (Note: Appearances in UEFA Champions League)	1	37	9
Wolverhampton Wanderers (loan)	2017–18	Championship	44	17	1	1	1	0	—		46	18
Wolverhampton Wanderers	2018–19	Premier League	33	9	3	1	1	0	—		37	10
Wolverhampton Wanderers	2019–20	Premier League	34	7	0	0	0	0	14 (Note: Appearances in UEFA Europa League)	9	48	16
Wolverhampton Wanderers	Total		111	33	4	2	2	0	14	9	131	44
Liverpool	2020–21	Premier League	19	9	0	0	2	0	9	4	30	13
Liverpool	2021–22	Premier League	35	15	5	2	4	3	11	1	55	21
Liverpool	2022–23	Premier League	22	7	0	0	0	0	6	0	28	7
Liverpool	2023–24	Premier League	21	10	2	1	4	1	5	3	32	15
Liverpool	2024–25	Premier League	26	6	2	1	5	2	4	0	37	9
Liverpool	Total		123	47	9	4	15	6	35	8	182	65
Career total			302	102	16	7	20	6	57	18	395	133

=== International ===
Appearances and goals by national team and year
National team	Year	Apps	Goals
Portugal	2019	2	0
Portugal	2020	8	3
Portugal	2021	12	5
Portugal	2022	7	2
Portugal	2023	7	2
Portugal	2024	10	2
Portugal	2025	3	0
Total		49	14

Scores and results list Portugal's goal tally first, score column indicates score after each Jota goal.

List of international goals scored by Diogo Jota
No.	Date	Venue	Cap	Opponent	Score	Result	Competition	Ref.
1	5 September 2020	Estádio do Dragão, Porto, Portugal	3	Croatia	2–0	4–1	2020–21 UEFA Nations League A	
2	14 October 2020	Estádio José Alvalade, Lisbon, Portugal	7	Sweden	2–0	3–0	2020–21 UEFA Nations League A	
3	14 October 2020	Estádio José Alvalade, Lisbon, Portugal	7	Sweden	3–0	3–0	2020–21 UEFA Nations League A	
4	27 March 2021	Red Star Stadium, Belgrade, Serbia	11	Serbia	1–0	2–2	2022 FIFA World Cup qualification	
5	27 March 2021	Red Star Stadium, Belgrade, Serbia	11	Serbia	2–0	2–2	2022 FIFA World Cup qualification	
6	30 March 2021	Stade Josy Barthel, Luxembourg City, Luxembourg	12	Luxembourg	1–1	3–1	2022 FIFA World Cup qualification	
7	19 June 2021	Allianz Arena, Munich, Germany	16	Germany	2–4	2–4	UEFA Euro 2020	
8	7 September 2021	Baku Olympic Stadium, Baku, Azerbaijan	21	Azerbaijan	3–0	3–0	2022 FIFA World Cup qualification	
9	24 March 2022	Estádio do Dragão, Porto, Portugal	23	Turkey	2–0	3–1	2022 FIFA World Cup qualification	
10	24 September 2022	Fortuna Arena, Prague, Czech Republic	28	Czech Republic	4–0	4–0	2022–23 UEFA Nations League A	
11	11 September 2023	Estádio Algarve, Algarve, Portugal	33	Luxembourg	5–0	9–0	UEFA Euro 2024 qualifying	
12	11 September 2023	Estádio Algarve, Algarve, Portugal	33	Luxembourg	7–0	9–0	UEFA Euro 2024 qualifying	
13	4 June 2024	Estádio José Alvalade, Lisbon, Portugal	37	Finland	2–0	4–2	Friendly	
14	8 June 2024	Estádio Nacional, Oeiras, Portugal	38	Croatia	1–1	1–2	Friendly	

== Honours ==
Wolverhampton Wanderers

- EFL Championship: 2017–18

Liverpool

- Premier League: 2024–25
- FA Cup: 2021–22
- EFL Cup: 2021–22, 2023–24; runner-up: 2024–25
- UEFA Champions League runner-up: 2021–22

Portugal

- UEFA Nations League: 2018–19, 2024–25

Individual

- Retired number #20 at Liverpool: posthumous honour
- Wolverhampton Wanderers Hall of Fame
- Premier League Player of the Month: January 2024
- SJPF Young Player of the Month: October/November 2015
- Primeira Liga Goal of the Month: February 2016
- UEFA Champions League Breakthrough XI: 2020
