= André Silva (footballer, born 2000) =

Portuguese footballer (2000–2025)

- Silva with Penafiel in 2025

Personal information
- Full name: André Filipe Teixeira da Silva
- Date of birth: 28 April 2000
- Place of birth: Gondomar, Portugal
- Date of death: 3 July 2025 (aged 25)
- Place of death: Cernadilla, Spain
- Height: 1.73 m (5 ft 8 in)
- Positions: Attacking midfielder; winger

Youth career
- 2008–2011: Gondomar
- 2011–2017: Porto
- 2015–2016: → Padroense (loan)
- 2017–2019: Paços Ferreira
- 2019–2020: Famalicão
- 2020–2021: Boavista

Senior career*
Years	Team	Apps	(Gls)
2021–2023	Gondomar	37	(9)
2023–2025	Penafiel	59	(6)
Total		96	(15)
- * Club domestic league appearances and goals

André Filipe Teixeira da Silva (28 April 2000 – 3 July 2025) was a Portuguese professional footballer who played as an attacking midfielder and a left winger.

He played for several clubs at youth level, including Porto. His senior career began in 2021, and consisted of two seasons each with Gondomar in the Campeonato de Portugal and Penafiel in the Liga Portugal 2.

In July 2025, Silva and his brother Diogo Jota both died in a car crash in Spain.

== Career ==
Born in Gondomar, Porto District, Silva started playing football at local club Gondomar before joining Porto's youth setup in 2011; he also appeared for their satellite team Padroense, his teammates including Fábio Vieira and Vitinha. He completed his development at Paços de Ferreira, Famalicão and Boavista.

Silva returned to Gondomar in 2021 and played two seasons of senior football in the fourth-division Campeonato de Portugal, also taking part in the Taça de Portugal. In the 2022–23 season, he recorded nine goals and two assists in 26 games.

On 1 July 2023, Silva joined Penafiel on a three-year contract. He made his debut in the Liga Portugal 2 on 13 August, scoring in a 3–0 home win over Leixões.

On 21 February 2025, Silva was voted player of the match of the fixture against Portimonense also at the Estádio Municipal 25 de Abril; he opened the 3–0 victory in the fifth minute, and when Yuki Kobayashi closed it by scoring in his own net towards the end of the first half, he was also involved. He was a regular starter under manager Hélder, totalling 62 appearances, seven goals and three assists during his two-year stint. His side led the table in 2024–25, before declining in the second half of the campaign.

== Personal life ==
Silva's elder brother Diogo Jota was a Portuguese international, and a Premier League winner with Liverpool in the 2024–25 season. Both started their careers at Gondomar and played for Paços de Ferreira at youth level. The former was in the youth ranks of Porto when the latter joined the club's first team on loan in 2016.

Silva attended a university course in business management alongside his football career, and set up a company with his brother. He graduated shortly before his death.

== Death ==
On 3 July 2025, Silva died aged 25, alongside his brother Diogo, 28, in a car crash on the A‑52 motorway in Cernadilla, Spain. According to reports, their Lamborghini suffered a tyre blowout while overtaking another car and veered off the road before catching fire; Spanish emergency services confirmed both died at the scene. In a statement, the Spanish Civil Guard said that "all the evidence so far indicates" Diogo was driving the vehicle at the time of the crash, and that the car "significantly exceeded the speed limit for the highway". The expert report is still being finalised and will be submitted to the court in Puebla de Sanabria.

Silva's Penafiel coach, Hélder, paid tribute to him by saying he brought speed and his personality to the game. He added that the club would prefer to think of the brothers' family rather than football.

On 5 July 2025, Silva and Jota's funeral was held at the Igreja Paroquial de Gondomar, with hundreds of relatives, friends and acquaintances in attendance. The bishop of Porto, Manuel Linda, led the brothers' funeral mass. Andy Robertson carried a floral arrangement dedicated to Silva, while fellow Liverpool teammate Virgil van Dijk carried a similar one dedicated to Jota. Following a procession of their caskets, they were buried at the cemetery next to the church.
