= Ajuda =

- Civil parish
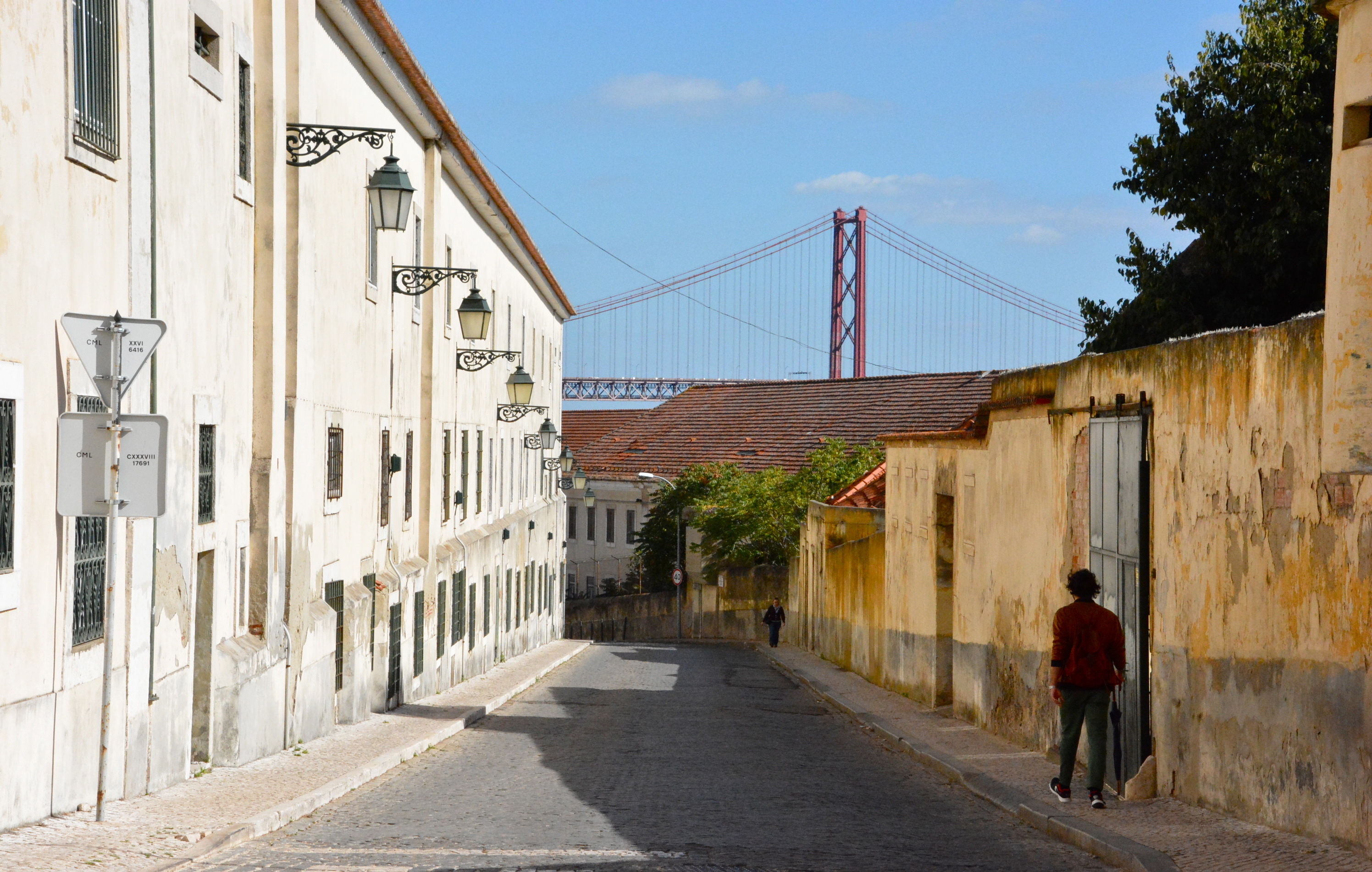
- Clockwise: Ajuda National Palace; Ajuda Botanical Garden; streets of Ajuda; Botanical Garden; Igreja da Memória.

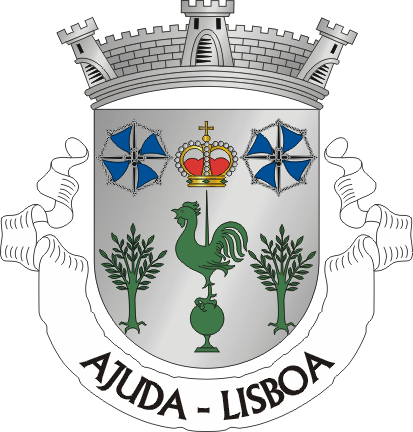
- Coat of arms

- Coordinates: 38.706°N 9.199°W
- Country: Portugal
- Region: Lisbon
- Metropolitan area: Lisbon
- District: Lisbon
- Municipality: Lisbon

Area
  - Total: 2.88 km^{2} (1.11 sq mi)

Population (2011)
  - Total: 15,617
  - Density: 5,420/km^{2} (14,000/sq mi)
- Time zone: UTC+00:00 (WET)
  - Summer (DST): UTC+01:00 (WEST)
- Postal code: 1300
- Area code: 213
- Patron: Nossa Senhora da Ajuda
- Website: www.jf-ajuda.pt

Ajuda (European Portuguese pronunciation: [ɐˈʒuðɐ]) is a freguesia (civil parish) and district of Lisbon, the capital of Portugal. Ajuda is located in western Lisbon, northeast of Belém and west of Alcântara. The population in 2011 was 15,617.

== History ==
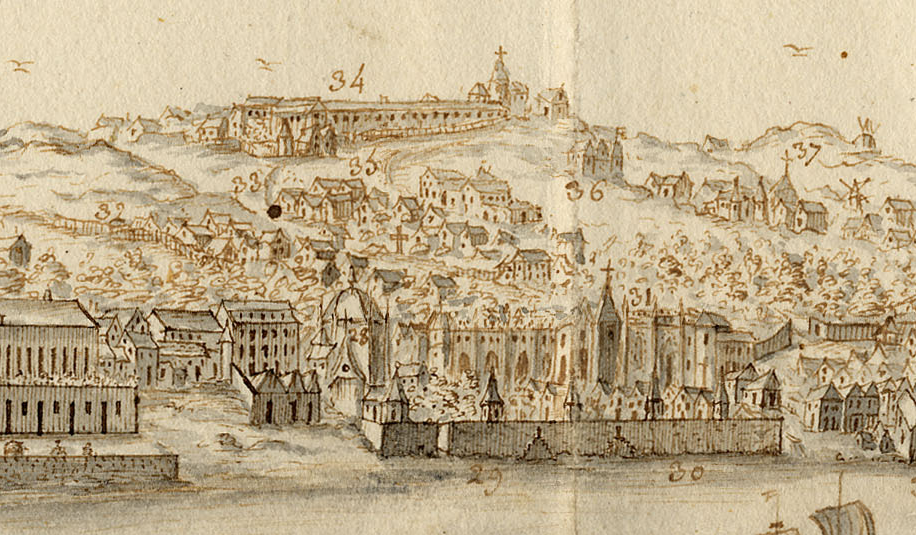
View of Ajuda and Belém in 1763.

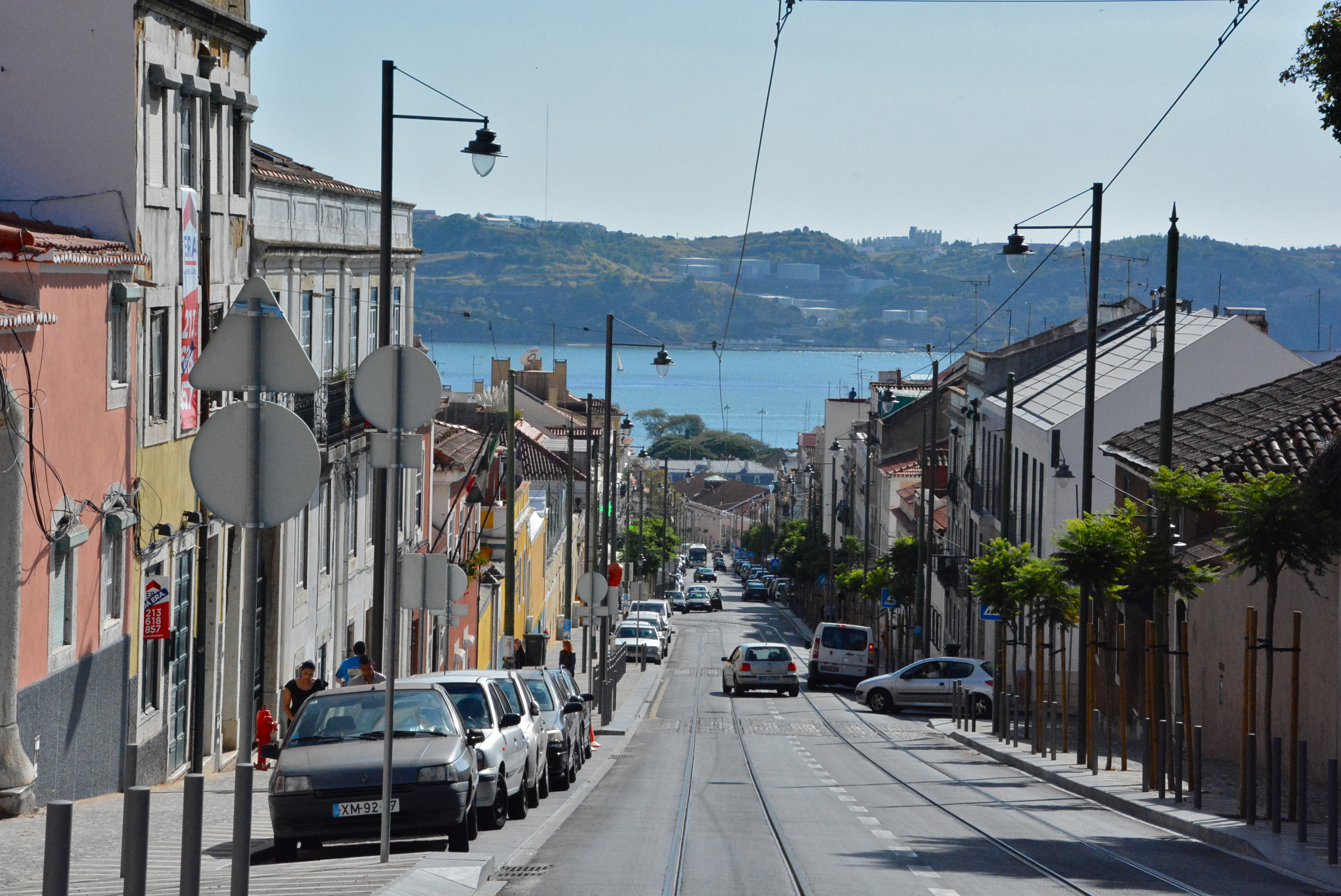
View down the Calçada da Ajuda which links Ajuda to Belém.

The parish of Ajuda, situated between the beach area of Belém and the foothills of the Monsanto was a place that was not conditioned for agriculture. A legend tells of a shepherd experienced an apparition of the Virgin Mary while passing the area. News of the event spread rapidly, and the area was visited by the faithful, many of whom settled there around a chapel built at the site of the vision. The small sanctuary was eventually replaced by a church, and the number of pilgrims grew to include members of the upper class and high nobility, who attended religious services. Queen Catherine of Austria, the consort of King John III of Portugal, eventually visited and prayed at the church, influencing members of the nobility to build residences in the area.

Ajuda became an ecclesiastical parish in 1551.

During the 1755 Lisbon earthquake, Ajuda did not escape the destruction, losing many of the buildings constructed over the centuries. This included the Convento de Nossa Senhora da Boa Hora (English: Convent of Our Lady of the Good Hour), which was later reconstructed by the Augustine monks in 1756. The royal family too had to abandon the Palácio da Ribeira (English: Ribeira Palace), and began living, along the court, in the Quinta de Cima in Ajuda, initially in wooden buildings, locally called the Real Barraca (English: Royal Lodge).

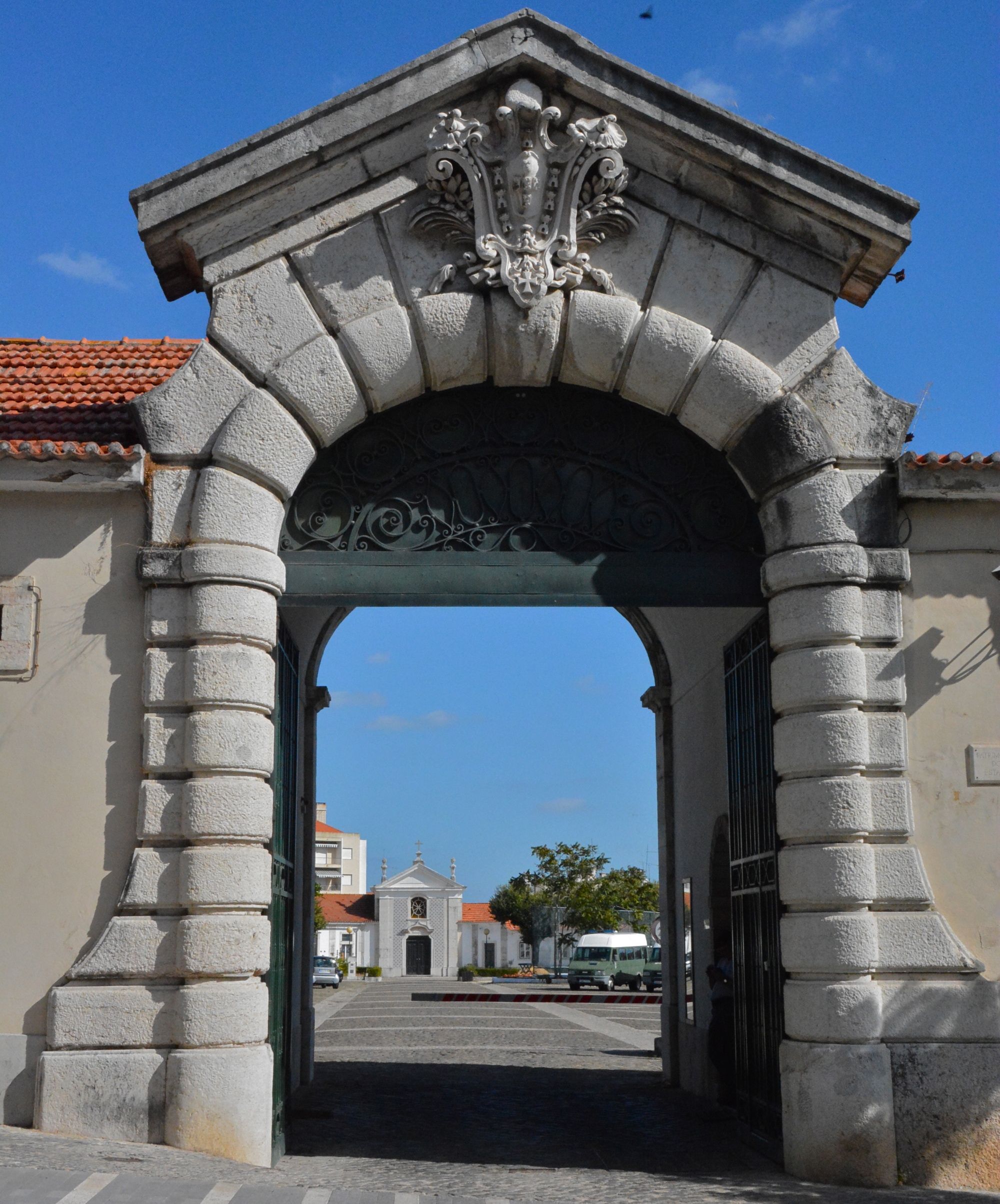
Forte Conde de Lippe.

The level of insecurity after the earthquake and tsunami forced many to install themselves in Ajuda; the population grew from 1059 inhabitants to 4748 residents. The village consisted of five separate agglomerations clustered around the roadways: Calçada da Ajuda (alongside Alcântara); Travessa da Estopa; Calçada de Nossa Senhora da Ajuda; Rua das Mercês and Rua da Paz.

In 1762, Ajuda became a part of the municipality of Lisbon and dropped pretenses of a suburban locality. The parish was an agglomeration of houses, manors, quarries, earthen stoves and windmills. In 1768, the Marquis of Pombal, as part of his reconstruction initiatives, built the Botanical Gardens in the area of Horta da Quinta de Cima. It was also around that time, between 1766 and 1787, that Pina Manique had constructed the Ajuda Cemetery, where many of the royal servants were buried. The Real Barraca was subsequently replaced by a grande palace, the Ajuda National Palace; the construction began in 1795, but its construction was interrupted by the French invasion of Portugal and subsequent escape of the royal family to the colony of Brazil, but completed in the middle of the 19th century. It would become the official residence of King Carlos I.

Between 1852 and 1885 Ajuda became integrated into the municipality of Belém, but was re-inserted by the end of the 19th century.

Since the late part of the 20th century, the population has decreased, due to the exodus to the suburbs and periphery of the city.

== Architecture ==
=== Palaces ===
- Palácio Nacional da Ajuda (English: Ajuda National Palace) - initiated by Manuel Caetano de Sousa, the project was actually begun in 1795 (cornerstone), but under the directorship of Francisco Xavier Fabri and José da Costa e Silva the actual construction began in 1802, with many neo-classical influences and later remodelled by Francisco Rosa. Until 1910 it was the official residence of the King of Portugal.

=== Parks and gardens ===
- Jardim Botânico da Ajuda located in Calçada da Ajuda opposite to the Palácio Nacional da Ajuda. It was built in 1768, during the time of King Joseph I, with the aim to his grandchildren learning about the various collection of plants (with over 5000 specimen) from Africa, Asia, and America. It is the first and the oldest Botanical Garden in Portugal. It is open every day from 9:00 a.m. to 6:00 p.m. (Winter) and 8:00 p.m. (Summer); closed on December 25 and January 1.

=== School ===
- Portuguese School of Equestrian Art
