= Diocese of Vila Real =

Diocese of the Catholic Church

Diocese of Vila Real Dioecesis Vilaregalensis Diocese de Vila Real

Catholic
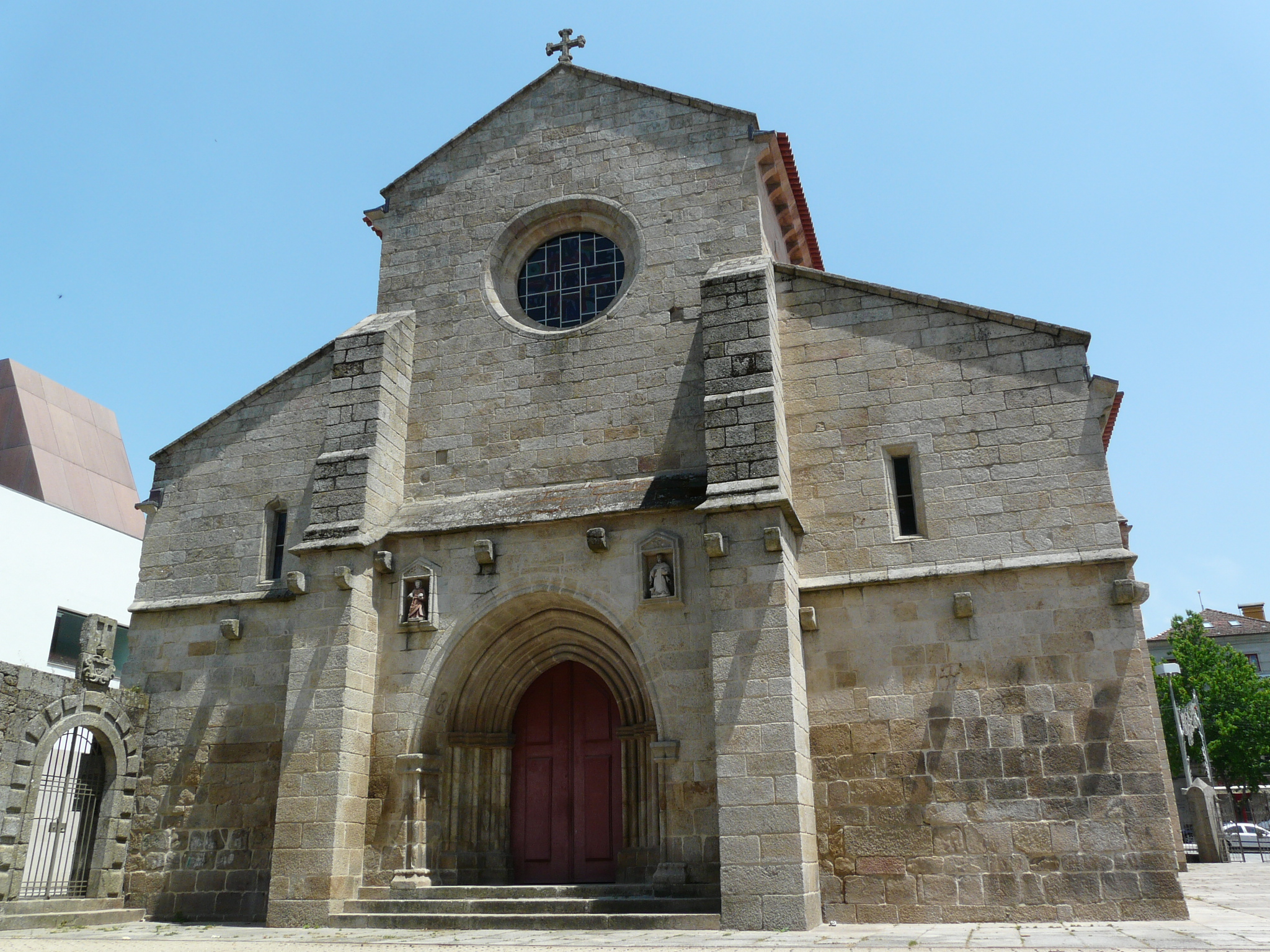
- Cathedral of Vila Real

Location
- Country: Portugal
- Ecclesiastical province: Braga
- Metropolitan: Roman Catholic Archdiocese of Braga

Statistics
- Area: 4,273 km^{2} (1,650 sq mi)
- Population: Total; Catholics: (as of 2023); 185,900; 164,960 (88.7%)
- Parishes: 264

Information
- Denomination: Catholic Church
- Sui iuris church: Latin Church
- Rite: Roman Rite
- Established: 20 April 1922; 104 years ago
- Cathedral: Cathedral of St Dominic in Vila Real
- Patron saint: Immaculate Conception
- Secular priests: 118

Current leadership
- Pope: Leo XIV
- Bishop: António Augusto Azevedo
- Metropolitan Archbishop: José Manuel Garcia Cordeiro
- Bishops emeritus: Amândio José Tomás

Map
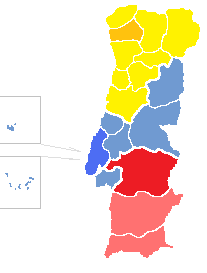

Website
- Website of the Diocese

The Diocese of Vila Real (Latin: Dioecesis Villaregalensis) is a Latin Church diocese of the Catholic Church in Portugal. It has existed since 1922. In that year it was formed from territories in the diocese of Bragança-Miranda, archdiocese of Braga, and diocese of Lamego. It is a suffragan of the archdiocese of Braga, in the Norte region, with its see at the Cathedral of Vila Real.

== Leadership ==
Bishops of Vila Real (all Roman Rite)

- João Evangelista de Lima Vidal (23 May 1923 – 31 May 1933), resigned
- António Valente da Fonseca (31 May 1933 – 10 Jan 1967), resigned
- António Cardoso Cunha (10 Jan 1967 – 19 Jan 1991), retired
- Joaquim Gonçalves (19 Jan 1991 – 17 May 2011), retired
- Amândio José Tomás (17 May 2011 – 11 May 2019), retired
- António Augusto Azevedo (11 May 2019 – Present)

Coadjutor Bishops of Vila Real

- António Cardoso Cunha (1966-1967), elevated to Bishop
- Joaquim Gonçalves (1987-1991), elevated to Bishop
- Amândio José Tomás (2008-2011), elevated to Bishop

Notable Ordinaries of Vila Real

- Auxiliary Bishops:
  - António de Castro Xavier Monteiro (1964-1966), appointed Auxiliary Archbishop (personal title) of Lisbon, Portugal
- Priests:
  - Gilberto Canavarro dos Reis (1963-1988), appointed Auxiliary Bishop of Porto, Portugal
  - Cardinal António Marto (1971-2000), appointed Auxiliary Bishop of Braga, Portugal
  - Manuel Linda (1981-2009), appointed Auxiliary Bishop of Braga, Portugal
  - Sérgio Dinis (1994-2024), appointed Military Ordinary of Portugal
