= Bergentheim =

Bergentheim Banthum
- Village
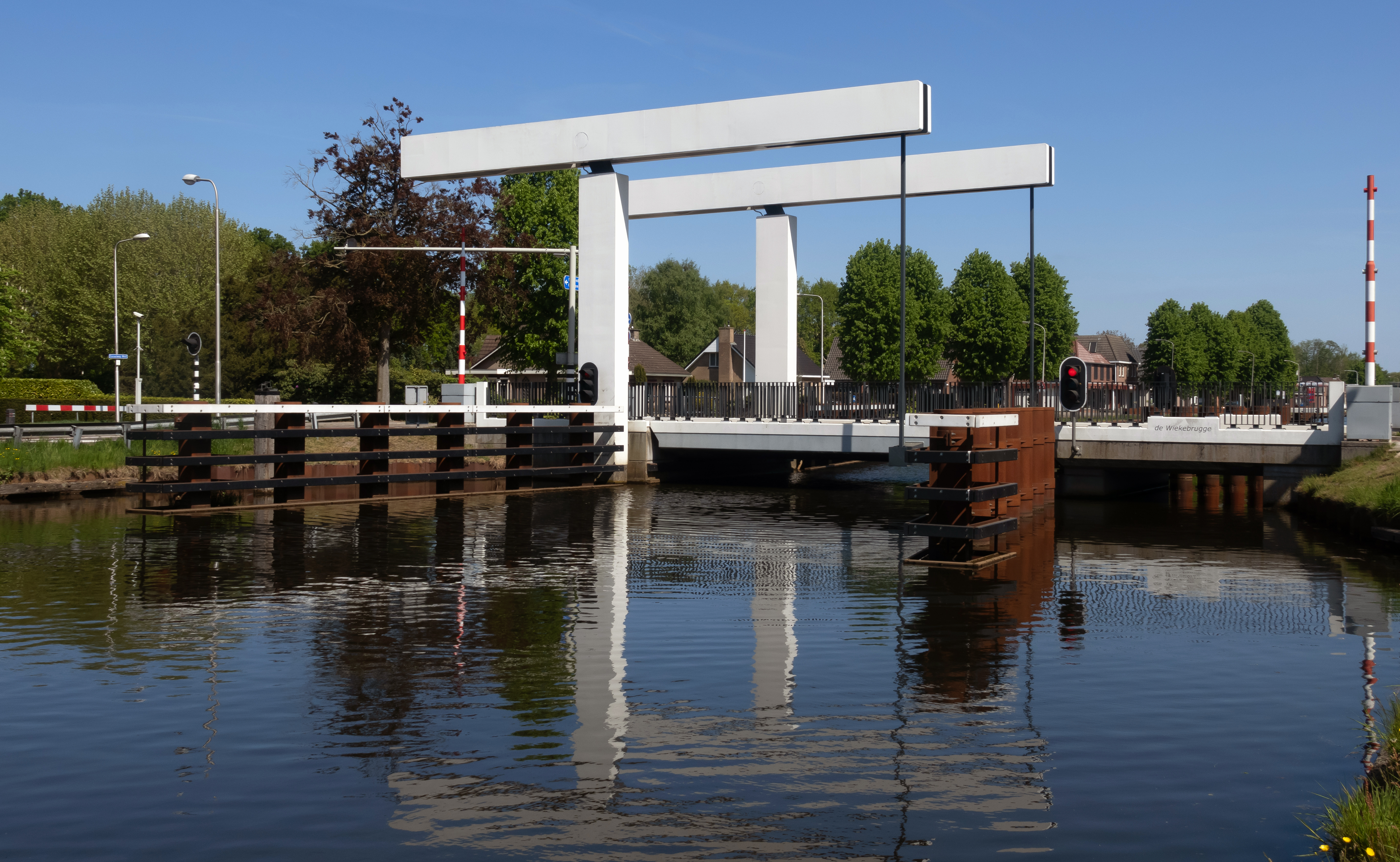
- Bergentheim Bridge

- Location in province of Overijssel in the Netherlands Bergentheim (Netherlands)
- Coordinates: 52°31′35″N 6°36′50″E
- Country: Netherlands
- Province: Overijssel
- Municipality: Hardenberg

Area
  - Total: 19.56 km^{2} (7.55 sq mi)
- Elevation: 9 m (30 ft)

Population (2021)
  - Total: 3,460
  - Density: 177/km^{2} (458/sq mi)
- Time zone: UTC+1 (CET)
  - Summer (DST): UTC+2 (CEST)
- Postal code: 7691
- Dialing code: 0523

Bergentheim (Dutch Low Saxon: Banthum) is a village in the municipality of Hardenberg, the Netherlands. Located between the Almelo-De Haandrik canal and the Zwolle-Emmen railway, the town used to have a railway station, but it was closed in 1975 and demolished in August 1993.

== Overview ==
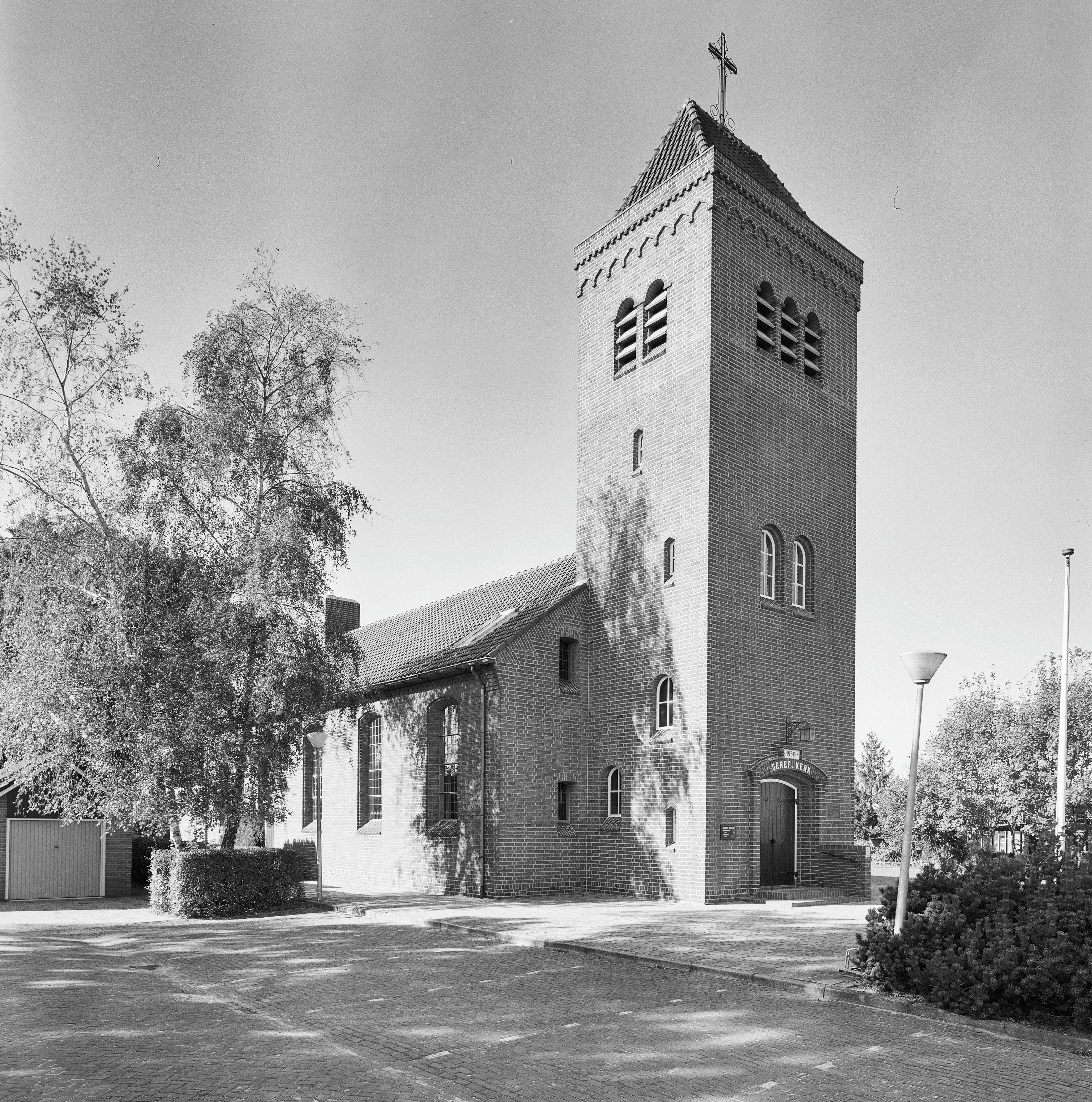
The church of Bergentheim

The village was first mentioned in 1381-1383 as Bergenthem. The etymology is unclear, because it has always contained a "t". Around 1835, a peat excavation concession was obtained by I.A. van Royen. A small settlement with a school, church, shop and pub appeared at the intersection of two canals. In 1840, it was home to 243 people. In 1905, a railway station opened in Bergentheim, closing in 1975.

== Industry ==
Bergentheim used to have a large bread factory, which was established just after World War II by the Schipper family, known as the NOH (Noord Oost Hoek) bakkerijen, and later Bakkersland. It closed in 2005. Nowadays, the area's major employers are the Lensen Toppoint industry for writing instruments and promotional items, and the local Wavin factory.

== Notable people ==
- Kyra Lamberink (born 1996), track cyclist
- Arne Slot (born 1978), professional football coach, former head coach of Liverpool F.C.
