= Joaquim Gonçalves =

- Bishop of Vila Real
- Church: Catholic Church
- Diocese: Diocese of Vila Real
- In office: 19 January 1991 – 17 May 2011
- Predecessor: António Cardoso Cunha
- Successor: Amândio José Tomás

Orders
- Ordination: 10 July 1960
- Consecration: 18 October 1981 by Eurico Dias Nogueira

Personal details
- Born: 17 May 1936 Revelhe, Fafe, Braga District, Portugal
- Died: 31 December 2013 (aged 77)

D. Joaquim Gonçalves (17 May 1936 – 31 December 2013) was a Portuguese Roman Catholic bishop.

Ordained to the priesthood on 10 July 1960, Gonçalves was named bishop of the Roman Catholic Diocese of Vila Real, Portugal on 19 January 1991 and retired on 17 May 2011.
