= Cernadilla =

Coordinates: 42°01′N 6°25′W

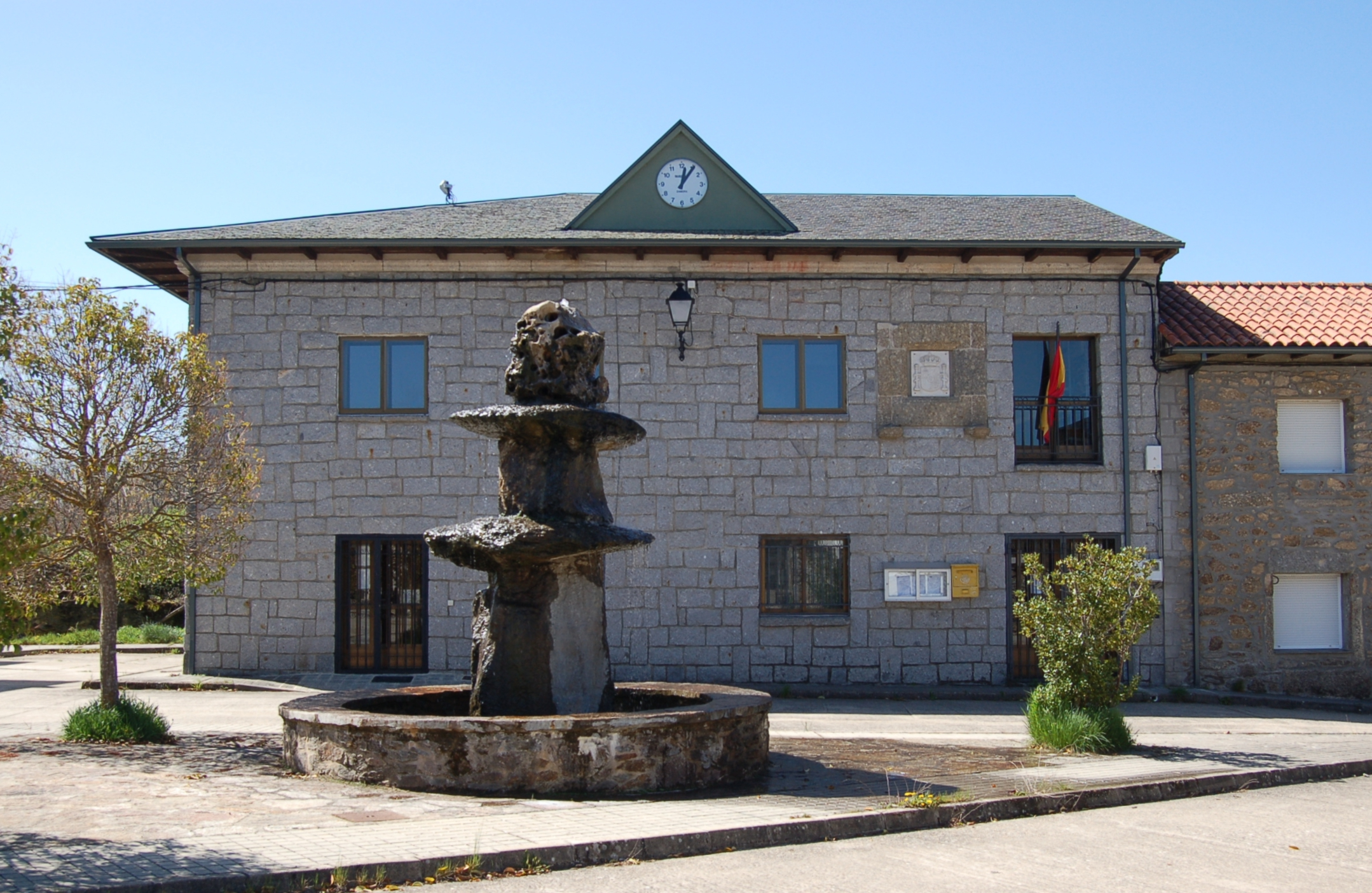
- Interactive map of Cernadilla
- Country: Spain
- Autonomous community: Castile and León
- Province: Zamora

Area
  - Total: 36 km^{2} (14 sq mi)

Population (2025-01-01)
  - Total: 105
  - Density: 2.9/km^{2} (7.6/sq mi)
- Time zone: UTC+1 (CET)
  - Summer (DST): UTC+2 (CEST)

Cernadilla (Asturleonese: Cernadiella) is a municipality of Spain located in the province of Zamora, autonomous community of Castile and León. It belongs to the La Carballeda traditional comarca. According to 2024 INE figures, the municipality had a population of 110 inhabitants.

== History ==
In the Middle Ages, Cernadilla was incorporated into the Kingdom of León, whose monarchs undertook the repopulation of western Zamora.

During the Modern Age, Cernadilla was part of the province of the Lands of the Count of Benavente, and within this, part of the Receivership of Sanabria. The Venta de Cernadilla, owned by the Counts of Benavente, was a testament to the Count's jurisdiction over the area and its subjects well into the 19th century.

In any case, when the provinces were restructured and the current ones were created in 1833, Cernadilla became part of the province of Zamora, within the Region of León, being integrated in 1834 into the judicial district of Puebla de Sanabria. At this time, Pascual Madoz points out that two looms and two water mills operated in this place, one on the permanent Tera and another winter mill on the town stream.

In 1940 the municipality of Cernadilla took its current extension, when the old municipality of Valdemerilla was integrated into its area.

Cernadilla came to international attention in July 2025 when Portuguese footballer Diogo Jota and his brother André Silva were killed in a single-vehicle collision on the A-52 motorway near the village Cernadilla.

== Villages ==
- Cernadilla
- Anta de Tera
- San Salvador de Palazuelos
- Valdemerilla
