= Cathedral of Vila Real =

Cathedral in Vila Real, Portugal

Coordinates: 41.2963°N 7.7466°W

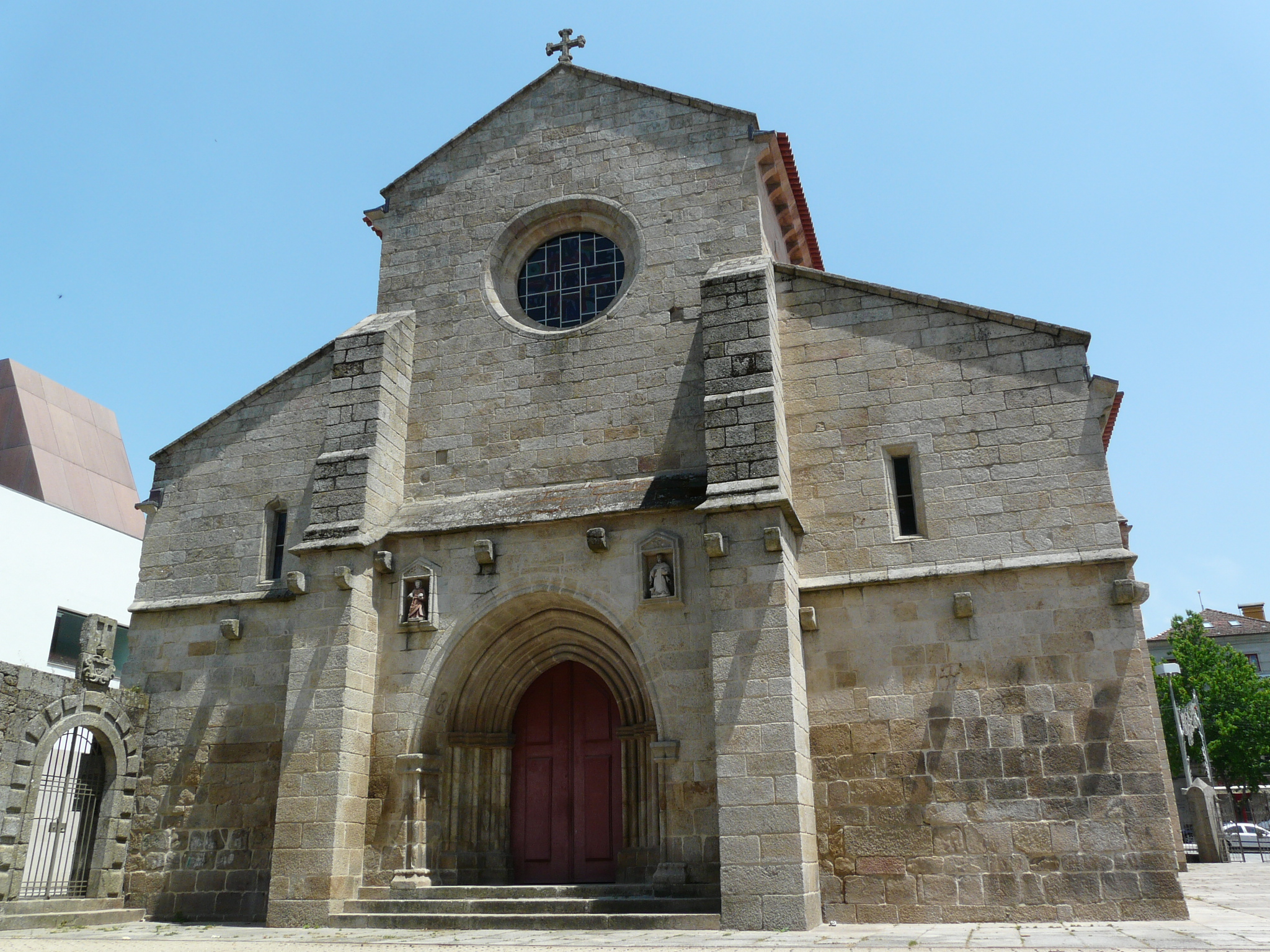

The Cathedral of Vila Real (Portuguese: Sé de Vila Real), also known as the Church of St. Dominic (Portuguese: Igreja de São Domingos) is a Roman Catholic cathedral in Vila Real, Portugal. It is the seat of the Diocese of Vila Real.

Dominican friars from Guimaraes built it as a convent in 1424; it is an example of Gothic architecture. Since 19 February 1926, it has been classified as a National Monument.
