= Igreja da Memória =

Church in Ajuda, Lisbon District, Portugal

Coordinates: 38.7030°N 9.2020°W

Igreja da Memória, Ajuda (Lisbon)

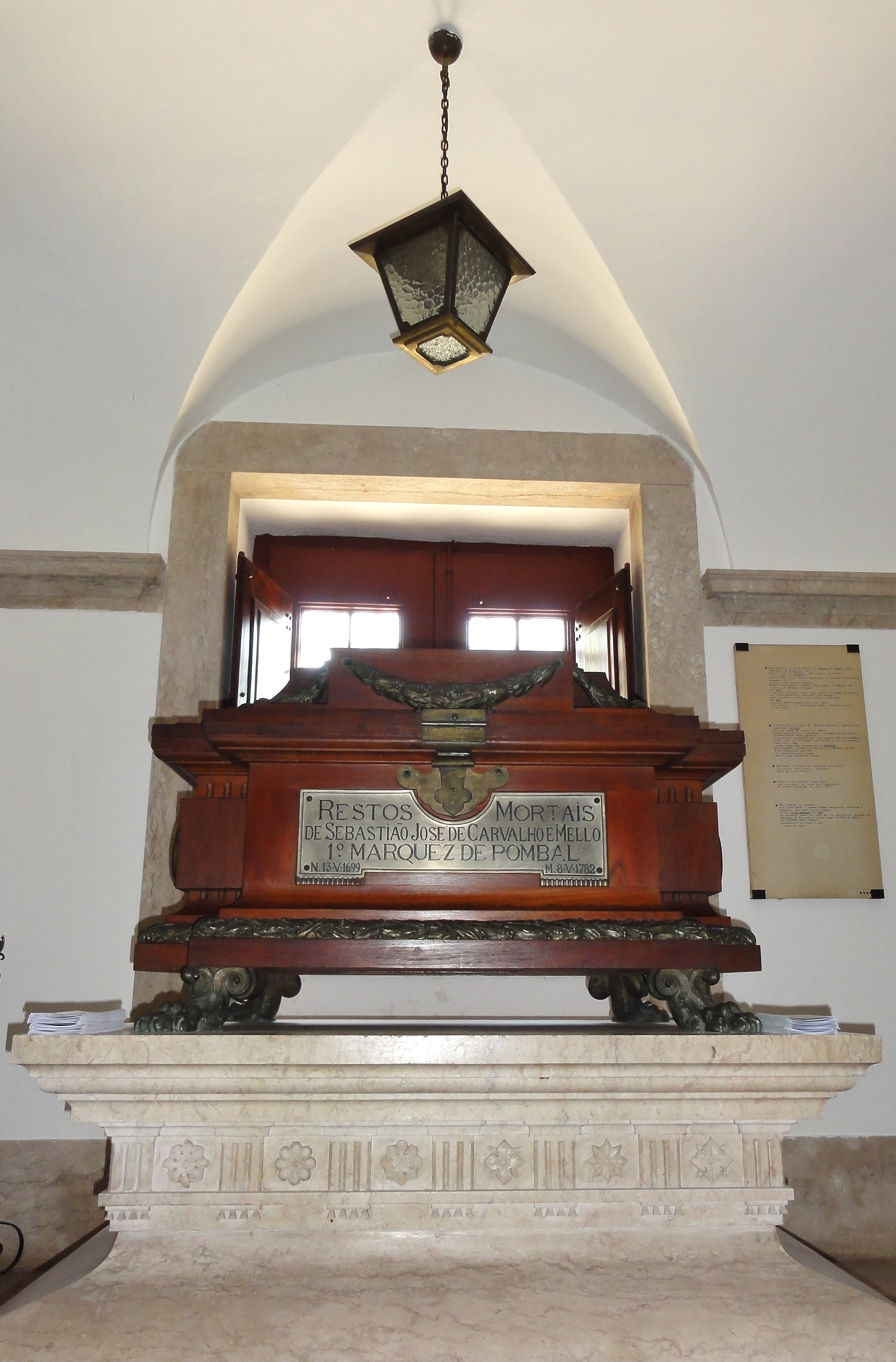
Marquis of Pombal mausoleum at the Igreja da Memória, Ajuda (Lisbon)

Memory Church (Portuguese: Igreja da Memória) is a church in Ajuda (Lisbon), Portugal. It holds the Mausoleum of the Sebastião José de Carvalho e Melo, 1st Marquis of Pombal. It is classified as a National Monument.

== About ==
The Memory Church built entirely of limestone was dedicated to the survival of the King Joseph I from the assassination attempt by Távora family in 1758. The church was constructed in Baroque style with neoclassical characteristics and crowned by a dome.

The Memory Church was classified as National Monument in 1923.

== See also ==
- Churches in Portugal
- 18th-century Western domes

== Gallery ==
Main façade

Interior looking toward the chancel

Main altar

Interior of the dome

Interior looking toward the entrance
