= Igreja Paroquial de Gondomar =

Roman Catholic church in Gondomar, Portugal

Coordinates: 41.1352°N 8.5328°W

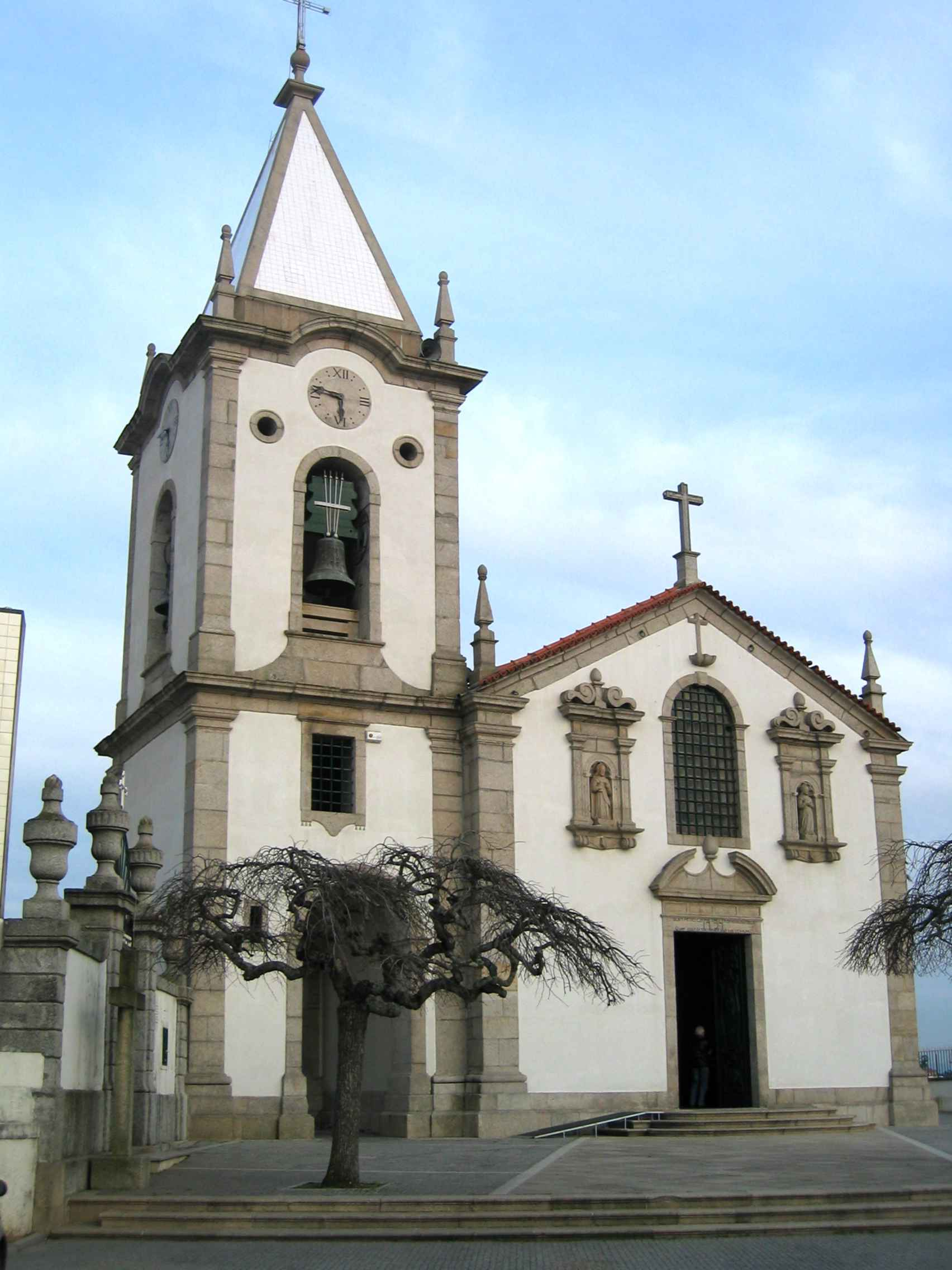

The Igreja Matriz de Gondomar, also referred to as the Igreja Paroquial de Gondomar and Igreja de São Cosme e São Damião, is located in the current parish of Gondomar (São Cosme), Valbom e Jovim, in the city and municipality of Gondomar, District of Porto, Portugal.

An inscription above the main portal indicates that construction began in 1727. The Baroque-style church has a bell tower on its north side. On the front side, there are niches containing portraits of the church's patron saints, Cosmas and Damian.

The furnishings include a carved and gilded altarpiece on the main altar and side altars, a painted coffered ceiling and statues of saints, including a portrait of the Virgin and child.

== Gallery ==
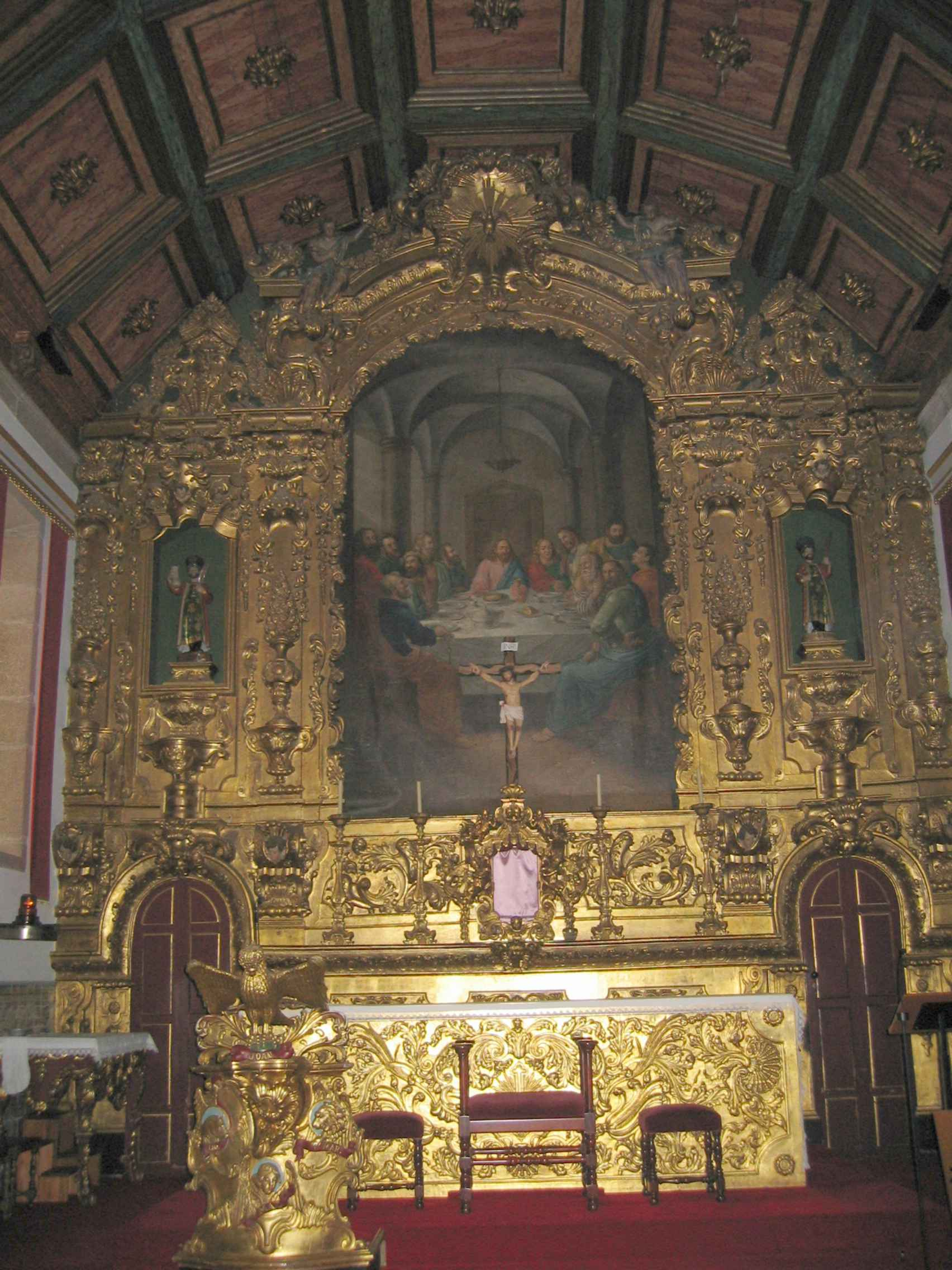
High altar

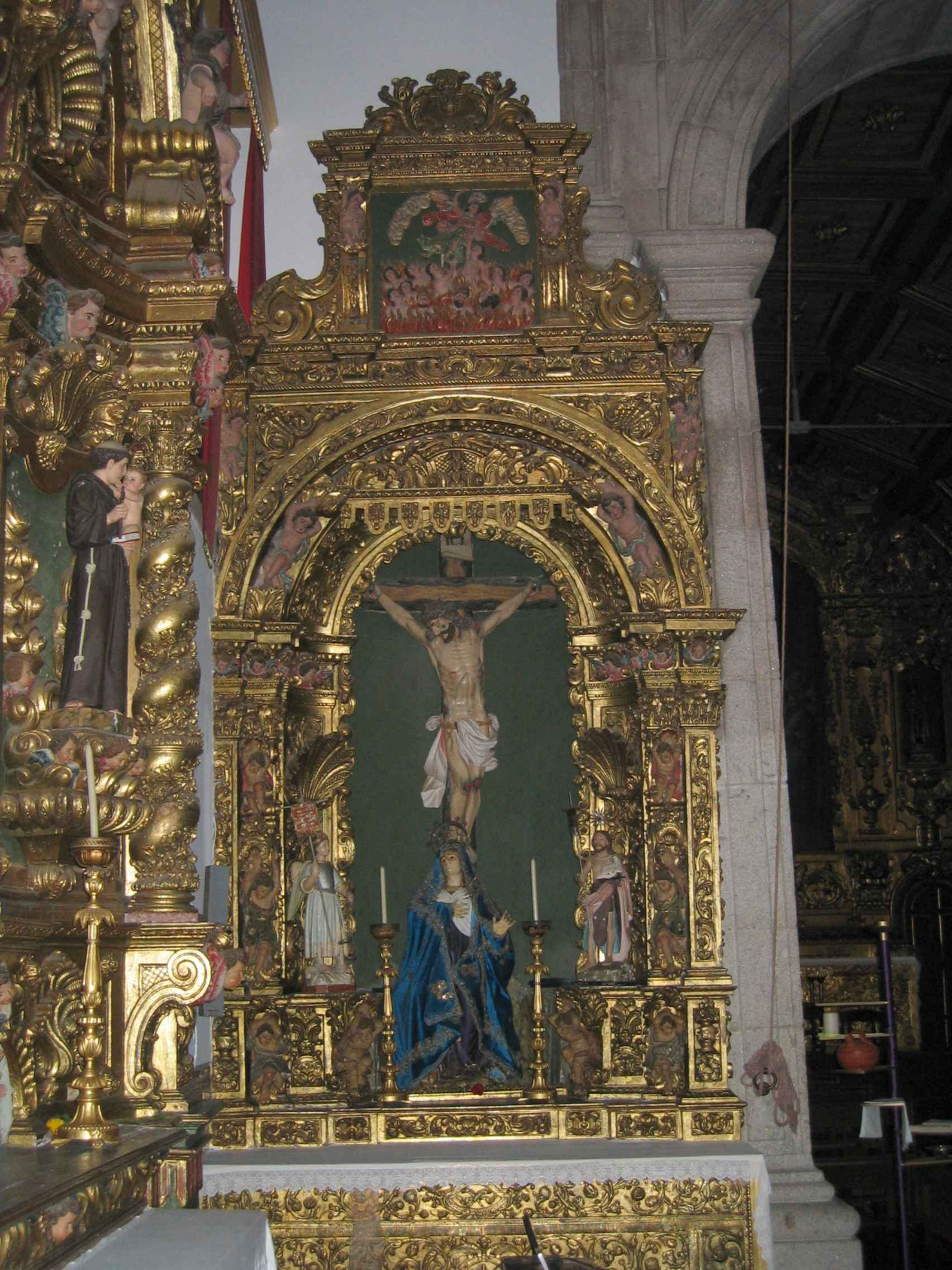
Side altarpiece

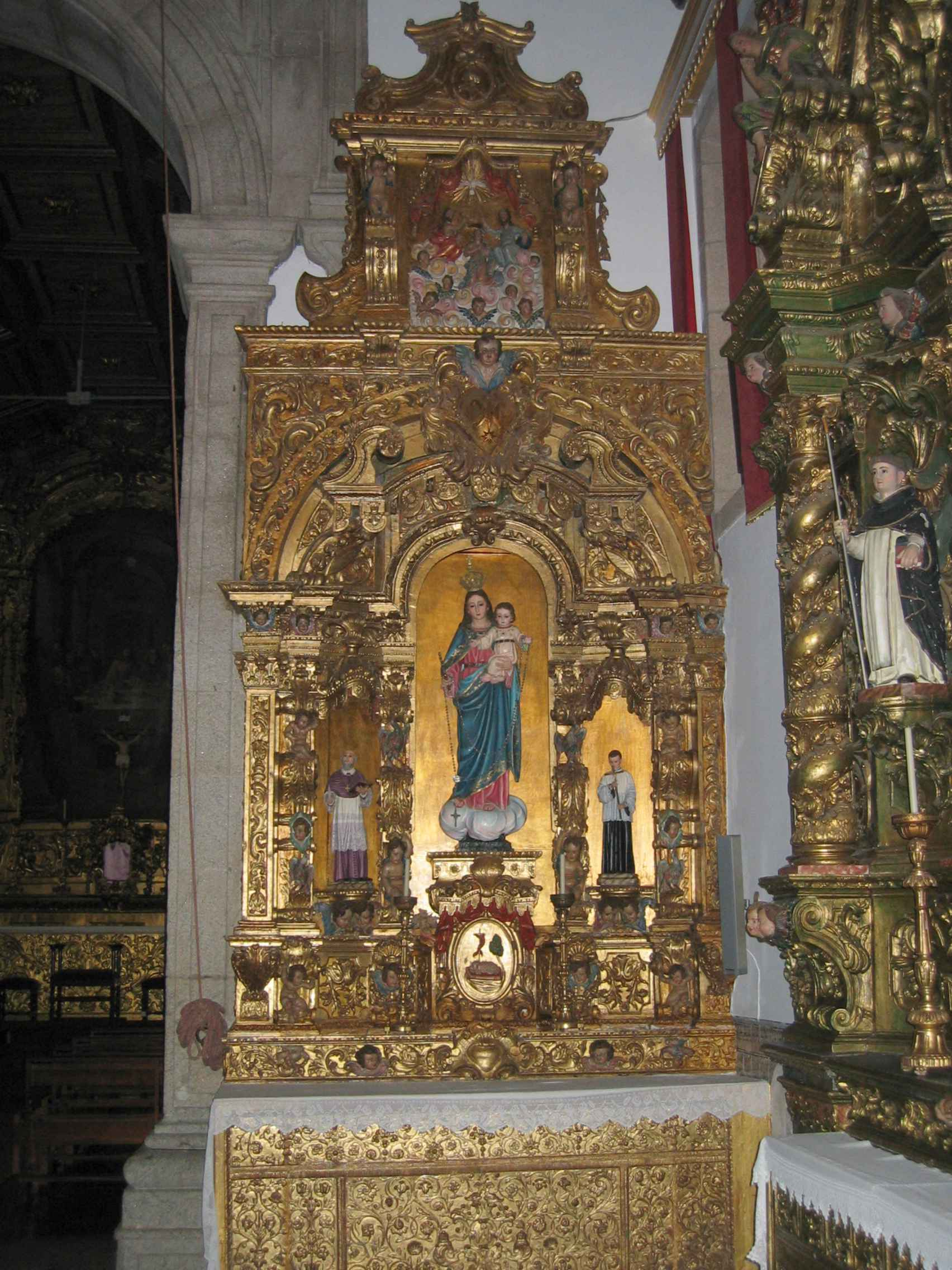
Virgin with child

== Bibliography ==
- Álvaro Duarte de Almeida, Duarte Belo: Portugal – Património. Círculo de Leitores, 2007
