= Fenway Sports Management =

US-based sports marketing firm

- Company type: Private
- Founded: 2004
- Headquarters: Boston, Massachusetts, U.S.
- Key people: Sam Kennedy, CEO; Mark Lev, President
- Parent: Fenway Sports Group
- Divisions: Boston Red Sox; Liverpool F.C. RFK Racing; MLB Advanced Media; NESN; Boston College Athletics; Deutsche Bank Championship
- Subsidiaries: Salem Red Sox

Fenway Sports Management (FSM) is a global sports marketing firm. FSM is headquartered in Boston, Massachusetts, with an office in New York City. Founded in 2004, it is a wholly owned subsidiary of Fenway Sports Group, the parent company of the Boston Red Sox and Liverpool Football Club, among other assets.

== Properties and clients ==
During its first year, FSM entered into an exclusive sponsorship sales agreement with MLB Advanced Media and Boston College's major intercollegiate sports.

Since its inception, FSM has continued to create sponsorship programs and, as of 2014, counted the Red Sox, Liverpool F.C., LeBron James, Roush Fenway Keselowski Racing, MLB.com, the PGA Tour's THE NORTHERN TRUST, NESN, and the Salem Red Sox among its client base. FSM's consulting clients include Dunkin' Donuts, Gulf Oil, JetBlue, and Santander.

In addition, FSM purchased the Salem Avalanche, a minor league baseball franchise in the High Class A Carolina League, in December 2007. On September 19, 2008, FSM announced that the Salem franchise, eventually renamed the Salem Red Sox, would replace the Lancaster JetHawks as Boston's High A affiliate in 2009.

In October 2009, FSG announced a new partnership with Fulham of the English Premiership, with shirt sponsorship to start in 2011.

In April 2011, FSM became the sole marketer of the global rights of NBA superstar LeBron James, in a management partnership deal with James and his manager Maverick Carter. As part of the deal, James and Carter both became minority stake holders in FSG's Liverpool F.C.

In January 2012, FSM negotiated a sponsorship agreement between Liverpool F.C. and Warrior Sports worth £25 million per season as of the 2012/13 season, overtaking the English club record of £23.3 million paid by Nike for supplying Manchester United Football Club and the previous deal from Adidas worth £13 million.

In January 2014, FSM became the marketer of the global rights of 2012 Heisman Trophy winner Johnny Manziel, in a management partnership deal with LRMR Management.

In February 2015, FSM became an investor in the Pawtucket Red Sox of the Triple-A International League, when a new ownership group led by then-Red Sox president/CEO Larry Lucchino (and including two limited partners in Fenway Sports Group) acquired the PawSox from the heirs of late owner Ben Mondor. The PawSox franchise relocated in 2021 and is now the Worcester Red Sox.

== Leadership ==
In October 2009, Sam Kennedy was promoted to succeed Mike Dee (who became chief executive officer of the Miami Dolphins in May 2009) as executive vice president and chief operating officer of the Red Sox, and president of Fenway Sports Management.

On August 1, 2015, Lucchino announced his pending retirement as president/CEO of the Boston Red Sox, with Sam Kennedy promoted to president of the baseball club. Kennedy was signed to a new five-year contract as president and CEO of both the Red Sox and Fenway Sports Management on August 2, 2017. Mark Lev was promoted from managing director to president of FSM on December 10, 2018.
