= Sam Kennedy (baseball executive) =

American baseball executive (born 1973)

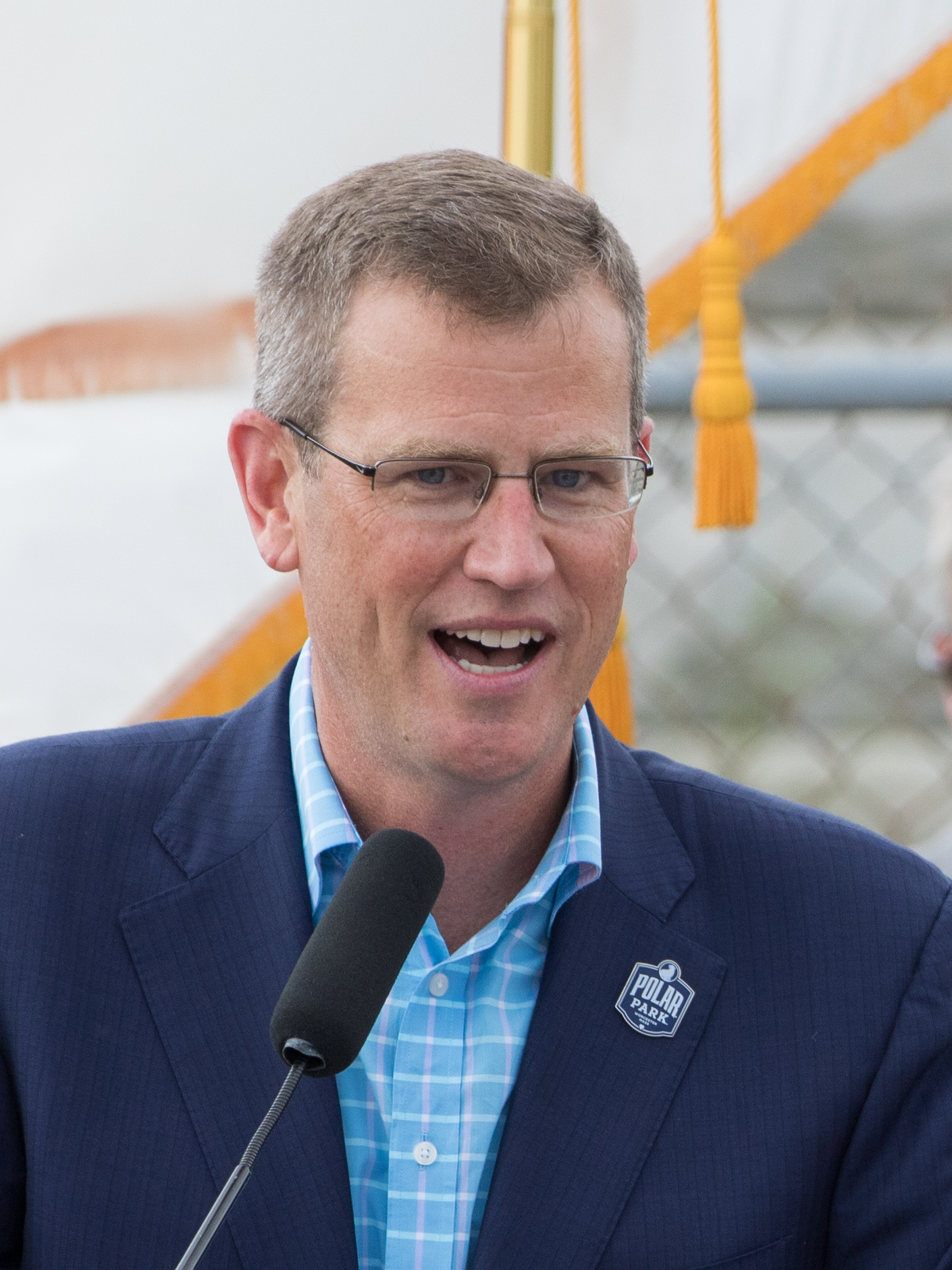
- Kennedy in 2019
- Born: 1973 (age 52–53); Brookline, Massachusetts
- Education: Trinity College
- Occupations: President of the Boston Red Sox (2016–present); CEO of the Boston Red Sox (2017–present); CEO of Fenway Sports Group (2024–present)

Samuel H. Kennedy (born 1973) is an American professional baseball executive who is the president and chief executive officer of the Boston Red Sox of Major League Baseball (MLB) and CEO of Fenway Sports Group (FSG).

He's involved in the Boston community, serving on boards for area healthcare institutions and philanthropic organizations.

== Early life and education ==
The son of an Episcopal priest, Kennedy is a native of Brookline, Massachusetts. He attended Brookline High School and was a classmate of Theo Epstein, later an executive with the Boston Red Sox and Chicago Cubs. At Brookline High School, Kennedy was captain of both the boys' hockey and baseball teams. He then attended Trinity College in Hartford, Connecticut, where he played baseball and earned a bachelor's degree in 1995, and now serves on the school's Board of Fellows.

== Career ==
After an internship with the New York Yankees in 1995, and a period in advertising sales with two major New York City radio stations, WABC and WFAN, Kennedy returned to baseball in 1996 with the San Diego Padres, where he worked under Larry Lucchino and was reunited with Epstein.

Kennedy began his San Diego career as an account executive, and had risen to executive director/corporate accounts and broadcasting when (along with Lucchino and, eventually, Epstein) he joined the Red Sox front office during the 2001–02 offseason upon the team's purchase by Fenway Sports Group (FSG). He rose from vice president/sales and corporate partnerships to senior vice president/sales and marketing to executive vice president/chief marketing officer before becoming the Red Sox' chief operating officer.

Kennedy also worked to enlarge the footprint of parent company FSG. In 2004, working under chief operating officer Mike Dee, he was tasked with the creation of Fenway Sports Management (FSM), a sports marketing agency that operates under the aegis of the Fenway Sports Group, where he served as president following Dee's 2009 departure and subsequently as chief executive officer. In 2010, Kennedy was involved in FSG's purchase of the Premier League association football club Liverpool F.C., with FSM placed in charge of expanding the club's global "commercial operations." Kennedy was considered for top-level positions in sports management outside Boston and baseball, including a possible higher-management role with Maple Leaf Sports and Entertainment in Toronto, prior to the 2015 season.

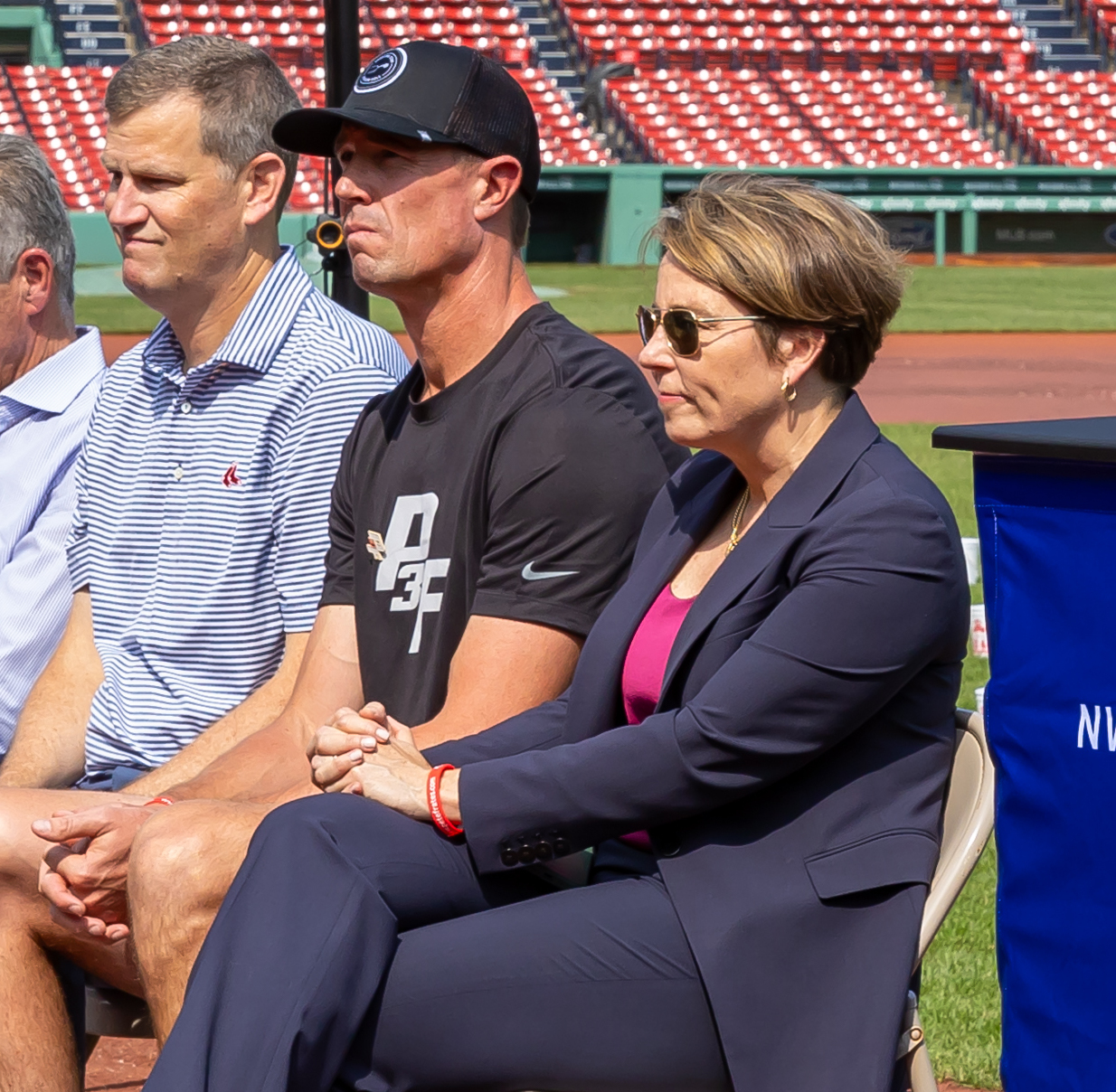
Kennedy sits alongside retired American football player Matt Ryan and Massachusetts governor Maura Healey at a 2024 event at Fenway Park

Kennedy was named the successor to longtime Red Sox president Lucchino on August 1, 2015, when Lucchino announced his decision to retire from his executive positions at the close of the team's 2015 season. Lucchino's CEO post was initially left vacant, and on August 18, 2015, the Red Sox also named veteran MLB executive Dave Dombrowski to the new position of president, baseball operations. On August 2, 2017, the Red Sox and FSM announced Kennedy's appointment as CEO, and signed him to a new five-year contract as both CEO and president. In March 2021, FSG announced that Kennedy had joined its ownership group and become a partner. Three years later, Kennedy was promoted to FSG's chief executive post.

== Personal life ==
Kennedy, his wife Amanda, and their two children reside in Wellesley, Massachusetts.

He is involved in the local Boston community, serving on the Beth Israel Deaconess Medical Center Trustee/Advisory Board and Marketing Committee, Dana Farber’s Visiting Committee for Institute Initiatives, The BASE’s Advisory Committee, and the Board of Directors at Camp Harbor View.

Sporting positions
Preceded by Larry Lucchino	Boston Red Sox President; 2016–present	Succeeded by Incumbent
