= Julian Ward =

English footballer (born 1981)

Personal information
- Full name: Julian Daniel Ward
- Date of birth: 17 June 1981 (age 45)
- Place of birth: Liverpool, England
- Position: Midfielder

Team information
- Current team: Liverpool (sporting director)

Youth career
- Morecambe

Senior career*
Years	Team	Apps	(Gls)
1997–2002	Morecambe		
2002–2003	Hyde United		
2003–2005	Kidsgrove Athletic		
2005–2007	Larne	57	(2)
2007–2008	Lisburn Distillery	28	(3)
- * Club domestic league appearances and goals

Julian Ward (born 17 June 1981) is an English football executive and former footballer who is the current sporting director of Premier League club Liverpool.

== Early life ==
Ward was born on 17 June 1981 in Liverpool, England, but grew up in Cumbria, England. Ward eventually returned to Liverpool to study sports science at Liverpool John Moores University.

== Playing career ==
As a youth player, Ward joined the academy of current EFL League Two side Morecambe, where he started his senior playing career. In 2002, he signed for English side Hyde United. One year later, he signed for English side Kidsgrove Athletic. In 2005, Ward moved to Belfast and signed for Northern Irish Premier League side Larne Football Club managed by Kenny Shiels. Ward spent two seasons with Larne Football Club before signing for Paul Kirk’s Northern Irish Premier League side Lisburn Distillery in 2007.

== Managerial career ==
In July 2008 Ward left Northern Ireland to become part of Carlos Queiroz’s technical team, when he was appointed Head of Technical Scouting for the Portugal national football team. During his time with the Portugal national football team, he lived in Lisbon and learnt Portuguese. After the 2010 FIFA World Cup Finals in South Africa, Carlos Queiroz was replaced by Paulo Bento and Ward returned to England, accepting a position within the scouting department of English Premier League side Manchester City.

In September 2012, following Manchester City’s first Premier League title, Ward left the Champions to take the role of European scouting manager and later loan player manager for English Premier League side Liverpool Football Club. By 2020, after establishing the club's loan player department, he was promoted to assistant sporting director, working alongside Michael Edwards for two seasons. Upon promotion to Liverpool FC's sporting director in 2022, Ward led on the signings of a number of players, including Colombian international Luis Díaz, Uruguayan forward Darwin Núñez, Dutch winger Cody Gakpo and Argentina’s 2022 FIFA World Cup winner Alexis Mac Allister.

Ward was heavily linked with Sporting Director roles at Ajax and Manchester United but returned to Liverpool Football Club in May 2024 as technical director for its owners Fenway Sports Group.

On September 26th 2026, Julian Ward was appointed as Liverpool FC's Sporting Director, succeeding the departing Richard Hughes who resigned to take up a position with Al Hilal SFC.
