= Pedro Marques (football manager) =

Portuguese football manager (born 1982)

Personal information
- Full name: Pedro Miguel Dias Marques
- Date of birth: 21 July 1982 (age 43)
- Place of birth: Lisbon, Portugal

Pedro Miguel Dias Marques (Portuguese pronunciation: [pˈedɹʊ mˈaɾəkɨʃ]; born 21 July 1982) is a Portuguese football manager who is the director of football development of Liverpool.

== Early life ==
Marques was born on 21 July 1982 in Lisbon, Portugal. Growing up, he played tennis and studied in Brazil and Portugal.

== Career ==
In 2004, Marques was appointed as a youth manager for Portuguese side Sporting. Following his stint there, he was appointed as an analyst for Premier League side Manchester City and also worked for the City Football Group. Subsequently, he was appointed youth technical director of Portuguese side Benfica, where he helped the club sign Argentina international Enzo Fernández. Six years later, he was appointed director of football development of Premier League side Liverpool.
