= U.S. Open Pickleball Championships =

Annual pickleball tournament

The Franklin U.S. Open Pickleball Championships is an annual pickleball tournament that has been held since 2016 at the East Naples Community Park in Naples, Florida. The tournament is open to amateur, professional and international players. The 2024 event, which ran from April 13th to the 20th, had over 3,250 competitors, and over 50,000 spectators. To date, this was the largest pickleball event in the world.

The championships consist of five professional and five senior professional events: men's and women's singles, men's and women's doubles, and mixed doubles, along with three mixed age doubles events. Non-professional players compete in the same five events, but are further categorized by age and skill level, with participants chosen through a lottery system.

== History ==
The U.S. Open Pickleball Championships were founded by Terri Graham and Chris Evon through their sports development firm, Spirit Promotions. The first event, and every one since, was held in 2016 at the Naples Pickleball Center in the East Naples Community Park in Naples, Florida. There were close to 800 participants and 2,000 spectators.

Businessman Mike Dee formed Pickleball 4 America (Pickle4) in 2023. Spirit Promotions then merged with Pickle4 as a subsidiary. In 2024 Pickle4 secured a long-term lease for the Naples Pickleball Center and rebranded the Center as the USOP National Pickleball Center (USOP NPC).

Since the tournament's inception, portions of it have been televised by CBS Sports Network, typically on tape delay. The men's and women's doubles championships have been broadcast live by the network for both the 2021 and 2022 editions. The event's current sponsors include Minto and Margaritaville.

Due to the popularity of the event, Naples is often referred to as "pickleball capital of the country". Recognizing the importance of pickleball to the Naples area, in 2022 Collier County, Florida provided a $670,000 grant to the region's pickleball industry.
