= 43 Years with the Same Bird =

2008 book by Brian Reade

43 years with the Same Bird
- Author: Brian Reade
- Language: English
- Subject: Sport/Biography
- Publisher: Macmillan
- Publication date: 4 Jul 2008
- Publication place: United Kingdom
- Pages: 256
- ISBN: 978-0-230-70968-3

43 years with the Same Bird is a 2008 book written by Daily Mirror columnist Brian Reade. It documents his lifelong following of Liverpool F.C.

The book tells the story of Brian's love affair with Liverpool FC along with the relationship he had with his brother and other family members. It also details the start of his journalistic career and explains how he dealt with the joys and tragic events that accompanied being a Liverpool fan in the 1980s.

In brief reviews, the Mirror called it a "brilliantly incisive and profoundly entertaining analysis" and Wales on Sunday praised its "wonderful insight, written in a measured yet endearing way." The Liverpool Echo's Paddy Shennan described Reade as one of Britain's "sharpest and funniest writers" and praised Reade's treatment of the Hillsborough disaster.
