= Brian Reade =

British journalist and author

- Born: Brian Reade; 20 November 1957 (age 68); Liverpool, England
- Occupation: Journalist
- Children: 3

Brian Reade is a British journalist and author who writes a weekly opinion column for the Daily Mirror. He was born in Wavertree and grew up in Huyton.

== Life and career ==
He began his journalism career working on the Reading Evening Post in 1980 and became a columnist on the Liverpool Echo in 1990 before moving to the Mirror in 1994.

In 2007, a column in the Daily Mirror by Reade which likened Lord Green and his organisation MigrationWatch UK to the Ku Klux Klan and the Nazi Party led to Green successfully suing for costs and damages.

In 2023, Sir James Dyson lost a libel claim against the Daily Mirror over an article in which Reade called him "the vacuum-cleaner tycoon who championed Vote Leave due to the economic opportunities it would bring to British industry before moving his global head office to Singapore."

In 2008, Reade became a presenter on radio station City Talk 105.9 and released his first book, entitled 43 Years with the Same Bird, documenting his life spent following Liverpool F.C.

In 2011, he released a book investigating corruption in football, An Epic Swindle. In 2021 Reade wrote a third book Diamonds In The Mud about working-class heroes. In 2024 he penned his debut novel Sick Mick.

== Awards ==
- 2000: The British Press Awards Columnist of the Year
- 2003: The Sports Journalists' Association Columnist of the Year
- 2012: The British Press Awards Cudlipp Award for Journalistic Excellence (following his two-decade fight for justice for the victims of the Hillsborough disaster.)
- 2014: The British Press Awards Highly Commended Columnist of the Year
- 2017: Society of Editors National Press Awards Feature Writer of the Year
