= Michael Edwards (football executive) =

English association football director

Michael Edwards OBE
Personal information
- Full name: Michael Edwards
- Date of birth: 21 June 1979 (age 47)
- Place of birth: Southampton, Hampshire, England

Youth career
- Years: Team
- –1997: Peterborough United

Managerial career
- 2003–2009: Portsmouth (Head of Performance Analysis)
- 2009–2011: Tottenham Hotspur (Head of Performance Analysis)
- 2011–2013: Liverpool (Head of Performance & Analysis)
- 2013–2015: Liverpool (Head of Methodology)
- 2015–2016: Liverpool (Technical Director)
- 2016–2022: Liverpool (Sporting Director)
- 2024–2026: Fenway Sports Group (CEO of Football)

Michael Edwards is an English football executive who is most known for his tenure as sporting director of Premier League club Liverpool FC.

He was most recently Chief Executive of Football for Fenway Sports Group, majority investors in Liverpool.

== Early life ==
Edwards was a youth and reserve-team footballer at Peterborough United before being released at the age of 18.

He graduated with an undergraduate degree in informatics from the University of Sheffield and trained to be a teacher, initially working at a local high school.

== Career ==
=== Early career ===
Edwards' first move into football was with Portsmouth as an analyst using data from the company Prozone.

As the department expanded, Edwards was promoted to Head of Performance Analysis. During his time at the club, he developed a strong relationship with then manager Harry Redknapp.

Redknapp departed Portsmouth for Tottenham Hotspur in October 2008. One year later, Edwards followed him and joined to fulfil a similar role. He spent two years at the club until he was convinced to join Liverpool, with then Director of Football Damien Comolli being instrumental in his recruitment.

=== Liverpool FC ===
==== First Period ====
Edwards initially joined the club as Head of Performance and Analysis. He was tasked with reviewing how football was analysed at the club and instigated a restructuring both at Melwood and the Academy. He managed first team analysis operations for first team managers Kenny Dalglish and Brendan Rodgers. During the latter's tenure, Edwards was part of the "Transfer Committee" which was established at the club due to Rodgers' refusal to work with a sporting director.

Edwards was promoted to Technical Director in August 2015; two months later, Rodgers was sacked after managing the team to just one win in their previous nine games. Edwards was responsible for identifying the most suitable candidate to take over the managerial position, which eventually led to a three-man shortlist of Eddie Howe, Carlo Ancelotti and Jürgen Klopp. Edwards recommended Klöpp to the board of Fenway Sports Group, the owners of the club, who completed the hiring shortly after.

In 2016, Edwards was promoted to sporting director and was instrumental in rebuilding the Liverpool squad that went on to win multiple trophies, including the club's first Premier League title in 2019-20.

In October 2022, after 11 years at the club, Edwards left Liverpool. He then spent a period of time out-of-work before beginning to work as a consultant with Ludonautics, a sports advisory business focused on statistical analysis founded by Ian Graham, previously Director of Research at Liverpool.

==== Second Period ====
In June 2024, Edwards was rehired by the club's owners Fenway Sports Group in 2024 as their CEO of Football, overseeing all football operations at the club but with a particular remit to identify potential investment opportunities to create a multi-club ownership group.

Around this time, the club appointed Richard Hughes as sporting director. The two previously knew each other as Hughes signed as a player for Portsmouth during Edwards' time at the club. Arne Slot was hired as manager ahead of the 2024–25 season in which the club went on to win its second Premier League title.

Edwards spent considerable time in this period analysing around 25 football clubs that Fenway Sports Group could potentially invest in. These reportedly included AS Monaco, Bordeaux, Getafe CF and Málaga CF. However, as the ownership group decided it would not pursue a multi-club strategy, Edwards stepped down from his role in July 2026.

== Personal life ==
Edwards is a native of Southampton, England.

== Honours ==
- Premier League: 2019–20, 2024–25
- FA Cup: 2021–22
- EFL Cup: 2021–22, runner-up: 2024–25
- FA Community Shield: 2022
- UEFA Champions League: 2018–19; runner-up: 2017–18, 2021–22
- UEFA Europa League runner-up: 2015–16
- UEFA Super Cup: 2019
- FIFA Club World Cup: 2019
