= Mike Dee =

American sports and media executive

Mike Dee (business executive)
- Occupation: Business executive
- Known for: President of Deutsch Family Wine & Spirits; Chairman of Pickleball 4 America; President of Sports for Audacy, Inc.; CEO of the San Diego Padres; CEO of the Miami Dolphins; COO of the Boston Red Sox

Mike Dee is an American business executive. He is president of Deutsch Family Wine & Spirits. Dee is also the co-founder and chairman of Pickleball 4 America, the organization that owns the U.S. Open Pickleball Championships.

Dee has held executive leadership roles with some of the biggest brands in professional sports, including as CEO and president of the San Diego Padres, CEO of the Miami Dolphins and Hard Rock Stadium, and COO of the Boston Red Sox.

== Early life and education ==
A native of Baltimore, Maryland, Dee was an avid sports fan growing up, following the Baltimore Orioles, Baltimore Colts, Washington Bullets (now Wizards), and University of Maryland basketball. He attended The John Carroll School in Bel Air, MD. He then attended Franklin and Marshall College (F&M) in Lancaster, Pennsylvania, earning a degree in Government while playing collegiate basketball. Dee is a member of Sigma Pi fraternity and remains active in philanthropic initiatives. He previously was chairman of the Pan-Mass Challenge, where he helped raise over $1 billion for cancer research.

== Executive career ==
=== San Diego Padres (1995–2002) ===
Dee began his career with the San Diego Padres in 1995 as Director of Corporate Development, later becoming Senior Vice President of Business Affairs under Larry Lucchino. He played a key role in the financial planning and construction of Petco Park, positioning it as a major economic driver for San Diego. Dee also led the creation of Channel 4 Padres, a regional sports network in partnership with Cox Communications, which became a significant media revenue stream for the franchise.

=== Boston Red Sox & Fenway Sports Group (2002–2009) ===
When Lucchino joined the John W. Henry and Tom Werner-led ownership group to acquire the Boston Red Sox, Dee followed as part of the new leadership team. As chief operating officer (COO), Dee helped transform the Red Sox into a financial powerhouse, setting franchise revenue and attendance records for seven consecutive years.

During his tenure, he oversaw:

- Two World Series titles (2004, 2007), breaking the Red Sox’s 86-year championship drought.
- The longest sellout streak in MLB history, significantly increasing ticket and sponsorship revenue.
- A $78 million, 30-year partnership with Lee County, Florida, to build JetBlue Park, securing the Red Sox’s spring training home.
- Expansion of the Red Sox brand globally, including international partnerships and digital media rights.

As president of Fenway Sports Group (FSG), Dee played a key role in diversifying the Red Sox’s business interests beyond baseball. He led the acquisition of a 50% stake in Roush Fenway Racing, helping Matt Kenseth win the Daytona 500 in 2009. Dee also spearheaded a landmark 10-year radio partnership with Entercom Communications, laying the foundation for his later media ventures.

=== Miami Dolphins & Hard Rock Stadium (2009–2013) ===
In 2009, Dee was appointed CEO of the Miami Dolphins and Sun Life Stadium (now Hard Rock Stadium) by owner Stephen M. Ross. His leadership redefined the Dolphins' business operations, including:

- A lucrative stadium naming-rights deal with Sun Life Financial, making the venue a hub for major events like Super Bowl XLIV, the BCS National Championship, and WrestleMania XXVIII.
- A proposed stadium renovation plan, backed by the Florida Senate, though ultimately blocked in the House.
- Strengthening the team’s community engagement and alumni relations, including creating the Dolphins Cancer Challenge, now the NFL's largest philanthropic event.

=== San Diego Padres (2013–2016) ===
Dee returned to the San Diego Padres as CEO and president in 2013, tasked with revitalizing the organization. Under his leadership, the team saw significant revenue growth, thanks to:

- A multi-year, $50M+ renovation of Petco Park, which earned recognition as MLB’s top ballpark.
- Winning the bid to host the 2016 MLB All-Star Game,
- Overhauling baseball operations by hiring A.J. Preller as GM, leading to a major rebuilding effort, securing future stars like Fernando Tatis, Jr.
- A record $90M investment in international player acquisitions.

Dee departed the Padres in 2016 as the franchise's long-term rebuild gained momentum, laying the foundation for the team’s resurgence in the 2020s.

=== Audacy, Inc. (2017–2023) ===
In 2017, Dee transitioned into media, joining Audacy (formerly Entercom Communications) as president of Sports. Overseeing 40+ professional and collegiate play-by-play partnerships, he played a key role in scaling Audacy’s sports media business. His leadership included:

- Launching RADIO.COM Sports, an integrated digital audio platform.
- Expanding sports betting partnerships, securing record-setting 9 figure, long term ad deals with FanDuel and BetMGM. As part of this movement, he created the show You Better You Bet, hiring an unknown talent at the time, Nick Kostos to lead the show. YBYB has now become one of the biggest sports betting franchises in sports audio with Kostos now widely regarded as the top sports betting personality in audio.
- Leading the acquisition of QL Gaming Group, enhancing Audacy’s data-driven sports betting capabilities.

=== Pickleball 4 America (2023–2024) ===
After leaving Audacy, Dee co-founded Pickleball 4 America, as CEO and leading the acquisition of the U.S. Open Pickleball Championships. Under his leadership:

- Pickleball 4 America merged with Spirit Promotions, solidifying its position in the sport.
- He secured a long term agreement with Collier County, FL creating the USOP National Pickleball Center, the largest and busiest pickleball facility in the world.
- The US Open Pickleball Championships expanded, reinforcing its status as one of the sport’s premier global events.

=== Deutsch Family Wine & Spirits (2024–present) ===
In January 2025, Dee was named president of Deutsch Family Wine & Spirits, overseeing the company's continued expansion, including Josh Cellars, Yellowtail, The Calling, Redemption Whiskey, Gray Whale Gin and Cantera Negra Tequila.

== Personal ==
Dee has been a supporter of cancer research, and chairman of the Pan-Mass Challenge, which has raised over $1 billion.
