= Fenway Sports Group =

American sports company

- Type: Private
- Industry: Sports investment
- Founded: 2001 in Delaware, U.S.
- Founders: John W. Henry; Tom Werner
- Headquarters: Boston, Massachusetts, U.S.
- Key people: Tom Werner (Chairman)
- Divisions: Fenway Sports Management
- Subsidiaries: Boston Red Sox; Fenway Park; Fenway South; Liverpool Football Club (62%); RFK Racing (50%); Boston Common Golf; Worcester Red Sox (10%); Fenway Sports Management; Fenway Sports Group Real Estate; Fenway Music Company; New England Sports Network (80%)
- Website: fenwaysportsgroup.com

Fenway Sports Group Holdings, LLC (FSG), is an American multinational sports holding conglomerate which owns Major League Baseball's Boston Red Sox, Premier League's Liverpool, NASCAR's RFK Racing, and TGL's Boston Common Golf.

FSG was founded in 2001 as New England Sports Ventures (NESV) when John W. Henry joined forces with Tom Werner, Les Otten, the New York Times Company and other investors to successfully bid for the Red Sox. NESV formally announced its name change to Fenway Sports Group in March 2011.

In addition to owning the Red Sox and Liverpool FC, the Boston-based limited liability company also owns the home stadiums for both the Red Sox (Fenway Park) and Liverpool (Anfield), as well as Fenway Sports Management, and 80% of the New England Sports Network (NESN).

== History ==
New England Sports Ventures, LLC, was formed in accordance with Delaware State Law in 2001. The company registered to do business in Massachusetts in the same year.

== Business interests ==
=== Boston Red Sox ===
The Boston Red Sox are a professional baseball team based in Boston, Massachusetts and a member of the Major League Baseball’s American League Eastern Division. Founded in 1901 as one of the American League's eight charter franchises, the Red Sox's home ballpark has been Fenway Park since 1912. The "Red Sox" name was chosen by the team owner, John I. Taylor, around 1908, following previous Boston teams that had been known as the "Red Stockings." Boston was a dominant team in the new league, defeating the Pittsburgh Pirates in the first World Series in 1903 and winning four more championships by 1918.

In 2002, the Red Sox were sold by the Yawkey Trust to Fenway Sports Group. They had endured one of the longest championship droughts in baseball history, called by some the "Curse of the Bambino" after its alleged beginning with the Red Sox's sale of Babe Ruth to the rival Yankees in 1919, an 86-year wait before the team's sixth World Championship in 2004. Red Sox history has also been marked by the team's intense rivalry with the New York Yankees, arguably the fiercest and most historic in North American professional sports. Since 2003, the Red Sox have been perennial playoff contenders and have won four World Series, emerging as one of the most successful major league baseball teams of the 21st century. Ownership has recently taken more interest in outside ventures as the Red Sox payroll is now among the middle of the league.

==== Fenway Park ====
Fenway Park is a baseball park near Kenmore Square in Boston, Massachusetts. Located at 4 Jersey Street, it has served as the home ballpark of the Boston Red Sox baseball club since it opened in 1912 and is the oldest Major League Baseball stadium currently in use. It is, along with Chicago's Wrigley Field, one of the pair of the original "jewel box" standard ballparks that are still in use. Considered to be one of the best-known sports venues in the U.S., Fenway Park became the oldest venue used by a professional sports team in the United States in 1999 when the Detroit Tigers moved out of Tiger Stadium, which opened the same day as Fenway Park.

==== Fenway South ====
Fenway South is the spring training base of the Boston Red Sox in Fort Myers, Florida. The purpose-built training and player development complex is used year-round by the Red Sox and its minor league farm teams—Worcester Red Sox, Portland Sea Dogs, Greenville Drive, and Salem Red Sox—and includes an 11,000-seat stadium and an additional six baseball fields together with training and medical facilities. As the spring training home of Red Sox, it replaced the nearby City of Palms Park. The stadium within Fenway South is called JetBlue Park, through sponsorship by JetBlue, which has maintained major operations at Boston's Logan International Airport since 2004.

=== Liverpool ===
Having previously partnered with the English club Fulham, on October 6, 2010, FSG agreed to buy Liverpool from owners George N. Gillett, Jr. and Tom Hicks, after the board voted 3–2 to oust them from the club. It purchased through a subsidiary, "N.E.S.V. I, LLC" (incorporated in Delaware) and UK based holding company "UKSV Holdings Company Limited." Liverpool won the 2018–19 UEFA Champions League, having finished runners-up in the previous year's competition. They also won the 2019–20 Premier League and the 2024–25 Premier League.

In 2019, FSG was criticized for a failed attempt by Liverpool to trademark the name "Liverpool". The supporters' group Spirit of Shankly (SOS) campaigned against the move. When the Intellectual Property Office refused the application because of the "geographical significance" of the name, a spokesman for SOS underlined that the name "belongs to the city of Liverpool and its people."

In 2021, FSG was embroiled in a controversy over its attempts, along with the owners of a few other soccer clubs, to create a European Super League. In doing so, FSG wanted to copy the NFL franchise model, creating a league without relegation and promotion, and ending the existing league pyramid system. Whilst widely reported, the suggestion of removing the involved clubs from the domestic competition and its associated pyramid were false. The proposed league would take the place of UEFA competitions in the soccer calendar following a similar format of midweek fixtures followed by knockout rounds, albeit with a selective membership. The league ultimately collapsed following public outcry and criticism from media outlets, with senior figures from clubs including John Henry making public apologies to fans.

In late 2022, FSG expressed its eagerness to consider new shareholders following the reports that the club was up for sale.

==== Anfield ====
Anfield is a football stadium in the city of Liverpool, England. Built in 1884 and originally the home of Everton, the stadium has been home to Liverpool since it was formed in 1892. FSG purchased Anfield along with Liverpool in October 2010. The stadium has undergone several expansion projects since.

=== Pittsburgh Penguins ===
On November 29, 2021, FSG announced its intent to purchase a controlling stake in the Pittsburgh Penguins of the National Hockey League. On December 31, 2021, they officially took over as majority owners of the Penguins, and on April 13, 2022, it was announced that the Penguins would play the Boston Bruins in the NHL Winter Classic at Fenway Park on January 2, 2023. On December 18, 2025, it was announced David Hoffman and his family would buy the franchise.

=== Roush Fenway Keselowski Racing ===
Roush Fenway Keselowski Racing (formerly Roush Racing and Roush Fenway Racing) is a racing team competing in NASCAR racing. As one of NASCAR's largest premier racing teams, Roush runs the No. 6 (currently driven by Team's Co-owner Brad Keselowski), the No. 17 (currently driven by Chris Buescher), and the No. 60 (currently driven by Ryan Preece) Ford Mustangs in the NASCAR Cup Series and previously competed in the Xfinity Series (1992–2018), NASCAR Craftsman Truck Series (1996–2009) and ARCA RE/MAX Series.

Roush first entered NASCAR competition in 1988 but had competed and won championships in various drag racing and sports car racing series since the mid-1960s. The racing business was originally a small branch of co-owner Jack Roush's successful automotive engineering and road-racing equipment business based in Livonia, Michigan.

On February 14, 2007, FSG purchased 50% of Roush Racing to create a new corporate entity, Roush Fenway Racing.

=== Boston Common Golf ===
On June 26, 2023, it was announced that FSG would own one of six teams in the TMRW Golf League, a high-tech golf league created by Tiger Woods and Rory McIlroy. The team will represent Boston and the greater New England area.

=== Salem RidgeYaks ===
In December 2007, Fenway Sports Group agreed to purchase the Salem Avalanche of the Carolina League, Single A Advanced affiliate of the Houston Astros with the anticipation of converting the team to a Boston-affiliated club. The team was purchased from Atlanta-based Hardball Capital led by Jason Freier. In 2009, the Salem, Virginia-based team adopted the Red Sox moniker, including a logo and color scheme to match their parent club. Since Fenway acquired the club, it has had a relative amount of success, claiming one league title, two division titles, and making three playoff appearances. In late 2025, the team changed its name from the Salem Red Sox to the Salem RidgeYaks.

=== Fenway Sports Management ===
Fenway Sports Management (FSM) was established by FSG in 2004. It styles itself as a "new kind of sports marketing agency", created by FSG to expand its footprint beyond its most famous holdings, the Boston Red Sox of Major League Baseball and Fenway Park. FSM entered into an exclusive sponsorship sales agreement with MLB Advanced Media and Boston College's major intercollegiate sports in 2004 and as of 2014 counts the Red Sox, Liverpool, LeBron James, Johnny Manziel, BC, Roush Fenway Racing, MLB.com, the PGA Tour's Deutsche Bank Championship, NESN, the Worcester Red Sox and the Salem Red Sox among its client base.

=== NESN ===
The New England Sports Network (NESN) is a regional cable television network that covers the six New England states except Fairfield County, Connecticut and Southbury, Connecticut, a town in New Haven County that is covered by New York City sports networks. FSG is NESN's majority owner (80%) and the Boston Bruins own the remaining 20%. Although it mainly broadcasts non-national Boston Red Sox and Boston Bruins games, NESN also features minor league baseball, regional college sports including college hockey games on Friday nights, various outdoor shows, and sports talk shows featuring the sports columnists of The Boston Globe, as that paper is also owned by John Henry.

=== SportsNet Pittsburgh ===
On August 31, 2023, Fenway Sports Group announced they would be purchasing AT&T SportsNet Pittsburgh on October 2, 2023, and rebranding it to SportsNet Pittsburgh. The move came after AT&T Sportsnet Pittsburgh parent company Warner Bros. Discovery Sports announced they were leaving the regional sports network business.

== Partners ==
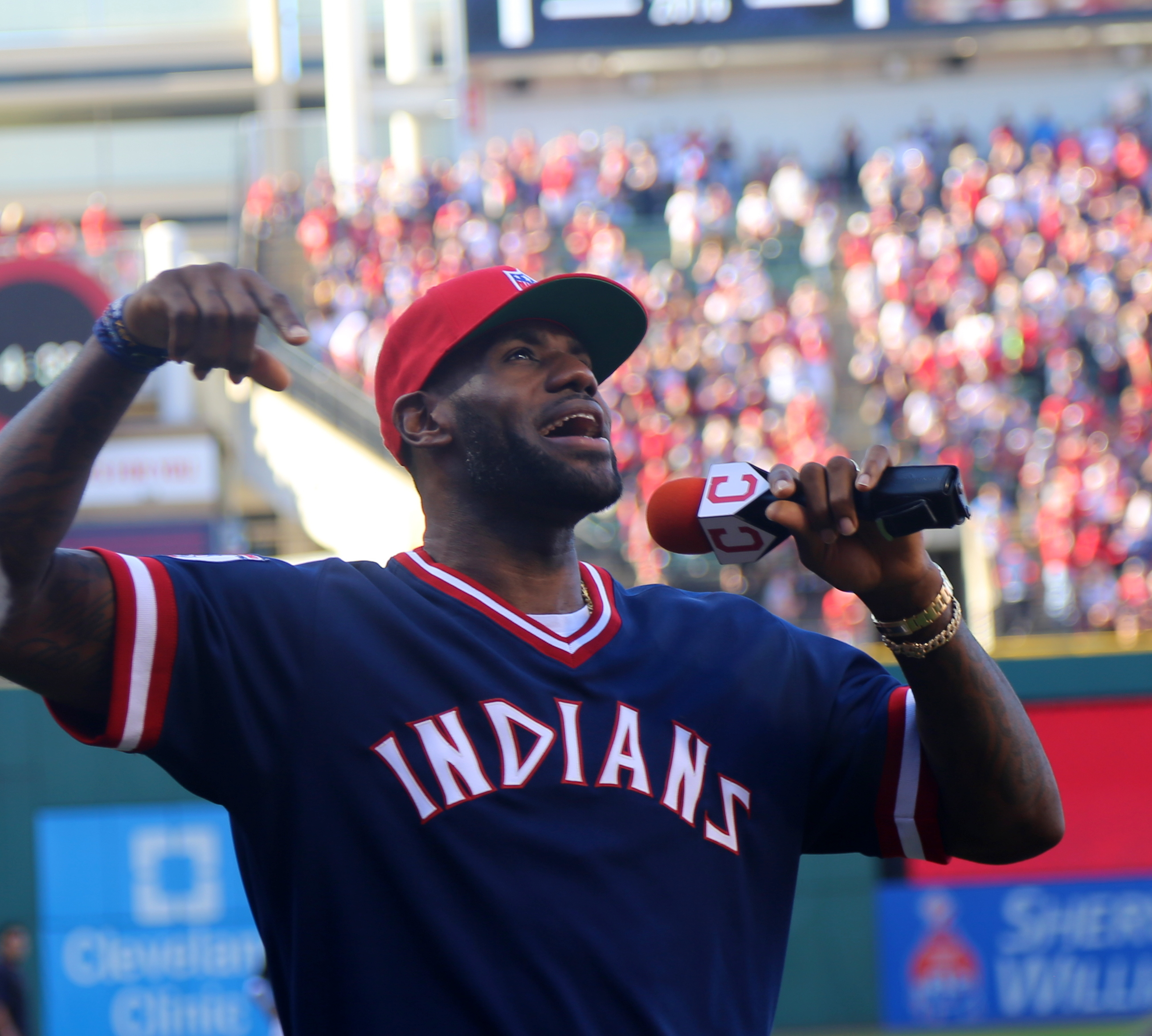
LeBron James

John W. Henry is the principal owner, holding an estimated 40 percent of the stock in FSG. Chairman Tom Werner controls the second-largest block of shares. The Boston Globe (owned by Henry) reported in March 2021 that RedBird Capital Partners, a New York private investment firm, had acquired a $750 million stake in Fenway Sports Group to become its third-largest partner, with Boston-based asset manager Michael S. Gordon, president of FSG, holding the fourth-largest share. On March 31, 2021, FSG officially announced that NBA star LeBron James and his longtime business partners, Maverick Carter and Paul Wachter—along with Boston Red Sox CEO Sam Kennedy—had also acquired partnerships in FSG.

Partners in Fenway Sports Group LLC as of 2025 include:

- Theodore Alfond
- William Alfond
- Arctos Partners
- Maverick Carter
- Thomas R. DiBenedetto
- Michael J. Egan (Director, Liverpool)
- Patrick Egan
- Theo Epstein (Senior adviser)
- Chris Fillo
- David Ginsberg (Vice chairman)
- Michael S. Gordon (President, FSG; director, Liverpool)
- John W. Henry (Principal owner)
- Linda P. Henry
- Jimmy Iovine
- Mitchell Jacobson
- LeBron James
- Gary Kaneb
- Sam Kennedy (CEO, FSG; president/CEO, Boston Red Sox)
- Seth Klarman
- Main Street Advisors
- Henry F. McCance
- Phillip H. Morse (Vice chairman)
- Michael Pucker
- Bruce Rauner
- RedBird Capital Partners
- Frank M. Resnek
- Steve Somers
- Laura Trust
- Paul Wachter
- Herbert Wagner
- Richard W. Warke
- Teddy Werner
- Thomas C. Werner (Chairman)

Billy Hogan is listed as CEO of FSG International, Julie Swinehart as chief financial officer, and Ed Weiss as executive vice president/corporate strategy and general counsel.

Fenway Sports Group appointed former Liverpool Football Club sporting director Michael Edwards as the chief executive of football in March 2024.
