= Liverpool F.C. =

Association football club in England

Liverpool
- Full name: Liverpool Football Club
- Nickname: The Reds
- Founded: 3 June 1892; 134 years ago
- Ground: Anfield
- Capacity: 61,276
- Owner(s): Fenway Sports Group (62%); 1892 Holdings (38%)
- Chairman: Tom Werner
- Head coach: Andoni Iraola
- League: Premier League
- 2025–26: Premier League, 5th of 20
- Website: liverpoolfc.com
Home colours	Away colours	Third colours

Liverpool Football Club is a professional football club based in Liverpool, Merseyside, England. The club competes in the Premier League, the top tier of English football. Founded in 1892, the club joined the Football League the following year and has played its home games at Anfield since its formation. Liverpool is one of the most valuable and widely supported clubs in the world.

Domestically, the club has won a joint-record twenty league titles, eight FA Cups, a record ten League Cups and sixteen FA Community Shields. In international competitions, the club has won six European Cups, three UEFA Cups, four UEFA Super Cups—all English records—and one FIFA Club World Cup. Liverpool established itself as a major force in domestic football in the 1960s under Bill Shankly, before becoming perennial title challengers at home and abroad under Bob Paisley, Joe Fagan and Kenny Dalglish who led the club to a combined eleven league titles and four European Cups through the 1970s and 80s. Liverpool won two further European Cups in 2005 and 2019 under the management of Rafael Benítez and Jürgen Klopp, respectively; the latter led Liverpool to a nineteenth league title in 2020, the club's first during the Premier League era. Following Klopp's departure in 2024, Arne Slot guided Liverpool to a twentieth league title in 2025.

Already nicknamed the Reds, it was under Shankly that the team first adopted the distinctive all-red home strip which has been used ever since. Also adopted under Shankly's tenure was the club's anthem "You'll Never Walk Alone". The Reds compete in the local Merseyside derby against Everton, often referred as the Blues. As the two most decorated clubs in England, and inter-city rivals, Liverpool also has a long-standing rivalry with Manchester United.

The club's supporters have been involved in two major tragedies. At the 1985 European Cup final in Brussels, the Heysel Stadium disaster saw 39 fans – mainly Italian supporters of opponents Juventus – die after they were crushed between onrushing Liverpool fans and a concrete wall that subsequently collapsed. As a result of persistent hooliganism, English teams were banned from European club competitions initially indefinitely, but ultimately for five years, and Liverpool for an additional year. In 1989, the Hillsborough disaster claimed the lives of 97 Liverpool supporters after grossly negligent policing led to a crowd crush; the disaster led to the elimination of fenced standing terraces in favour of all-seater stadiums in the top two tiers of English football. A decades-long campaign for justice in the case of Hillsborough saw further coroner's inquests, commissions and independent panels that ultimately exonerated the fans of all blame.

== History ==
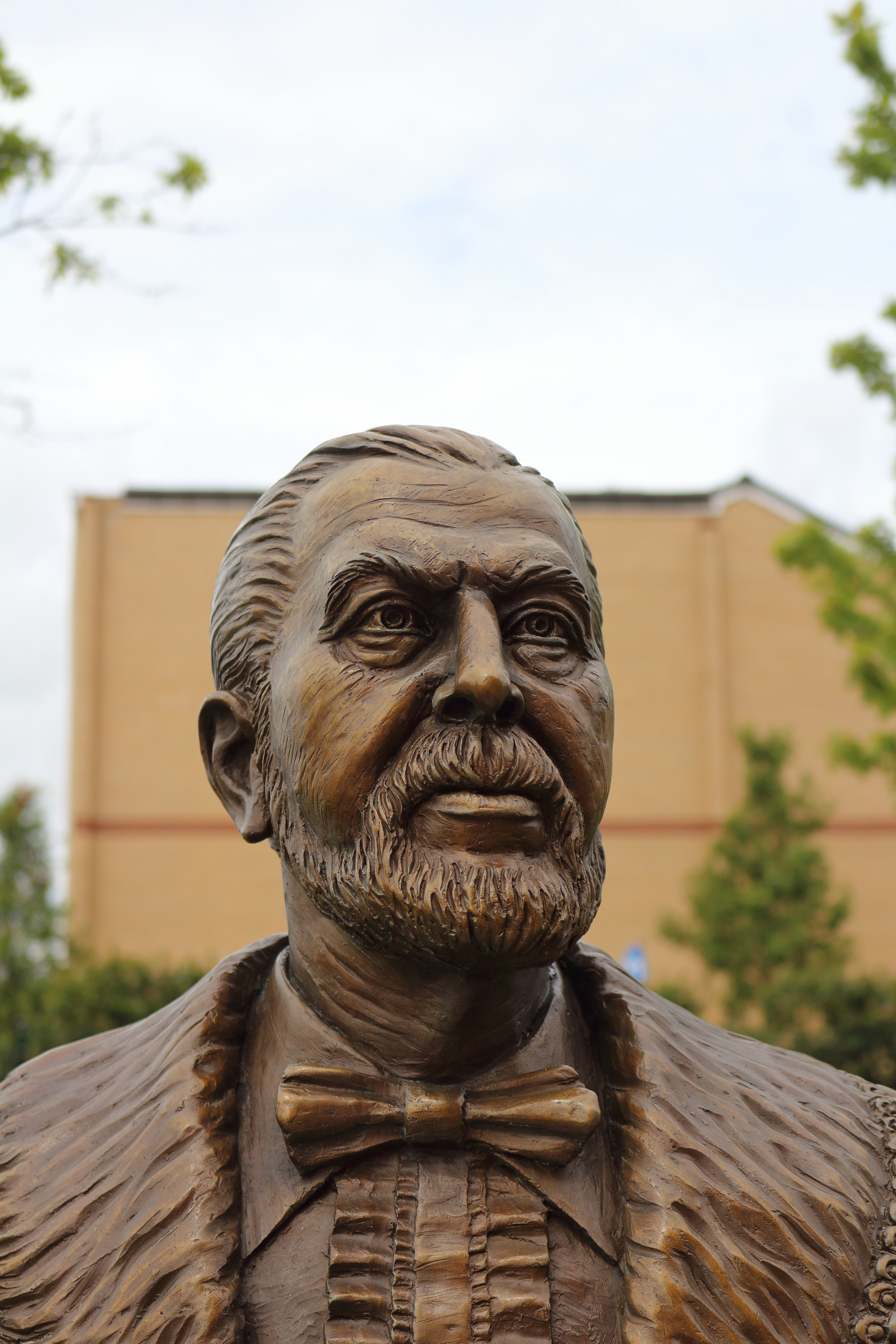
Sculpture outside Anfield of John Houlding, the founder of Liverpool F.C.

Liverpool were founded following a dispute between the Everton committee and John Houlding, club president and owner of the land at Anfield. After eight years at the stadium, Everton relocated across Stanley Park to their new stadium of Goodison Park in 1892, and Houlding founded Liverpool F.C. to play at Anfield. Originally named "Everton F.C. and Athletic Grounds Ltd" (Everton Athletic for short), the club became Liverpool F.C. in March 1892 and gained official recognition three months later, after The Football Association refused to recognise the club as Everton.

Liverpool played their first match on 1 September 1892: a pre-season friendly match against Rotherham Town which they won 7–1. The team Liverpool fielded against Rotherham was composed entirely of Scottish players; the players who came from Scotland to play in England in those days were known as the Scotch Professors. Manager John McKenna had recruited the players after a scouting trip to Scotland—so they became known as the "team of Macs". The team won the Lancashire League in its debut season and joined the Football League Second Division at the start of the 1893–94 season. After the club was promoted to the First Division in 1896, Tom Watson was appointed manager. He led Liverpool to its first league title in 1901, and won the league again in 1906.

Liverpool reached their first FA Cup final in 1914, losing 1–0 to Burnley. It won consecutive league championships in 1922 and 1923, a team which featured goalkeeper Elisha Scott, the club's longest-serving player, but did not win another trophy until the 1946–47 season, when the club won the First Division for a fifth time under the control of George Kay. Liverpool suffered its second Cup Final defeat in 1950, playing against Arsenal. In 1952, Anfield recorded its biggest attendance ever when 61,905 spectators watched Liverpool beat Wolverhampton Wanderers 2–1 in an FA Cup match. After 49 uninterrupted years in the top division of English football the club was relegated to the Second Division in the 1953–54 season. Soon after Liverpool lost 2–1 to non-league Worcester City in the 1958–59 FA Cup, Bill Shankly was appointed manager. Upon his arrival he released 24 players and converted a boot storage room at Anfield into a room where the coaches could discuss strategy; here, Shankly and other "Boot Room" members Joe Fagan, Reuben Bennett, and Bob Paisley began reshaping the team.

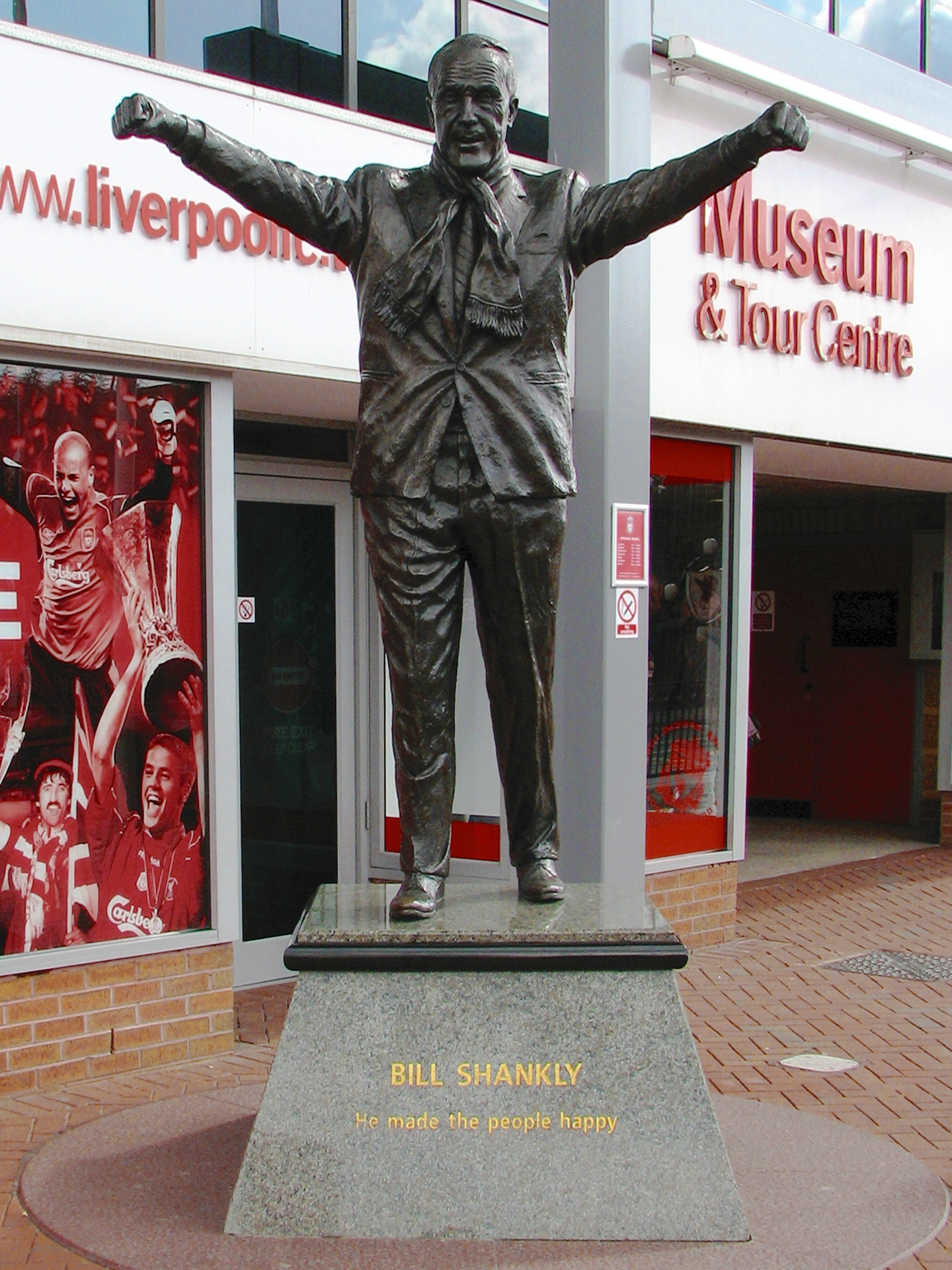
Statue of Bill Shankly outside Anfield. Shankly won promotion to the First Division and the club's first league title since 1947.

The club was promoted back into the First Division in 1962 and won it in 1964, for the first time in 17 years. In 1965, the club won its first FA Cup. The following year, the club won the First Division but lost to Borussia Dortmund in the European Cup Winners' Cup final. Liverpool won both the League and the UEFA Cup during the 1972–73 season, and the FA Cup again a year later. Shankly retired soon afterwards and was replaced by his assistant, Bob Paisley. In 1976, Paisley's second season as manager, the club won another League and UEFA Cup double. The following season, the club retained the League title and won the European Cup for the first time, but it lost in the 1977 FA Cup final. Liverpool retained the European Cup in 1978 and regained the First Division title in 1979. During Paisley's nine seasons as manager Liverpool won 20 trophies, including three European Cups, a UEFA Cup, six League titles and three consecutive League Cups; the only domestic trophy he did not win was the FA Cup.

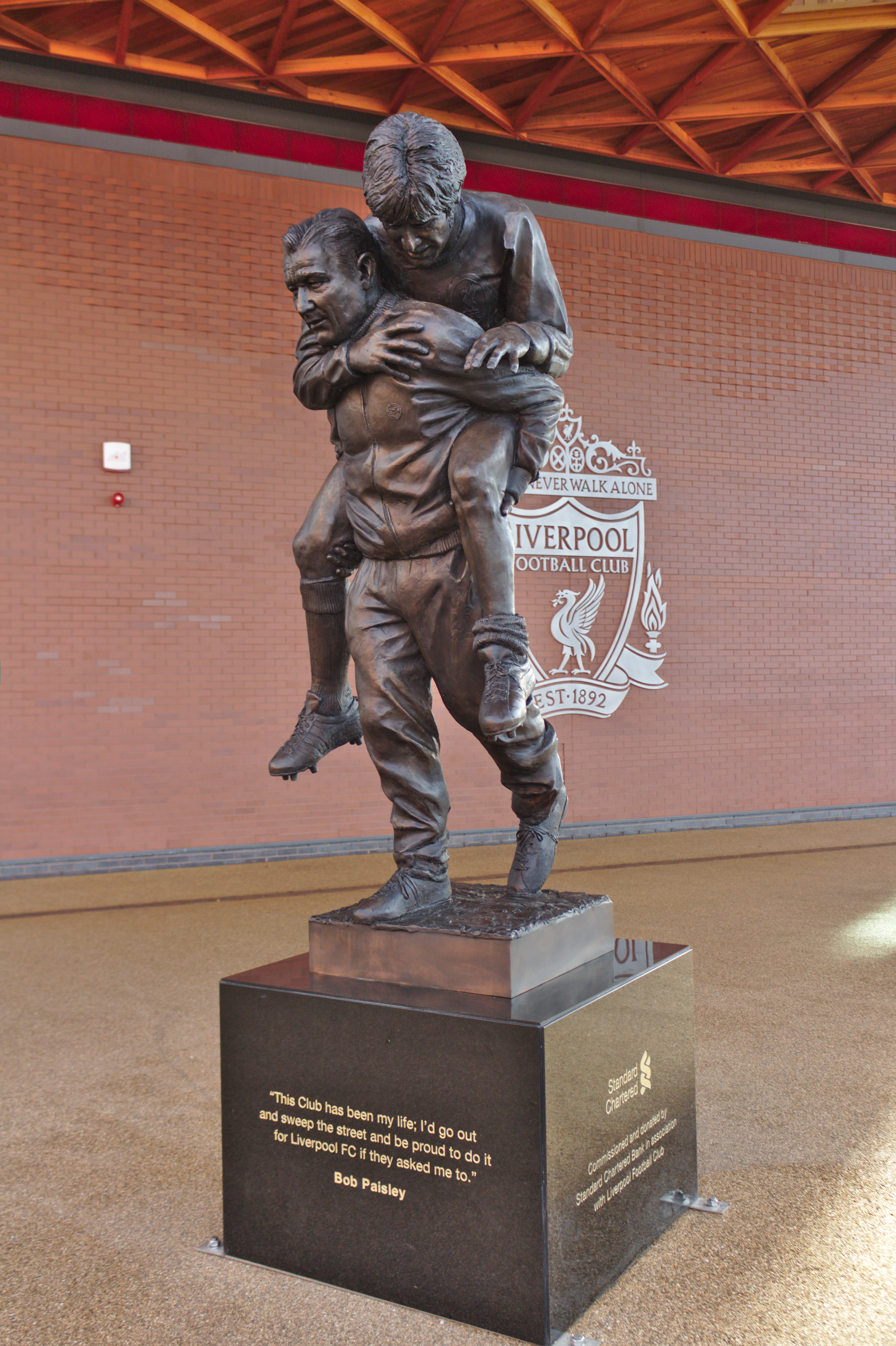
Statue of Bob Paisley carrying the injured former Liverpool captain Emlyn Hughes outside Anfield. Paisley remains the most successful manager in the club's history.

Paisley retired in 1983 and was replaced by his assistant, Joe Fagan. Liverpool won the League, League Cup and European Cup in Fagan's first season, becoming the first English side to win three trophies in a season. Liverpool reached the European Cup final again in 1985, against Juventus at the Heysel Stadium. Before kick-off, Liverpool fans breached a fence that separated the two groups of supporters and charged the Juventus fans. The resulting weight of people caused a retaining wall to collapse, killing 39 fans, mostly Italians. The incident became known as the Heysel Stadium disaster. The match was played in spite of protests by both managers, and Liverpool lost 1–0 to Juventus. As a result of the tragedy, English clubs were banned from participating in European competition for five years; Liverpool received a ten-year ban, which was later reduced to six years. Fourteen Liverpool fans received convictions for involuntary manslaughter.

Fagan had announced his retirement just before the disaster and Kenny Dalglish was appointed as player-manager. During his tenure, the club won another three league titles and two FA Cups, including a League and Cup "Double" in the 1985–86 season. Liverpool's success was overshadowed by the Hillsborough disaster: in an FA Cup semi-final against Nottingham Forest on 15 April 1989, hundreds of Liverpool fans were crushed against perimeter fencing. Ninety-four fans died that day; the 95th victim died in hospital from his injuries four days later, the 96th died nearly four years later, without regaining consciousness, and the 97th, Andrew Devine, died in 2021 of injuries sustained in the disaster. After the Hillsborough disaster there was a government review of stadium safety. The resulting Taylor Report paved the way for legislation that required top-division teams to have all-seater stadiums. The report ruled that the main reason for the disaster was overcrowding due to a failure of police control.

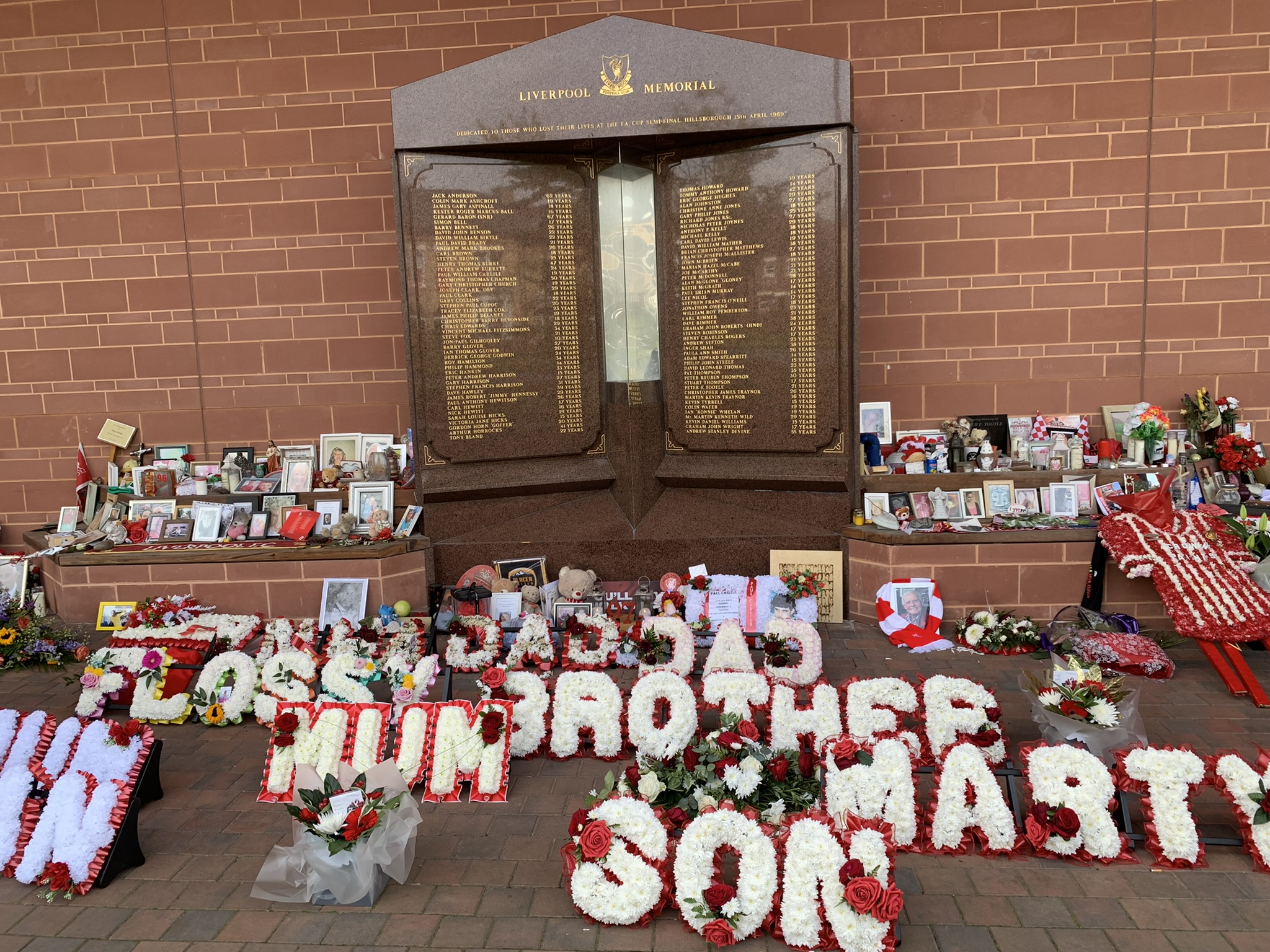
The Hillsborough memorial, which is engraved with the names of the 97 people who died in the Hillsborough disaster.

Liverpool was involved in the closest finish to a league season during the 1988–89 season, finishing equal with Arsenal on both points and goal difference, but lost the title on total goals scored when Arsenal scored the final goal in the last minute of the season.

Dalglish cited the Hillsborough disaster and its repercussions as the reason for his resignation in 1991; he was replaced by former player Graeme Souness. Under his leadership Liverpool won the 1992 FA Cup final, but their league performances slumped, with two consecutive sixth-place finishes, eventually resulting in his dismissal in January 1994. Souness was replaced by Roy Evans, and Liverpool went on to win the 1995 Football League Cup final. While they made some title challenges under Evans, third-place finishes in 1996 and 1998 were the best they could manage, and so Gérard Houllier was appointed co-manager in the 1998–99 season, and became the sole manager in November 1998 after Evans resigned. In 2001, Houllier's second full season in charge, Liverpool won a "treble": the FA Cup, League Cup and UEFA Cup. Houllier underwent major heart surgery during the 2001–02 season and Liverpool finished second in the League, behind Arsenal. They won a further League Cup in 2003, but failed to mount a title challenge in the two seasons that followed.

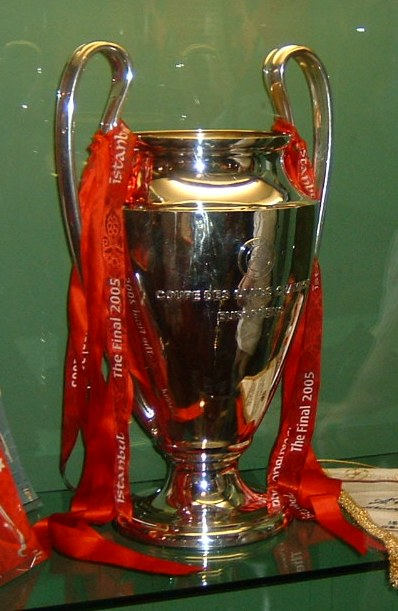
The European Cup, trophy won by Liverpool for a fifth time in 2005.

Houllier was replaced by Rafael Benítez in June 2004. Despite finishing fifth in Benítez's first season, Liverpool won the 2004–05 UEFA Champions League, beating AC Milan 3–2 in a penalty shootout after the match ended with a score of 3–3. The following season, Liverpool finished third in the Premier League and won the FA Cup, beating West Ham United in a penalty shootout after the match finished 3–3. American businessmen George Gillett and Tom Hicks became the owners of the club during the 2006–07 season, in a deal which valued the club and its outstanding debts at £218.9 million. The club reached the 2007 UEFA Champions League final against Milan, as it had in 2005, but lost 2–1. During the 2008–09 season Liverpool achieved 86 points, its then-highest Premier League points total, prior to the record-breaking 2018–19 season, and finished as runners up to Manchester United.

In the 2009–10 season, Liverpool finished seventh in the Premier League and failed to qualify for the Champions League. Benítez subsequently left by mutual consent and was replaced by Fulham manager Roy Hodgson. At the start of the 2010–11 season Liverpool was on the verge of bankruptcy and the club's creditors asked the High Court to allow the sale of the club, overruling the wishes of Hicks and Gillett. John W. Henry, owner of the Boston Red Sox and Fenway Sports Group, bid successfully for the club and took ownership in October 2010. Poor results during the start of that season led to Hodgson leaving the club by mutual consent and former player and manager Kenny Dalglish taking over. In the 2011–12 season, Liverpool secured a record eighth League Cup success and reached the FA Cup final, but finished eighth in the Premier League, their worst league finish in 18 years; this led to the dismissal of Dalglish. He was replaced by Brendan Rodgers, whose Liverpool team in the 2013–14 season mounted an unexpected title charge to finish second behind champions Manchester City and subsequently return to the Champions League, scoring 101 goals in the process, the most since the 106 scored in the 1895–96 season. Following a disappointing 2014–15 season, where Liverpool finished sixth in the league, and a poor start to the following campaign, Rodgers was dismissed in October 2015.

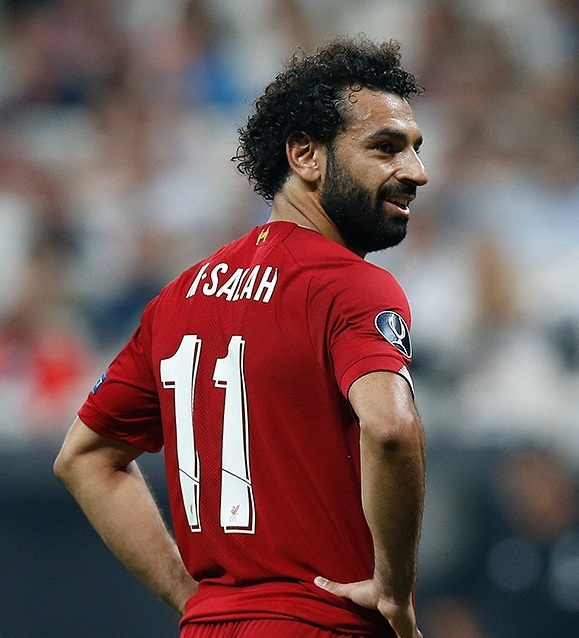
Mohamed Salah is Liverpool's third-leading goalscorer in the club's history, behind Ian Rush and Roger Hunt, and the club's leading goalscorer in the Premier League era.

Rodgers was replaced by Jürgen Klopp. Liverpool reached the finals of the Football League Cup and UEFA Europa League in Klopp's first season, finishing as runner-up in both competitions. The club finished second in the 2018–19 season with 97 points – surpassing the 86 points gained during the 2008–09 season and a points record for a non-title winning side – and only one loss. Klopp took Liverpool to successive UEFA Champions League finals in 2018 and 2019, with the club defeating Tottenham Hotspur 2–0 to win the latter. Liverpool beat Flamengo of Brazil in the final 1–0 to win the FIFA Club World Cup for the first time. The following season, Liverpool won their first top-flight league title in thirty years. The club set multiple records in the season; they won the league with seven games remaining, the earliest any team has ever won the title, reaching a club record 99 points, and won a joint-record 32 games in a top-flight season. The 2021–22 season saw the club win the domestic cup double, the FA Cup and the League Cup. In January 2024, Klopp announced that he would leave the club at the end of the season, and he won his final trophy with the club, the League Cup, the following month.

Arne Slot was announced as Klopp's successor in May 2024, and the club won a record-equalling twentieth top-flight league title in his first season in charge. After a fifth place finish in the league the following season, Slot was dismissed as head coach on 30 May 2026, and was replaced by Andoni Iraola five days later.

== Colours and badge ==
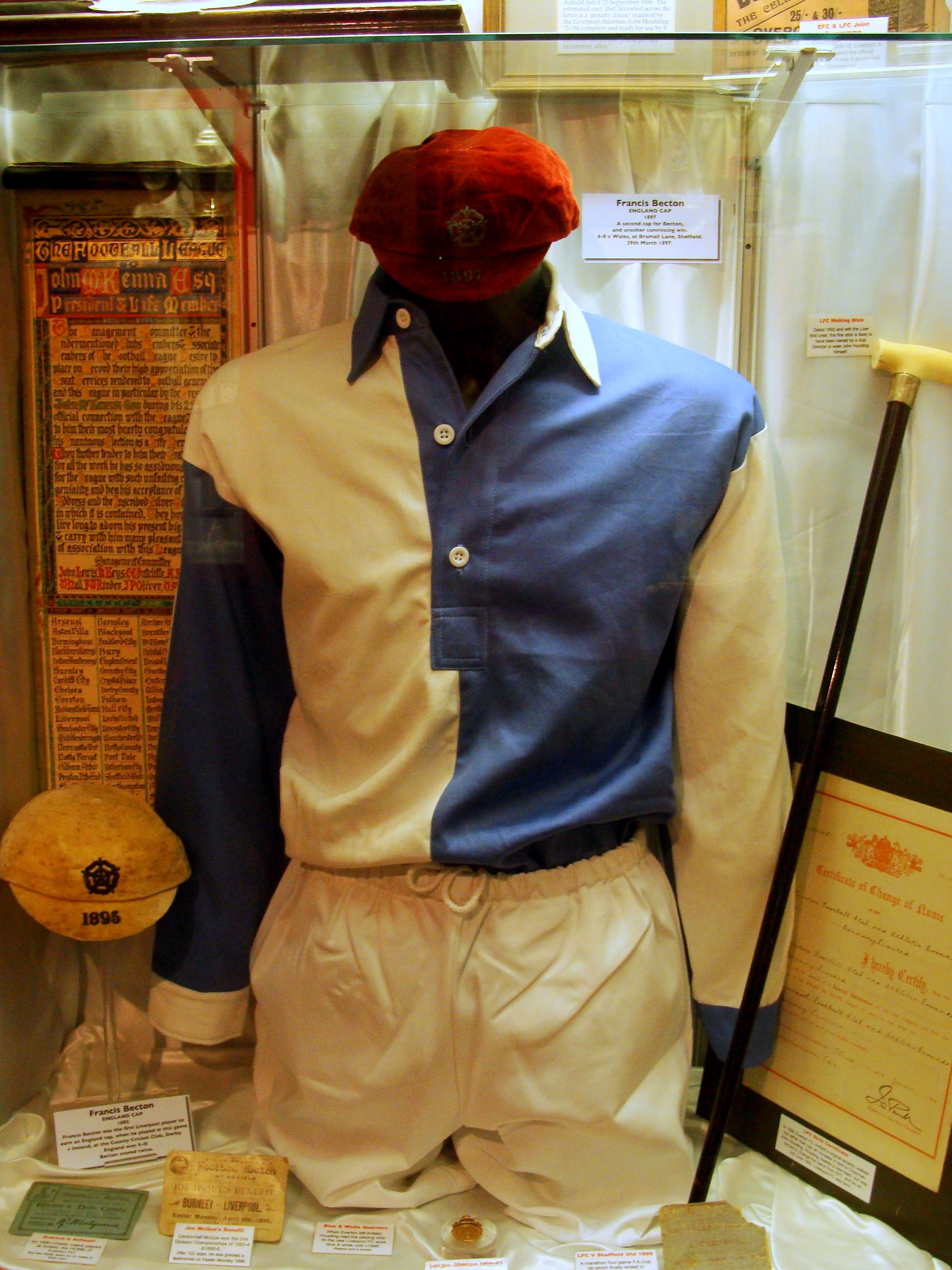
Liverpool's home colours worn from 1892 to 1896

For much of Liverpool's history, its home colours have been all red. When the club was founded in 1892, blue and white quartered shirts were used until the club adopted the city's colour of red in 1896. The city's symbol of the liver bird is the club's badge (or crest, as it is sometimes known) having first appeared in a flag over Anfield in September 1892 two weeks after the club's first competitive match, and from the turn of the century it appeared on official club correspondence, the club's 1922 championship banner, club programmes, the players track-suit tops from the 1930s before it first appeared on the club's white away shirts at the 1950 FA Cup final, and was then incorporated in the red home shirt in 1955. Liverpool continued to wear red shirts and white shorts until 1964 when manager Bill Shankly decided to change to an all-red strip. Liverpool played in all red for the first time against Anderlecht, as Ian St John recalled in his autobiography:

He [Shankly] thought the colour scheme would carry psychological impact – red for danger, red for power. He came into the dressing room one day and threw a pair of red shorts to Ronnie Yeats. "Get into those shorts and let's see how you look", he said. "Christ, Ronnie, you look awesome, terrifying. You look 7 ft tall." "Why not go the whole hog, boss?" I suggested. "Why not wear red socks? Let's go out all in red." Shankly approved and an iconic kit was born.

The Liverpool away strip has more often than not been all yellow or white shirts and black shorts, but there have been several exceptions. An all grey kit was introduced in 1987, which was used until the 1991–92 centenary season when it was replaced by a combination of green shirts and white shorts. After various colour combinations in the 1990s, including gold and navy, bright yellow, black and grey, and ecru, the club alternated between yellow and white away kits until the 2008–09 season, when it re-introduced the grey kit. A third kit is designed for European away matches, though it is also worn in domestic away matches on occasions when the current away kit clashes with a team's home kit. Between 2012 and 2015, the kits were designed by Warrior Sports, who became the club's kit providers at the start of the 2012–13 season. In February 2015, Warrior's parent company New Balance announced it would be entering the global football market, with teams sponsored by Warrior now being outfitted by New Balance. The only other branded shirts worn by the club were made by Umbro until 1985, when they were replaced by Adidas, who produced the kits until 1996 when Reebok took over. They produced the kits for 10 years before Adidas made the kits from 2006 to 2012. Nike became the club's official kit supplier at the start of the 2020–21 season. In 2025, the club reunited with Adidas in a new 10-year partnership.

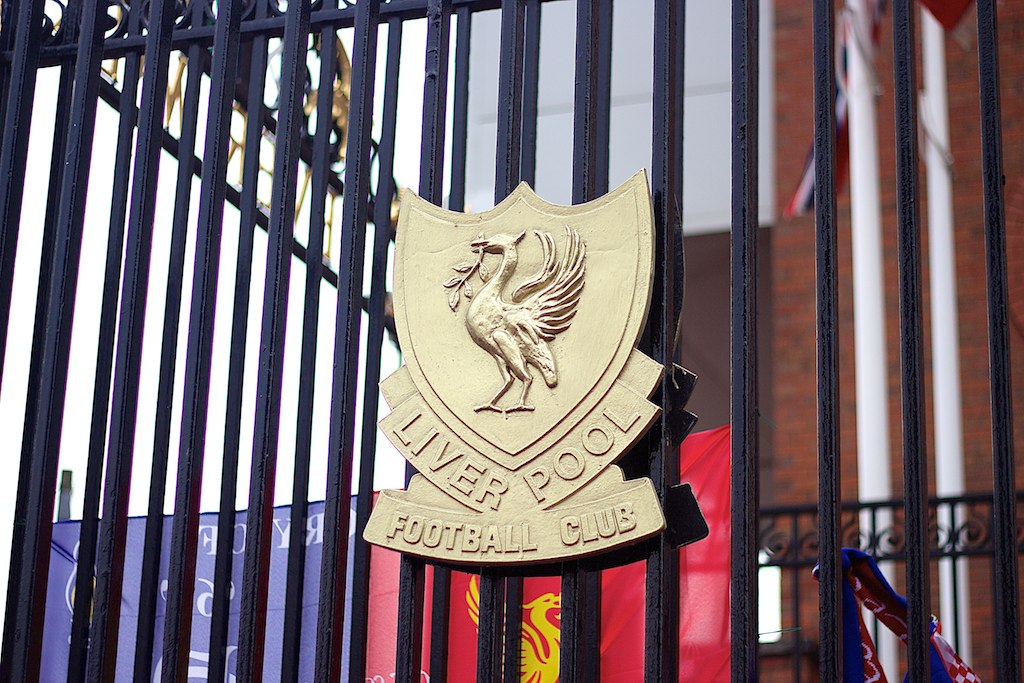
A version of Liverpool's badge as depicted on the Shankly Gates

Liverpool was the first English professional club to have a sponsor's logo on its shirts, after agreeing a deal with Hitachi in 1979. However, for the first few years of the deal, broadcasting rules meant that sponsors' logos could not be shown on shirts for televised matches.

Since then, the club has been sponsored by Crown Paints, Candy, Carlsberg and Standard Chartered. The contract with Carlsberg, which was signed in 1992, was the longest-lasting agreement in English top-flight football. The association with Carlsberg ended at the start of the 2010–11 season, when Standard Chartered Bank became the club's sponsor. In September 2026, it was announced that Turkish Airlines will replace Standard Chartered as the club's main shirt sponsor from the start of the 2027–28 season following the signing of a five-year contract with the airline.

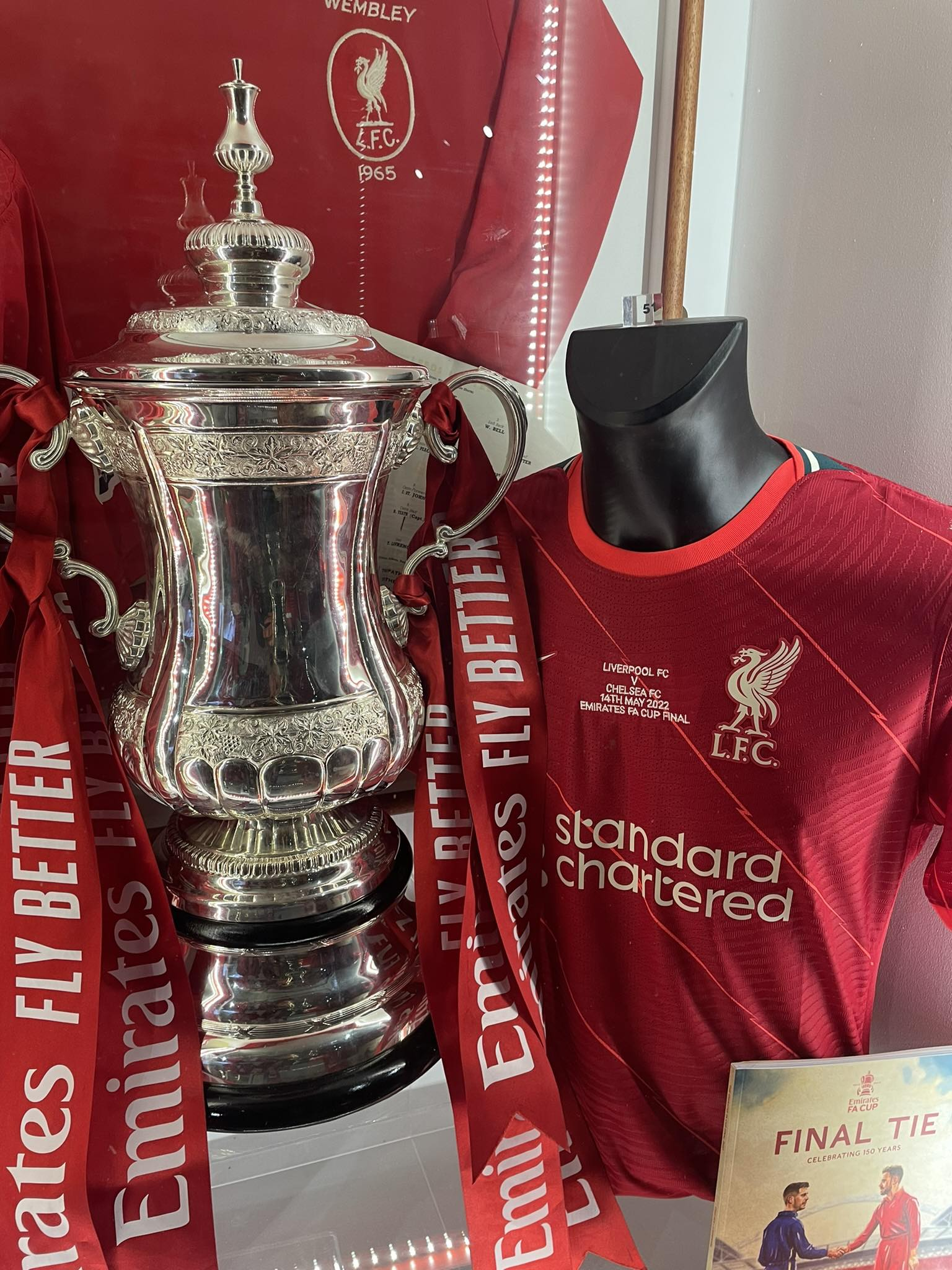
The club's crest on their home shirts from 1965 (top) and 2022 (right) worn in two of their FA Cup wins

The Liverpool badge is based on the city's liver bird symbol, which in the past had been placed inside a shield. In 1977, a red liver bird standing on a football (blazoned as "Statant upon a football a Liver Bird wings elevated and addorsed holding in the beak a piece of seaweed gules") was granted as a heraldic badge by the College of Arms to the English Football League intended for use by Liverpool. However, Liverpool never made use of this badge. In 1992, to commemorate the centennial of the club, a new badge was commissioned, including a representation of the Shankly Gates. The next year twin flames were added at either side, symbolic of the Hillsborough memorial outside Anfield, where an eternal flame burns in memory of those who died in the Hillsborough disaster. In 2012, Warrior Sports' first Liverpool kit removed the shield and gates, returning the badge to what had adorned Liverpool shirts in the 1970s; the flames were moved to the back collar of the shirt, surrounding the number 96 for the number who died at Hillsborough. Following the death of Andrew Devine, and the subsequent ruling by a coroner that he was also unlawfully killed, the number 97 has been worn in this place since the beginning of the 2022–23 season.

== Stadium ==
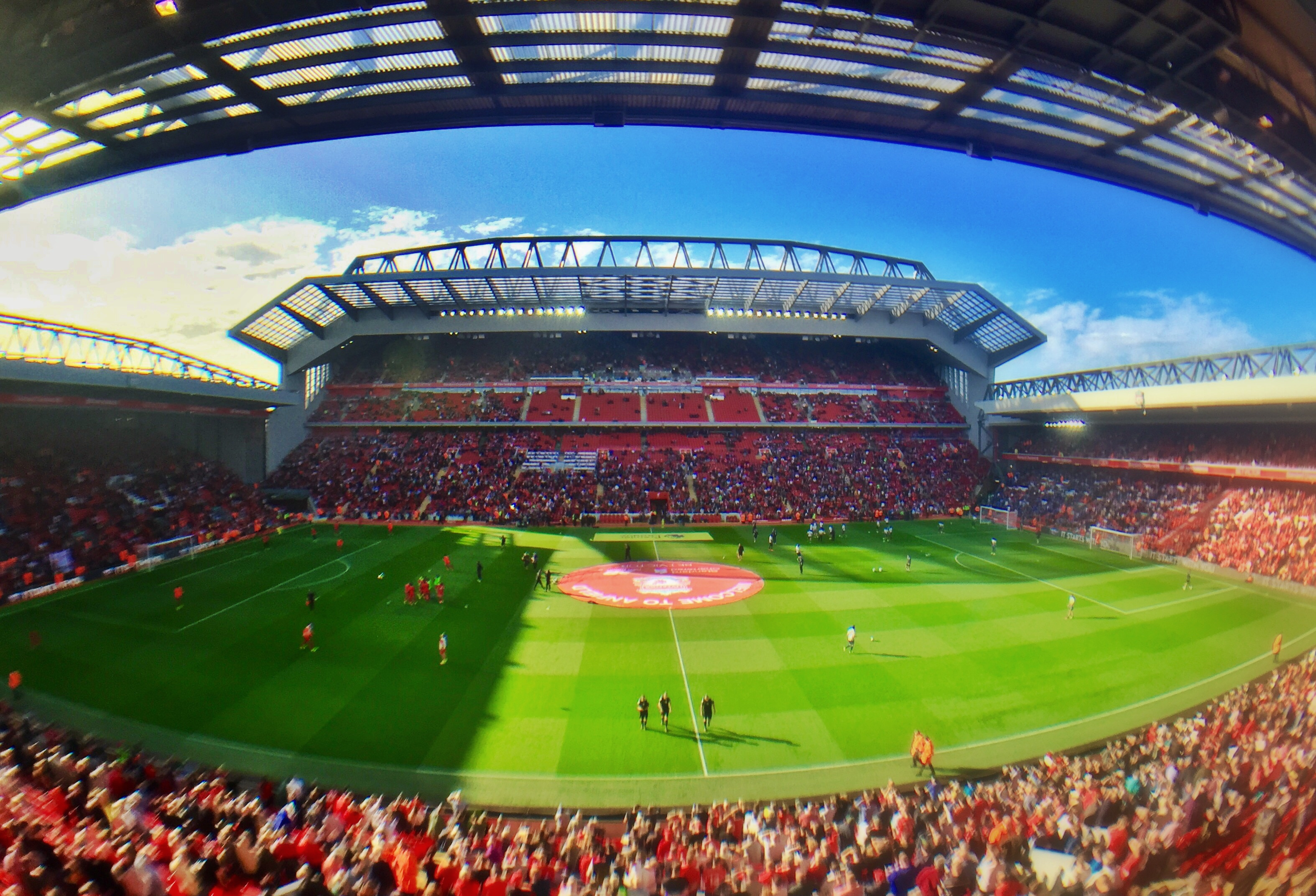
Anfield, home of Liverpool F.C.

Liverpool's home stadium is Anfield, which was built in 1884 on land adjacent to Stanley Park. Situated 2 miles (3.2 km) from Liverpool city centre, it was originally used by Everton before the latter moved to Goodison Park after a dispute over rent with Anfield owner John Houlding. Left with an empty ground, Houlding founded Liverpool in 1892 and the club has played at Anfield ever since. The capacity of the stadium at the time was 20,000, although only 100 spectators attended Liverpool's first match at Anfield.

The Kop is the stadium section where Liverpool's most vocal supporters, often referred to as "Kopites", have traditionally gathered. Historically, the Kop was a terraced stand before it was converted to seating, and it has long been recognized as the heart of Anfield's fan base. The Kop has been called "one of the most famous ends of a stadium in world football" by BBC Sport, and Liverpool traditionally attack towards it in the second half of games. It was originally built in 1906 due to the high turnout for matches and was called the Oakfield Road Embankment. Its first game was on 1 September 1906 when the home side beat Stoke City 1–0. In 1906, the banked stand at one end of the ground was formally renamed the Spion Kop after a hill in KwaZulu-Natal. The hill was the site of the Battle of Spion Kop in the Second Boer War, where over 300 men of the Lancashire Regiment died, many of them from Liverpool. At its peak, the stand could hold 28,000 spectators and was one of the largest single-tier stands in the world. Many stadiums in England had stands named after Spion Kop, but Anfield's was the largest of them at the time; it could hold more supporters than some entire football grounds.

Anfield could accommodate more than 60,000 supporters at its peak and had a capacity of 55,000 until the 1990s, when, following recommendations from the Taylor Report, all clubs in the Premier League were obliged to convert to all-seater stadiums in time for the 1993–94 season, reducing its capacity to 45,276. The findings of the report precipitated the redevelopment of the Kemlyn Road Stand, which was rebuilt in 1992, coinciding with the centenary of the club, and was known as the Centenary Stand until 2017 when it was renamed the Sir Kenny Dalglish Stand. An extra tier was added to the Anfield Road end in 1998, which further increased the capacity of the ground but gave rise to problems when it was opened. A series of support poles and stanchions were inserted to give extra stability to the top tier of the stand after movement of the tier was reported at the start of the 1999–2000 season.

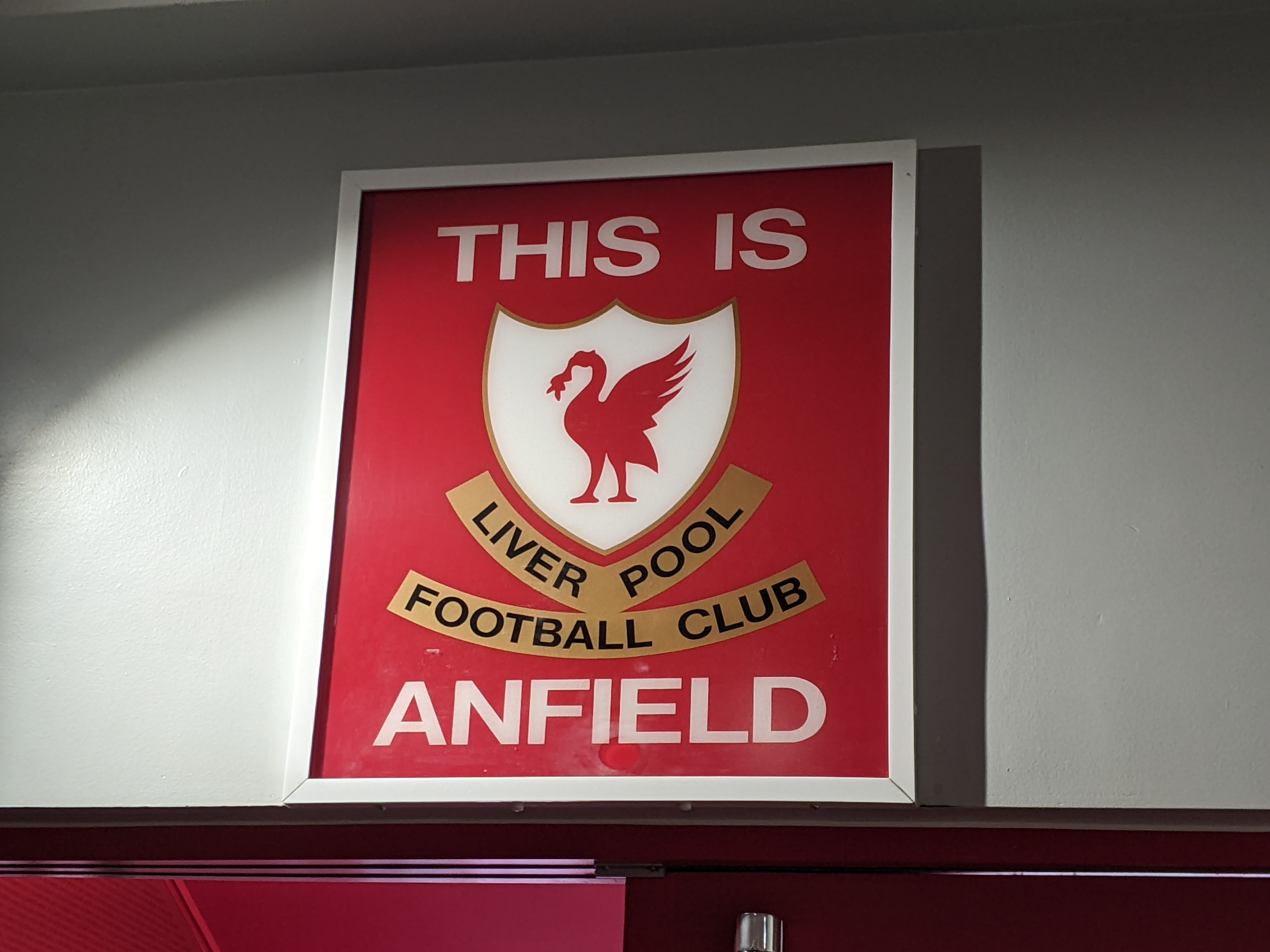
This is Anfield sign, installed by Shankly in 1972, is located above the entrance to the players' tunnel

Because of restrictions on expanding the capacity at Anfield, Liverpool announced plans to move to the proposed Stanley Park Stadium in May 2002. Planning permission was granted in July 2004, and in September 2006, Liverpool City Council agreed to grant Liverpool a 999-year lease on the proposed site. Following the takeover of the club by George Gillett and Tom Hicks in February 2007, the proposed stadium was redesigned. The new design was approved by the Council in November 2007. The stadium was scheduled to open in August 2011 and would hold 60,000 spectators, with HKS, Inc. contracted to build the stadium. Construction was halted in August 2008, as Gillett and Hicks had difficulty in financing the £300 million needed for the development. In October 2012, BBC Sport reported that Fenway Sports Group, the new owners of Liverpool, had decided to redevelop their current home at Anfield rather than building a new stadium in Stanley Park. As part of the redevelopment, the capacity of Anfield was to increase from 45,276 to approximately 60,000 and would cost approximately £150 million. When construction was completed on the new Main stand, the capacity of Anfield was increased to 54,074. This £100 million expansion added a third tier to the stand. This was all part of a £260 million project to improve the Anfield area. Jürgen Klopp the manager at the time described the stand as "impressive". The 'This is Anfield' sign, installed by Shankly in 1972 to instil fear into the opposition, was temporarily removed during the reconstruction of the Main stand before it was restored to the new players' tunnel upon its completion.

In June 2021, it was reported that Liverpool City Council had given planning permission for the club to renovate and expand the Anfield Road stand, boosting the capacity by around 7,000 and taking the overall capacity at Anfield to 61,276. The expansion, which is estimated to cost £60 million, was described as "a huge milestone" by managing director Andy Hughes, and would also see rail seating being trialled in the Kop for the 2021–22 Premier League season. The first league game to feature an attendance of over 60,000 at Anfield, following the near completion of the Anfield Road stand redevelopment, was a Premier League match against Brighton & Hove Albion on 31 March 2024.

== Support ==
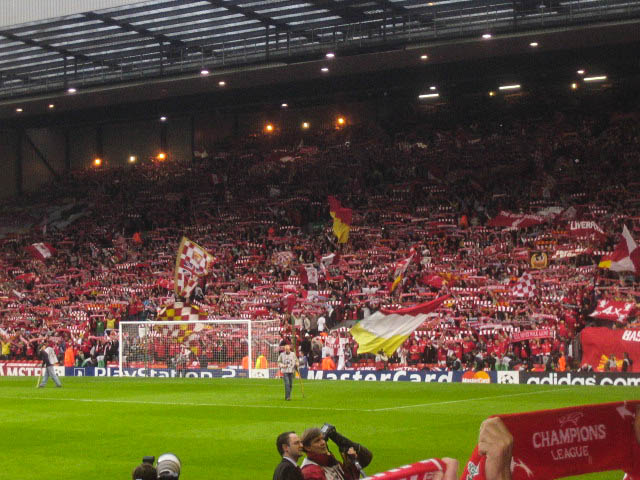
Kopites in The Kop

Liverpool is one of the best supported clubs in the world. The club states that its worldwide fan base includes 300 officially recognised Supporters Clubs in 100 countries. Notable groups include Spirit of Shankly. The club takes advantage of this support through its worldwide summer tours, which has included playing in front of 95,000 in Melbourne, Australia, and 67,000 in Yokohama, Japan. The club also has a significant following on social media, and in 2024, it became the first Premier League club (and the third sports team in the world, after Barcelona and Real Madrid) to amass 10 million subscribers on YouTube. In 2026, Liverpool generated 14.7 billion social video views over the previous year, the Premier League's most-engaged club for the third consecutive season, and had the league's most-visited club website. In 2025, the club received orders from more than 150 countries for the team's replica shirts. In 2024, the club ranked joint-first (with Manchester United) for kit sales among Premier league clubs. Liverpool fans often refer to themselves as Kopites, a reference to the fans who once stood, and now sit, on the Kop at Anfield. In 2008, a group of fans formed a splinter club, A.F.C. Liverpool, to play matches for fans who had been priced out of watching Premier League football.

The song "You'll Never Walk Alone", originally from the Rodgers and Hammerstein musical Carousel and later recorded by Liverpool musicians Gerry and the Pacemakers, is the club's anthem and has been sung by the Anfield crowd since the early 1960s. Simon Hart of The Independent wrote: "The pre-match, scarfs-raised, sing-it-loud ritual is as much a part of Liverpool's fabric as their red shirts." The song's title adorns the top of the Shankly Gates, which were unveiled on 2 August 1982 in memory of former manager Bill Shankly. The "You'll Never Walk Alone" portion of the Shankly Gates is also reproduced on the club's badge.

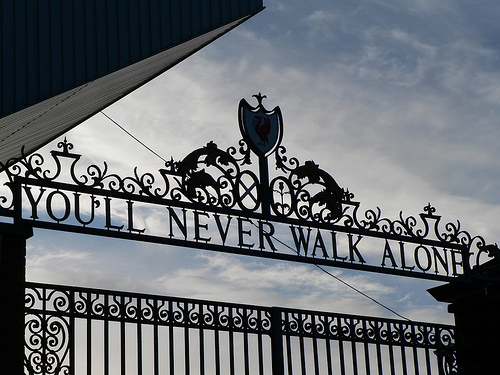
The Shankly Gates with the club's anthem, erected in honour of former manager Bill Shankly

The club's supporters have been involved in two stadium disasters. The first was the 1985 Heysel Stadium disaster, in which 39 people, mostly Italians and Juventus supporters, were killed. They were confined to a corner by Liverpool fans who had charged in their direction; the weight of the cornered fans caused a wall to collapse. UEFA laid the blame for the incident solely on the Liverpool supporters, and banned all English clubs from European competition for five years. Liverpool was banned for an additional year, preventing it from participating in the 1990–91 European Cup, despite winning the league in 1990. Twenty-seven fans were arrested on suspicion of manslaughter and were extradited to Belgium in 1987 to face trial. In 1989, after a five-month trial in Belgium, 14 Liverpool fans were given three-year sentences for involuntary manslaughter; half of the terms were suspended.

The second disaster took place during an FA Cup semi-final between Liverpool and Nottingham Forest at Hillsborough Stadium, Sheffield, on 15 April 1989. Ninety-seven Liverpool fans died as a consequence of overcrowding at the Leppings Lane end, in what became known as the Hillsborough disaster. In the following days, The Sun's coverage of the event spread falsehoods, particularly an article entitled "The Truth" that claimed that Liverpool fans had robbed the dead and had urinated on and attacked the police. Subsequent investigations proved the allegations false, leading to a boycott of the newspaper by Liverpool fans across the city and elsewhere; many still refuse to buy The Sun 30 years later. Many support organisations were set up in the wake of the disaster, such as the Hillsborough Justice Campaign, which represents bereaved families, survivors and supporters in their efforts to secure justice.

=== Rivalries ===
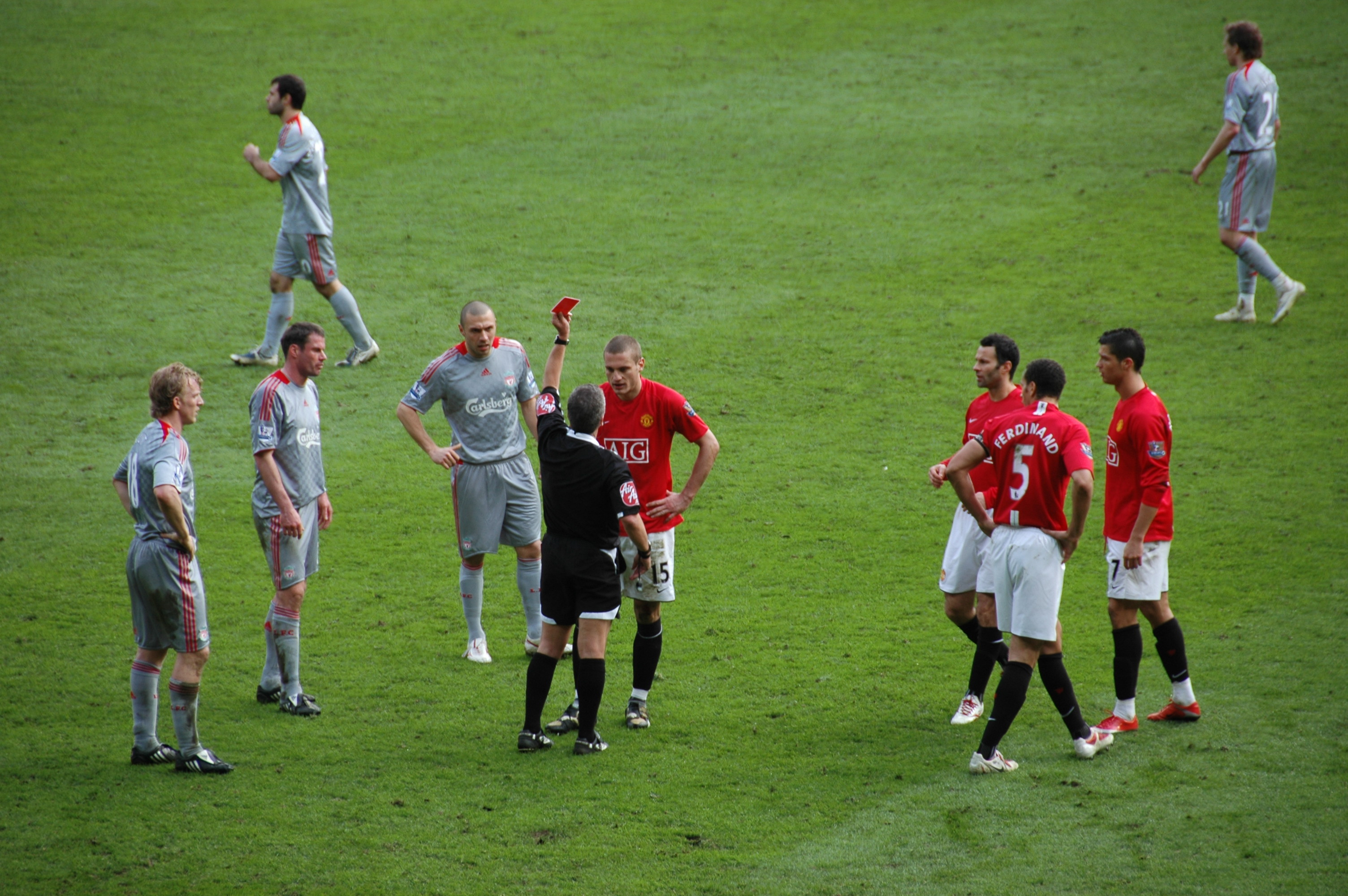
Liverpool players (in grey) during the 4–1 win against Manchester United at Old Trafford on 14 March 2009.

Liverpool's longest-established rivalry is with fellow Liverpool team Everton, against whom they contest the Merseyside derby. The rivalry stems from Liverpool's formation and the dispute with Everton officials and the then owners of Anfield. The Merseyside derby is one of the few local derbies which do not enforce fan segregation, and hence has been known as the "friendly derby". Since the mid-1980s, the rivalry has intensified both on and off the field and, since the inception of the Premier League in 1992, the Merseyside derby has had more players sent off than any other Premier League game. It has been referred to as "the most ill-disciplined and explosive fixture in the Premier League". In terms of support within the city, the number of Liverpool fans outweighs Everton supporters by a ratio of 2:1.

Liverpool's rivalry with Manchester United stems from the cities' competition in the Industrial Revolution of the 19th century. Connected by the world's first inter-city railway, by road Liverpool and Manchester are separated by approximately 30 miles (48 km) along the East Lancs Road. Ranked the two biggest clubs in England by France Football magazine, Liverpool and Manchester United are the most successful English teams in both domestic and international competitions, and both clubs have a global fanbase. Viewed as one of the biggest rivalries in world football, it is considered the most famous fixture in English football. Both clubs tour internationally during pre-season, and in 2018 they faced each other in front of 101,000 in Michigan in the U.S. The two clubs alternated as champions between 1964 and 1967, and Manchester United became the first English team to win the European Cup in 1968, followed by Liverpool's four European Cup victories. Despite the 40 league titles and nine European Cups between them, the two rivals have rarely been successful at the same time – Liverpool's run of titles in the 1970s and 1980s coincided with Manchester United's 26-year title drought while United's success in the Premier League era coincided with Liverpool's 30-year title drought, with the two clubs having finished first and second in the league only five times. Such is the rivalry between the clubs that they rarely do transfer business with each other. The last player to be transferred between the two clubs was Phil Chisnall, who moved to Liverpool from Manchester United in 1964.

== Ownership and finances ==
As the owner of Anfield and founder of Liverpool, John Houlding was the club's first chairman, a position he held from its founding in 1892 until 1904. John McKenna took over as chairman after Houlding's departure. McKenna subsequently became President of the Football League. The chairmanship changed hands many times before John Smith, whose father was a shareholder of the club, took up the role in 1973. He oversaw the most successful period in Liverpool's history before stepping down in 1990. His successor was Noel White who became chairman in 1990. In August 1991 David Moores, whose family had owned the club for more than 50 years, became chairman. His uncle John Moores was also a shareholder at Liverpool and was chairman of Everton from 1961 to 1973. Moores owned 51 percent of the club, and in 2004 expressed his willingness to consider a bid for his shares in Liverpool.

Moores eventually sold the club to American businessmen George Gillett and Tom Hicks on 6 February 2007. The deal valued the club and its outstanding debts at £218.9 million. The pair paid £5,000 per share, or £174.1 million for the total shareholding and £44.8 million to cover the club's debts. Disagreements between Gillett and Hicks, and the fans' lack of support for them, resulted in the pair looking to sell the club. Martin Broughton was appointed chairman of the club on 16 April 2010 to oversee its sale. In May 2010, accounts were released showing the holding company of the club to be £350 million in debt (due to leveraged takeover) with losses of £55m, causing auditor KPMG to qualify its audit opinion. The group's creditors, including the Royal Bank of Scotland, took Gillett and Hicks to court to force them to allow the board to proceed with the sale of the club, the major asset of the holding company. A High Court judge, Mr Justice Floyd, ruled in favour of the creditors and paved the way for the sale of the club to John W. Henry's Fenway Sports Group (formerly New England Sports Ventures), although Gillett and Hicks still had the option to appeal. Liverpool was sold to Fenway Sports Group on 15 October 2010 for £300 million.

Liverpool has been described as a global brand; a 2010 report valued the club's trademarks and associated intellectual property at £141 million, an increase of £5 million on the previous year. The club was given a brand rating of AA (Very Strong). In May 2024, business magazine Forbes ranked Liverpool as the fourth-most valuable football club in the world, behind Real Madrid, Manchester United, and Barcelona; they valued the club at $5.37 billion. According to a 2018 report by accountants Deloitte, the club had an annual revenue of €424.2 million for the previous year, and Forbes valued the club at $1.944 billion. In 2018, annual revenue increased to €513.7 million, and Forbes valued the club at $2.183 billion. In 2019, revenue increased to €604 million (£533 million) according to Deloitte, with the club breaching the half a billion pounds mark.

In April 2020, the owners of the club came under fire from fans and the media for deciding to furlough all non-playing staff during the COVID-19 pandemic. In response to this, the club made a U-turn on the decision and apologised for their initial decision. In April 2021, Forbes valued the club at $4.1 billion, a two-year increase of 88%, making it the world's fifth-most-valuable football club. With Liverpool being ranked as the fourth-most valuable football club in the world in May 2024, at $5.37 billion, this was an increase of roughly 21% from 2022.

A major change in ownership structure was announced on 14 August 2026, when Fenway Sports Group agreed to sell a 38% stake to 1892 Holdings, a consortium led and managed by Amit Bhatia. The consortium also includes Jeff Bezos, who will not take a seat in the board and is represented by managing partner Bryan Baum, Facebook co-founder Eduardo Saverin and the Mittal family.

== In the media ==
Liverpool featured in the first edition of BBC's Match of the Day, which screened highlights of their match against Arsenal at Anfield on 22 August 1964. The first football match to be televised in colour was between Liverpool and West Ham United, broadcast live in March 1967. Liverpool striker and 1947 league title winner Albert Stubbins appeared on the front cover of The Beatles' 1967 album Sgt. Pepper's Lonely Hearts Club Band, the only footballer to be depicted. Liverpool fans featured in the Pink Floyd song "Fearless", in which they sang excerpts from "You'll Never Walk Alone". To mark the club's appearance in the 1988 FA Cup final, Liverpool released the "Anfield Rap", a song featuring John Barnes and other members of the squad.

A docudrama on the Hillsborough disaster, written by Jimmy McGovern, was screened in 1996. It featured Christopher Eccleston as Trevor Hicks, who lost two teenage daughters in the disaster, went on to campaign for safer stadiums, and helped to form the Hillsborough Families Support Group. Liverpool featured in the 2001 film The 51st State, in which ex-hitman Felix DeSouza (Robert Carlyle) is a keen supporter of the team and the last scene takes place at a match between Liverpool and Manchester United. The club also featured in the 1984 children's television show Scully, about a young boy who tries to gain a trial with Liverpool. The Doctor Who episode "The Halloween Apocalypse", aired in October 2021, features The Doctor (played by Jodie Whittaker) exiting the TARDIS outside Anfield, as she exclaims: "Liverpool? Anfield! Klopp era, classic!".

In 2024, Liverpool was named the most-watched club in world football across the last five seasons by media analytics firm Nielsen with an average per season global broadcast audience of more than 724 million across league and cup fixtures.

== Players ==
=== First-team squad ===
As of 1 September 2026

Note: Flags indicate national team as defined under FIFA eligibility rules; some limited exceptions apply. Players may hold more than one non-FIFA nationality.

No.	Pos.	Nation	Player
1	GK	BRA	Alisson Becker (vice-captain)
2	DF	ENG	Joe Gomez (vice-captain)
3	MF	JPN	Wataru Endo
4	DF	NED	Virgil van Dijk (captain)
5	DF	FRA	Jérémy Jacquet
6	DF	HUN	Milos Kerkez
7	MF	GER	Florian Wirtz
8	MF	HUN	Dominik Szoboszlai (vice-captain)
9	FW	SWE	Alexander Isak
10	MF	ARG	Alexis Mac Allister
12	DF	NIR	Conor Bradley
14	FW	ITA	Federico Chiesa
15	DF	ITA	Giovanni Leoni
18	FW	NED	Cody Gakpo
21	DF	GRE	Kostas Tsimikas
22	FW	FRA	Hugo Ekitike

No.	Pos.	Nation	Player
23	FW	ESP	Víctor Muñoz
25	GK	GEO	Giorgi Mamardashvili
28	GK	ENG	Freddie Woodman
29	FW	FRA	Bradley Barcola
30	DF	NED	Jeremie Frimpong
33	DF	URU	Ronald Araújo (on loan from Barcelona)
38	MF	NED	Ryan Gravenberch
42	MF	ENG	Trey Nyoni
44	DF	ENG	Luke Chambers
53	MF	ENG	James McConnell
56	GK	CZE	Vítězslav Jaroš
67	FW	WAL	Lewis Koumas
73	FW	ENG	Rio Ngumoha
76	FW	ENG	Jayden Danns
95	GK	ENG	Harvey Davies

Out on loan

Note: Flags indicate national team as defined under FIFA eligibility rules; some limited exceptions apply. Players may hold more than one non-FIFA nationality.

No.	Pos.	Nation	Player
19	MF	ENG	Harvey Elliott (at Valencia until 30 June 2027)
41	GK	HUN	Ármin Pécsi (at TSV Hartberg until 30 June 2027)

No.	Pos.	Nation	Player
47	DF	SCO	Calvin Ramsay (at St Mirren until 31 May 2027)
83	DF	AUT	Ifeanyi Ndukwe (at Levante until 30 June 2027)

=== Reserves and Academy ===
Players with at least one first-team appearance for Liverpool.

Note: Flags indicate national team as defined under FIFA eligibility rules; some limited exceptions apply. Players may hold more than one non-FIFA nationality.

No.	Pos.	Nation	Player
49	FW	ENG	Kaide Gordon
52	DF	ZIM	Isaac Mabaya
63	DF	WAL	Owen Beck

No.	Pos.	Nation	Player
65	DF	ENG	Amara Nallo
92	DF	ENG	Wellity Lucky

Out on loan

Note: Flags indicate national team as defined under FIFA eligibility rules; some limited exceptions apply. Players may hold more than one non-FIFA nationality.

No.	Pos.	Nation	Player
48	DF	ENG	Calum Scanlon (at Cardiff City until 31 May 2027)
68	MF	NIR	Kieran Morrison (at Sheffield Wednesday until 31 May 2027)

=== Retired numbers ===
Since 11 July 2025, Liverpool have not issued the number 20 to any men's, women's, academy, or foundation squad player. It was retired in memory of Diogo Jota, who died in a car crash with his brother, André Silva in Cernadilla, Spain on 3 July 2025.

Note: Flags indicate national team as defined under FIFA eligibility rules; some limited exceptions apply. Players may hold more than one non-FIFA nationality.

No.	Pos.	Nation	Player
20	FW	POR	Diogo Jota (2020–25 – posthumous honour)

=== Club captains ===
Since the establishment of the club in 1892, 44 players have been club captain of Liverpool F.C. Andrew Hannah became the first captain of the club after Liverpool separated from Everton and formed its own club. Alex Raisbeck, who was club captain from 1899 to 1909, was the longest serving captain before being overtaken by Steven Gerrard who served 12 seasons starting from the 2003–04 season. The current captain is Virgil van Dijk, who has served since the beginning of the 2023–24 season.

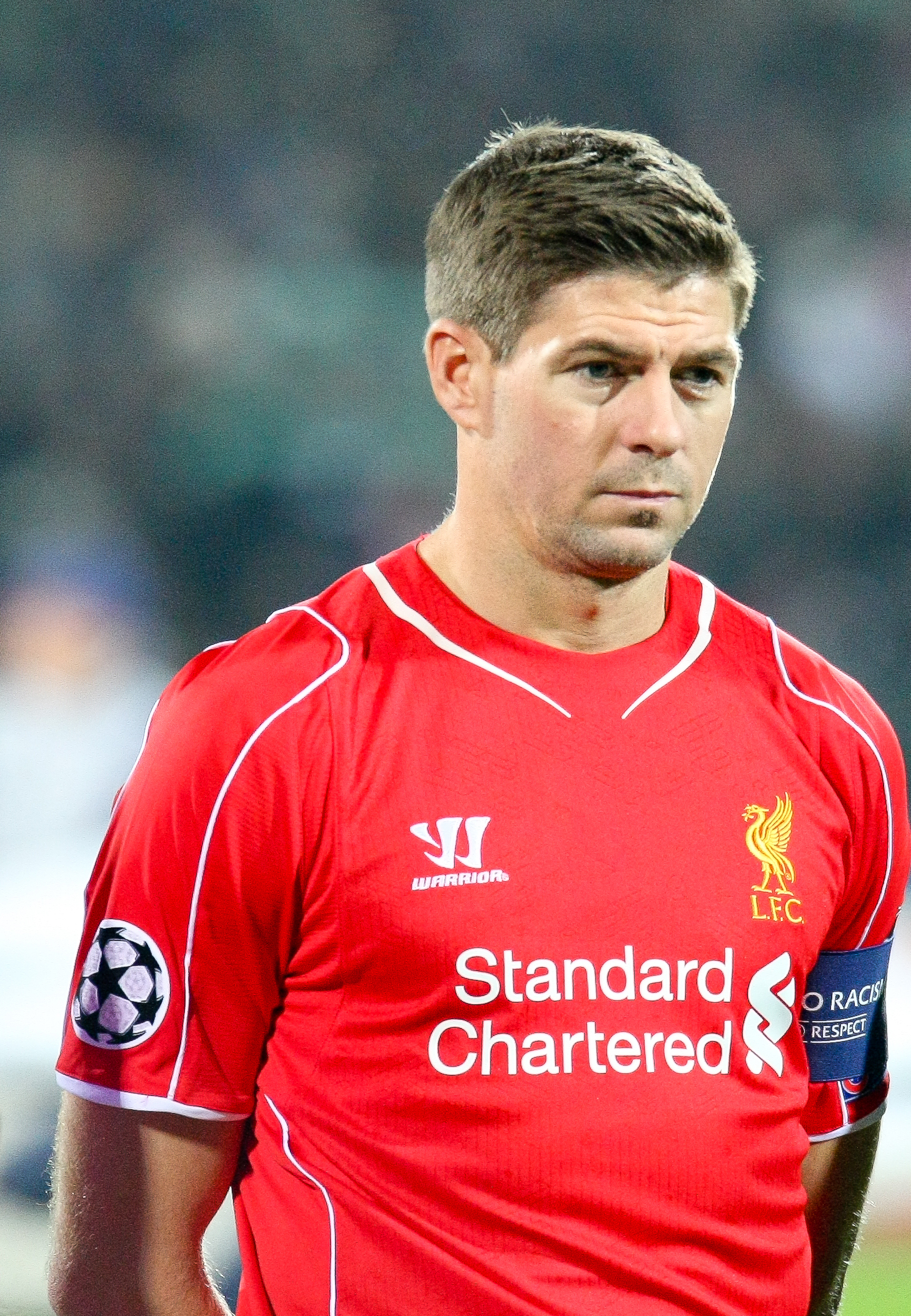
Steven Gerrard is Liverpool's longest-serving captain.

Name	Period
(Scotland) Andrew Hannah	1892–1895
(Scotland) Duncan McLean	1895
(Scotland) Jimmy Ross	1895–1897
(Scotland) John McCartney	1897–1898
(England) Harry Storer	1898–1899
(Scotland) George Allan	1899
(Scotland) Billy Dunlop	1899–1900
(Scotland) Alex Raisbeck	1900–1909
(England) Arthur Goddard	1909–1912
(England) Ephraim Longworth	1912–1913
(England) Harry Lowe	1913–1915
(England) Ephraim Longworth	1919–1922
(Scotland) Donald McKinlay	1922–1928
(England) Tom Bromilow	1928–1929
(Scotland) James Jackson	1929–1931
(Scotland) Tom Bradshaw	1931–1934
(England) Ernie Blenkinsop	1934–1937
(England) Tom Cooper	1937–1939
(Scotland) Matt Busby	1939–1940
(Scotland) Willie Fagan	1945–1947
(England) Jack Balmer	1947–1949
(England) Phil Taylor	1949–1953
(England) Bill Jones	1953–1954
(England) Laurie Hughes	1954–1955

Name	Period
(Scotland) Billy Liddell	1955–1958
(England) Johnny Wheeler	1958–1959
(England) Ronnie Moran	1959–1960
(England) Dick White	1960–1961
(Scotland) Ron Yeats	1961–1970
(England) Tommy Smith	1970–1973
(England) Emlyn Hughes	1973–1979
(England) Phil Thompson	1979–1981
(Scotland) Graeme Souness	1982–1984
(England) Phil Neal	1984–1985
(Scotland) Alan Hansen	1985–1988
(Republic of Ireland) Ronnie Whelan	1988–1989
(Scotland) Alan Hansen	1989–1990
(Republic of Ireland) Ronnie Whelan	1990–1991
(England) Mark Wright	1991–1993
(England) John Barnes	1993
(Wales) Ian Rush	1993–1996
(England) John Barnes	1996–1997
(England) Paul Ince	1997–1999
(England) Jamie Redknapp	1999–2002
(Finland) Sami Hyypiä	2002–2003
(England) Steven Gerrard	2003–2015
(England) Jordan Henderson	2015–2023
(Netherlands) Virgil van Dijk	2023–

== Club officials ==
- Owner: Fenway Sports Group, 1892 Holdings (Jeff Bezos, Amit Bhatia, Eduardo Saverin)
- Ambassadors: Ian Rush, Robbie Fowler, Michael Owen, John Barnes

=== Fenway Sports Group and FSG International ===
- Principal owner: John W. Henry
- Chairman: Tom Werner
- CEO of Football: Michael Gordon
- CEO of FSG International: Billy Hogan
- Managing Director: Andy Hughes
- Technical Director: Vacant
- Director of Football Development: Pedro Marques

=== Liverpool Football Club ===
- Directors: John W. Henry, Tom Werner, Michael Gordon, Michael Egan
- Sporting Director: Julian Ward
- Assistant Sporting Director: David Woodfine
- Non-Executive Director: Kenny Dalglish
- Director of Research: Will Spearman
- Head of Loan Management: Gary Probert
- Performance Consultant: Motonori Watanabe
- Head of Global Talent Manager: Kyle Wallbanks
- Head of Technical Scouting: Andrew O'Brien
- Scout: Sienna O'Brien, Mike Crompton, Kyle Wallbanks, Scott Russell, Raphael Cilento, Rachid Khlifi, Sven Dworaczek, Dominique Wolff
- Senior & Academy Scouting: Kiko Espinar
- Global Scout Talent: Tika Musonda, Stewart Downing
- Chief Scout: Barry Hunter

=== Coaching and medical staff ===
Head coach Andoni Iraola

- Head coach: Andoni Iraola
- Assistant coach: Pablo de la Torre
- First-team coach: Tommy Elphick, Shaun Cooper
- Individual lead coach: Luiz Fernando Iubel
- First-team goalkeeping coach: Alejandro Rosalen
- Goalkeeping development coach: Colin Stewart
- First-team doctor: Amit Pannu
- First-team physiotherapist: Robin Sadler
- First-team rehabilitation physiotherapist: David Breen
- Physiotherapist: Joe Lewis
- Director of medicine and performance: Jonathan Power
- Rehabiliation fitness coach: David Rydings
- Head of rehab physioteraphy: Lee Nobes
- Head of physical performance: Conall Murtagh
- Head of performance physical therapy: Chris Morgan
- Lead physical performance coach: Jack Ade
- Lead strength and conditioning coach: Chris Black
- Lead sports scientist: Matt Brown
- Lead performance nutritionist: Clare Farrell
- Health care assistant: Lynsey Ahmed
- Head of first-team analysis: Jansen Moreno
- First-team tactical analyst: Tom Webber
- First-team set-piece analyst: Lewis Mahoney
- First-team post-match analyst: Joel Bonner
- Physical performance analyst: Amber Rowell
- Masseur: Paul Small, Michelle Hudson
- Kit assistant: Yinka Ademuyiwa
- Kit co-ordinator: Brendan McIlduff

== Honours ==
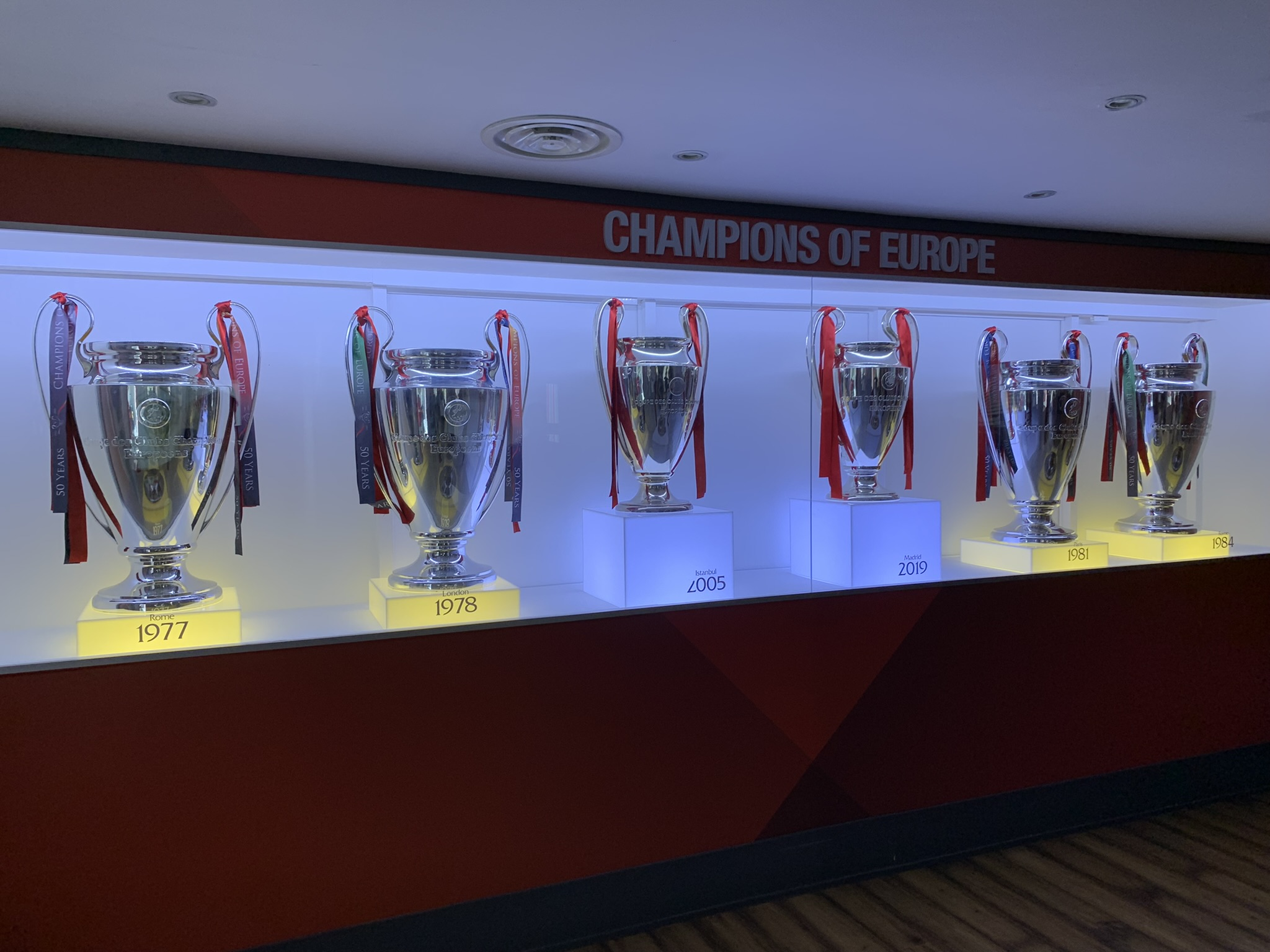
The six European Cups Liverpool won from 1977 to 2019 on display in the club's museum

In terms of the number of trophies won, Liverpool is regarded as the most successful club in English football. Liverpool's first trophy was the Lancashire League, which it won in the club's first season. In 1901, the club won its first League title, while the record-equalling twentieth and most recent was in 2025. Meanwhile, the club's first success in the FA Cup came in 1965. In the 1980s, Liverpool had its most successful decade, when the club won six League titles, two FA Cups, four League Cups, one Football League Super Cup, five Charity Shields (one shared) and two European Cups. In 2020, Liverpool became the first English club to have won a League title in eight different decades.

The club has accumulated more top-flight wins and points than any other English team. Liverpool also has the highest average league finishing position (3.3) for the 50-year period from 1965 to 2015, and second-highest average league finishing position for the period 1900–1999 after Arsenal, with an average league placing of 8.7.

Liverpool is the most successful British club in international football with fourteen trophies, having won the European Cup/UEFA Champions League (UEFA's premier club competition) six times, an English record that is only surpassed by Real Madrid and AC Milan. Liverpool's fifth European Cup win, in 2005, meant that the club was awarded the trophy permanently and was also awarded a multiple-winner badge. Liverpool also hold the English record of three wins in the UEFA Cup, UEFA's secondary club competition. Liverpool also hold the English record of four wins in the UEFA Super Cup. In 2019, the club won the FIFA Club World Cup for the first time, and also became the first English club to win the international treble of the Champions League, UEFA Super Cup and Club World Cup.

Liverpool FC honours
Type	Competition	Titles	Seasons
Domestic	First Division/Premier League (Note: Upon its formation in 1992, the Premier League became the top tier of English football; the Football League First and Second Divisions then became the second and third tiers, respectively. From 2004, the First Division became the Championship and the Second Division became League One.)	20^{s}	1900–01, 1905–06, 1921–22, 1922–23, 1946–47, 1963–64, 1965–66, 1972–73, 1975–76, 1976–77, 1978–79, 1979–80, 1981–82, 1982–83, 1983–84, 1985–86, 1987–88, 1989–90, 2019–20, 2024–25
Domestic	Second Division	4	1893–94, 1895–96, 1904–05, 1961–62
Domestic	FA Cup	8	1964–65, 1973–74, 1985–86, 1988–89, 1991–92, 2000–01, 2005–06, 2021–22
Domestic	Football League Cup/EFL Cup	10	1980–81, 1981–82, 1982–83, 1983–84, 1994–95, 2000–01, 2002–03, 2011–12, 2021–22, 2023–24
Domestic	FA Charity Shield/FA Community Shield	16	1964*, 1965*, 1966, 1974, 1976, 1977*, 1979, 1980, 1982, 1986*, 1988, 1989, 1990*, 2001, 2006, 2022 (* shared)
Domestic	Football League Super Cup	1	1985–86
Continental	European Cup/UEFA Champions League	6	1976–77, 1977–78, 1980–81, 1983–84, 2004–05, 2018–19
Continental	UEFA Cup/UEFA Europa League	3	1972–73, 1975–76, 2000–01
Continental	UEFA Super Cup	4	1977, 2001, 2005, 2019
Worldwide	FIFA Club World Cup	1	2019

- record
- ^{s} shared record

=== Minor titles ===
- Lancashire League
  - Winners (1): 1892–93
- Sheriff of London Charity Shield
  - Winners (1): 1906

=== Doubles and trebles ===
- Doubles: (Note: Doubles won in conjunction with the treble, such as the FA Cup and League Cup double in 2001, are not included in the Doubles section.)
  - League and FA Cup (1): 1985–86
  - League and League Cup (2): 1981–82, 1982–83
  - League and European Cup (2): 1976–77, 1983–84
  - League and UEFA Cup (2): 1972–73, 1975–76
  - League Cup and European Cup (1): 1980–81
  - FA Cup and League Cup (1): 2021–22
- Trebles:
  - League, League Cup and European Cup (1): 1983–84
  - FA Cup, League Cup and UEFA Cup (1): 2000–01

== Bibliography ==
- Cox, Richard; Russell, Dave; Vamplew, Wray (2002). Encyclopedia of British football. Routledge. ISBN 0-7146-5249-0.
- Crilly, Peter (2007). Tops of the Kops: The Complete Guide to Liverpool's Kits. Trinity Mirror Sport Media. ISBN 978-1-905266-22-7.
- Graham, Matthew (1985). Liverpool. Hamlyn Publishing Group. ISBN 0-600-50254-6.
- Kelly, Stephen F. (1999). The Boot Room Boys: Inside the Anfield Boot Room. HarperCollins. ISBN 0-00-218907-0.
- Kelly, Stephen F. (1988). You'll Never Walk Alone. Queen Anne Press. ISBN 0-356-19594-5.
- Liversedge, Stan (1991). Liverpool:The Official Centenary History. Hamlyn Publishing Group. ISBN 0-600-57308-7.
- Moynihan, Leo (2009). The Pocket Book of Liverpool. Turnaround Publisher Services. ISBN 978-1-905326-62-4.
- Pead, Brian (1986). Liverpool A Complete Record. Breedon Books. ISBN 0-907969-15-1.
- Reade, Brian (2009). 43 Years with the Same Bird. Pan. ISBN 978-1-74329-366-9.
