= Vehicle registration plates of Massachusetts =

Massachusetts vehicle license plates

Massachusetts
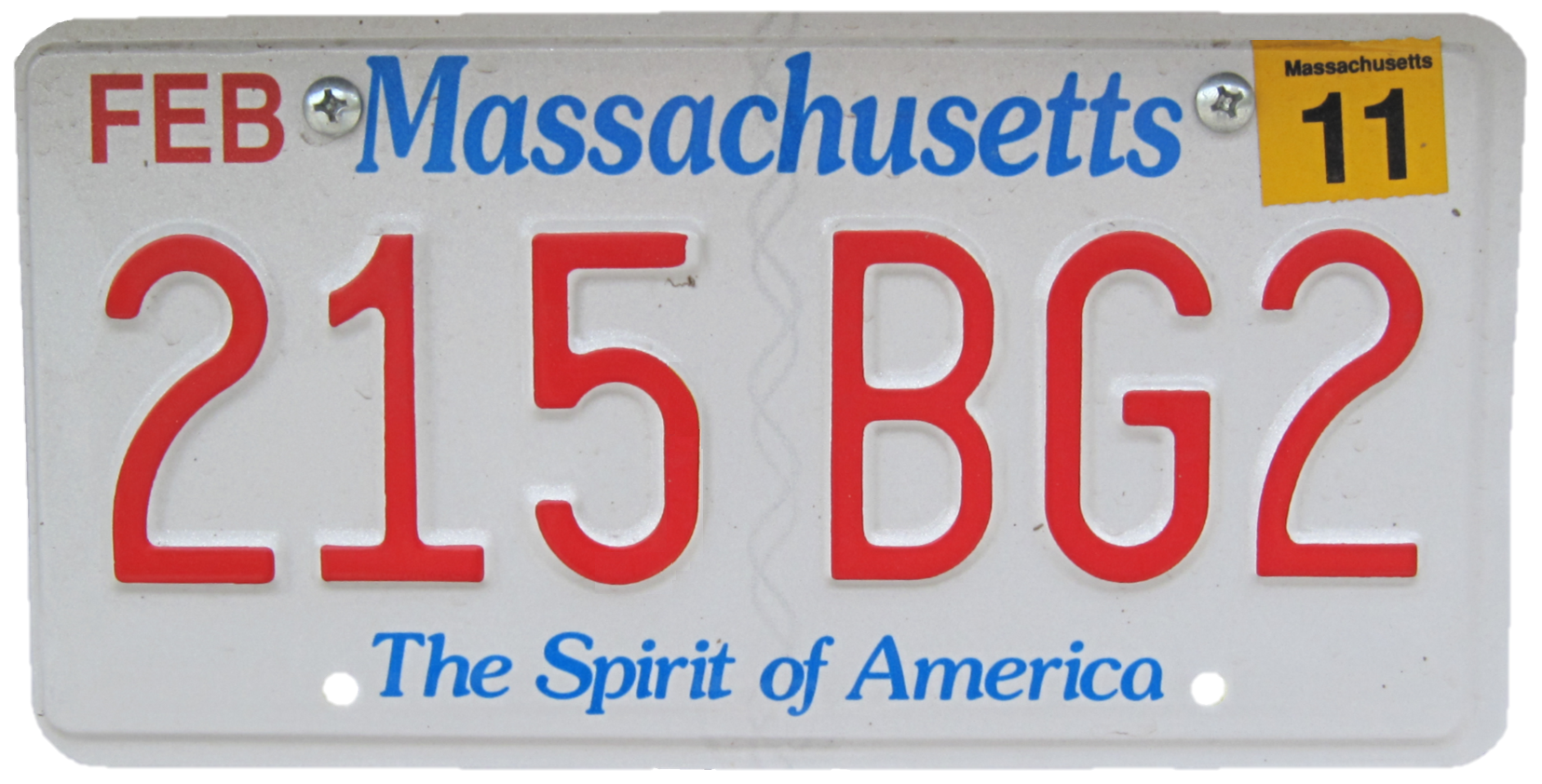

Current series
- Slogan: The Spirit of America
- Size: 12 in × 6 in 30 cm × 15 cm
- Material: Aluminum
- Serial format: Current: 1ABC 23; Former: 123 ABC; 1234 AB; 12A B34; 123 AB4; 1AB 234; 1ABC 20; 12A 340; 123 A40 (Coded by month)
- Introduced: 1987 (vanity plates and some non-passenger types; used as standard passenger base from 1993 onwards)

Availability
- Issued by: Massachusetts Department of Transportation, Registry of Motor Vehicles

History
- First issued: September 1, 1903, to Frederick Tudor

Massachusetts was the first U.S. state to issue license plates on September 1, 1903. As of 2026, plates are issued by the Massachusetts Registry of Motor Vehicles (RMV).

All plates since 1978 are valid. Prior to 1993, only rear plates were required; since the first "Spirit of America" plate was issued in 1986, front and rear plates have been required since. As such, the 1978-1993 issues continue to only require the rear plate, while the "Spirit of America" issues since 1986 require front and rear plates.

The very first Massachusetts license plate, "1", is still in use today. It was issued to Frederick Tudor, who also received the first license issued. He got the plate due to his work for the Massachusetts Highway Commission and his connection as the nephew of the wealthy Henry Lee Higginson, whose irritation with cars speeding by his estate led to him successfully petitioning for the state of Massachusetts to register all motor vehicles (previously, only the city of Boston had this requirement). This was the first license plate in the United States. His descendants have kept the plate registered and in use within the family.

== Passenger baseplates ==
=== 1903 to 1966 ===
In 1956, the United States, Canada, and Mexico came to an agreement with the American Association of Motor Vehicle Administrators, the Automobile Manufacturers Association and the National Safety Council that standardized the size for license plates for vehicles (except those for motorcycles) at 6 inches (15 cm) in height by 12 inches (30 cm) in width, with standardized mounting holes. The 1955 (dated 1956) issue was the first Massachusetts license plate that complied with these standards.

Image	Dates issued	Design	Serial format	Serials issued	Notes
	1903–07	White serial on blue porcelain plate; "MASS. AUTOMOBILE REGISTER" at top	12345	1 to 26207	
	1908	Blue serial on white porcelain plate; vertical "MASS" and "1908" at left and right respectively	12345	1 to approximately 17500	First dated plate.
	1909	White serial on blue porcelain plate; vertical "MASS" and "1909" at left and right respectively	12345	1 to approximately 23500	
	1910	Blue serial on white porcelain plate; vertical "MASS" and "1910" at left and right respectively	12345	1 to approximately 29000	
12345	1911	White serial on blue porcelain plate; vertical "MASS" and "1911" at left and right respectively	12345	1 to approximately 33000	
	1912	Blue serial on white porcelain plate; vertical "MASS" and "1912" at left and right respectively	12345	1 to approximately 41000	
	1913	White serial on blue porcelain plate; vertical "MASS" and "1913" at left and right respectively	12345	1 to approximately 54500	
	1914	Blue serial on white porcelain plate; vertical "MASS" and "1914" at left and right respectively	12345	1 to approximately 62000	
	1915	White serial on blue porcelain plate; vertical "MASS" and "1915" at left and right respectively	12345	1 to approximately 79500	
	1916	Dark blue serial on cream flat metal plate; vertical "MASS" and "1916" at left and right respectively	123456	1 to approximately 102000	First plate to use tin instead of iron.
	1917	Cream serial on dark blue flat metal plate; "MASS. 1917" centered at bottom	123,456	1 to approximately 127,000	
	1918	Dark blue serial on cream flat metal plate; "MASS. 1918" centered at bottom	123,456	1 to approximately 142,000	
123,456	1919	Cream serial on dark blue flat metal plate; "MASS. 1919" centered at bottom	123,456	1 to approximately 177,000	Last plate to use tin.
	1920	Embossed dark blue serial on white plate; "MASS. 1920" centered at bottom	123,456	1 to approximately 219,000	First embossed plate.
	1921	Embossed white serial on dark blue plate; "MASS. 1921" centered at bottom	123,456	1 to approximately 260,000	
123,456	1922	As 1920 base, but with "MASS. 1922" at bottom	123,456	1 to approximately 321,000	
123,456	1923	As 1921 base, but with "MASS. 1923" at bottom	123,456	1 to approximately 402,000	
	1924	Embossed white serial on maroon plate; "MASS. 1924" centered at bottom	123,456	1 to approximately 473,000	
123,456	1925	Embossed white serial on black plate; "MASS. — 1925" at bottom	123,456	1 to approximately 546,000	
123,456	1926	Embossed white serial on blue plate; "1926 — MASS" at bottom	123,456	1 to approximately 598,000	
	1927	Embossed white serial on maroon plate; "MASS — 1927" at bottom	123,456	1 to approximately 624,000	
	1928	Embossed white serial on green plate; "1928", cod fish graphic and "MASS" at bottom	123,456	1 to approximately 644,000	Removed due to superstition cod fish facing away from "MASS" led to bad fishing harvest.
	1929	Embossed white serial on blue plate; "MASS — 1929" at bottom and occasional cod graphic	123,456	1 to approximately 712,000	
	1930	Embossed white serial on maroon plate; "1930 — MASS" at bottom	123,456	1 to approximately 749,000	
123,456	1931	Embossed white serial on green plate; "MASS — 1931" at bottom	123,456	1 to approximately 792,000	
123,456	1932	As 1930 base, but with "1932 — MASS" at bottom	123,456	1 to approximately 740,000	
123,456	1933	As 1931 base, but with "MASS — 1933" at bottom	123,456	1 to approximately 759,000	
123,456	1934	As 1930 base, but with "MASS — 1934" at bottom	123,456	1 to approximately 749,000	
	1935	As 1931 base, but with "1935 — MASS" at bottom	123,456	1 to approximately 734,000	
123,456	1936	Embossed white serial on maroon plate; "MASS 36" centered at top	123,456	1 to approximately 729,000	
123,456	1937	Embossed white serial on green plate; "37 MASS" centered at top	123,456	1 to approximately 755,000	
	1938	Embossed white serial on maroon plate; "MASS 38" centered at bottom	123·456	1 to approximately 751·000	
123·456	1939	Embossed white serial on green plate; "39 MASS" centered at bottom	123·456	1 to approximately 771·000	
	1940	Embossed white serial on maroon plate; "MASS 40" centered at top	123·456	1 to approximately 779·000	
	1941	Embossed white serial on green plate; "41 MASS" centered at bottom	123·456	1 to approximately 852·000	
	1942–44	Embossed white serial on maroon plate; "MASS 42" centered at bottom	123·456	1 to approximately 828·000	Revalidated for 1943 and 1944 with wind- shield stickers, due to metal conservation for World War II.
123·456	1942–44	As above, but green rather than maroon	123·456	828·001 to approximately 855·000	Revalidated for 1943 and 1944 with wind- shield stickers, due to metal conservation for World War II.
	1945	Embossed white serial on dark blue plate; "45 MASS" at top	123·456	1 to approximately 799·000	
	1946	Embossed white serial on black plate; "46 MASS" at bottom	123·456	1 to approximately 843·000	
	1947	Embossed white serial on dark green plate; "MASS 47" within embossed white bar centered at top	123·456	1 to approximately 897·000	
	1948	Embossed white serial on maroon plate; "48 MASS" within embossed white bar centered at bottom	123·456	1 to approximately 948·000	
No image	1949–50	Embossed white serial on black plate; "49 MASS" within embossed white bar centered at top	123·456	1 to 999·999	Revalidated for 1950 with windshield sticker.
No image	1949–50	Embossed white serial on black plate; "49 MASS" within embossed white bar centered at top	A12·345	K, H and J series	Revalidated for 1950 with windshield sticker.
	1951–52	Embossed white serial on maroon plate; "MASS 51" within embossed white bar centered at bottom	123·456	1 to 999·999	Revalidated for 1952 with windshield sticker.
	1951–52	Embossed white serial on maroon plate; "MASS 51" within embossed white bar centered at bottom	A12·345	K, H, E and P series	Revalidated for 1952 with windshield sticker.
	1953–54	Embossed white serial on black plate; "MASS 53" within embossed white bar centered at top	123·456	1 to 999·999	Revalidated for 1954 with windshield sticker.
	1953–54	Embossed white serial on black plate; "MASS 53" within embossed white bar centered at top	A12·345	K, H, E, P and L series	Revalidated for 1954 with windshield sticker.
No image	1955–56	Embossed white serial on maroon plate; "55 MASS" within embossed white bar centered at bottom	123·456	1 to 999·999	Revalidated for 1956 with windshield sticker.
No image	1955–56	Embossed white serial on maroon plate; "55 MASS" within embossed white bar centered at bottom	A12·345	K, H, E, P, L, N and X series	Revalidated for 1956 with windshield sticker.
	1957–58	Embossed white serial on black plate with border line; "MASS 57" within embossed white bar centered at top	123·456	1 to 999·999	First 6" x 12" plate. Revalidated for 1958 with windshield sticker.
	1957–58	Embossed white serial on black plate with border line; "MASS 57" within embossed white bar centered at top	A12·345	K, H, E, P, L, N, X and U series	First 6" x 12" plate. Revalidated for 1958 with windshield sticker.
	1959–60	Embossed white serial on maroon plate with border line; "59 MASS" within embossed white bar centered at top	123·456; A12·345		Revalidated for 1960 with windshield sticker.
	1961–62	Embossed white serial on dark green plate with border line; "MASS 61" within embossed white bar centered at top	123·456; A12·345		Revalidated for 1962 with windshield sticker.
	1963	Embossed white serial on black plate with border line; "63 MASS" within embossed white bar centered at top	123·456; A12·345		Substandard paint used, plates needed refurbishing.
	1964–65	Embossed white serial on maroon plate with border line; "MASS 64" within embossed white bar centered at top	123·456; A12·345		Revalidated for 1965 with windshield sticker.
	1966	Embossed white serial on dark green plate with border line; "66 MASS" within embossed white bar centered at top	123·456; A12·345		

=== 1967 to present ===
Massachusetts implemented a monthly staggered registration system in 1969. Since then, serials on passenger plates have been coded by the month of expiration of the registration, determined by the last number in the serial (1 for January, 2 for February and so on up to 0 for October). From 1969 through 1977, serials with 'X' suffixes were used for November and 'Y' suffixes for December expirations respectively. Registrants are issued plates expiring the last day of the previous month (e.g. a motorist registering a vehicle in June will be issued May plates). If a vehicle is registered in December or January (so that November and December plates would be called for), leftover plates are issued from other months with manufacturing overruns.

Two-year registrations are mandatory, with the exception of vehicles initially registered during December or January. Vanity plates and motorcycle plates must be renewed annually. All apportioned plate registrations expire on June 30, all trailer and "Spirit of America" vanity plate registrations expire on November 30, and all motorcycle, commercial, and single letter passenger reserved plate registrations expire on December 31.

Currently, the Livery plate is the only common license plate in Massachusetts that is allowed to have more than six characters in its serials. All Livery plate serials start with the letters "LV", even if not stamped.

Because the RMV utilizes "Plate Type" to describe the type of registration, it is theoretically possible to have two plates issued with seemingly the same serial. Some of the plate types, and their three-letter codes, are listed below:

- PAN - Passenger: Normal
- PAR - Passenger: Reserved
- PAS - Passenger: Specialty (Antique, Veteran, Environmental, Sports, Spay & Neuter, Breast Cancer, United We Stand, etc.)
- PAV - Passenger: Vanity
- PAY - Passenger: Year of Manufacture (Antique plate with year stamped; AN gets added to the beginning of plate number on registration)
- CON - Commercial: Normal (plates starting SR are for snow removal; HR for Hearse)
- COR - Commercial: Reserved
- COV - Commercial: Vanity
- MCN - Motorcycle: Normal
- MCR - Motorcycle: Reserved
- MCS - Motorcycle: Specialty
- MCV - Motorcycle: Vanity
- AHN - Camper: Normal
- AHR - Camper: Reserved
- AHV - Camper: Vanity
- AMN - Ambulance: Normal (includes Animal Ambulance)
- AMR - Ambulance: Reserved
- LVN - Livery: Normal
- LVR - Livery: Reserved
- LVV - Livery: Vanity
- SPN - School Pupil: Normal
- TAN - Taxi: Normal
- TAR - Taxi: Reserved
- TRN - Trailer: Normal (not used on Camper trailers)
- TRR - Trailer: Reserved
- VPN - Van Pool: Normal
- SBN - School Bus: Normal
- SBR - School Bus: Reserved
- BUN - Bus: Normal
- BUR - Bus: Reserved
- BUV - Bus: Vanity

Image	Dates issued	Design	Serial format	Serials issued	Notes
	1967–68	Embossed blue serial on reflective white plate with border line; "MASSACHUSETTS" centered at top	123·456	100·001 to 999·999	Revalidated with windshield stickers through the end of 1969, then coded by month of expiration (see above) and revalidated with plate stickers.
	1967–68	Embossed blue serial on reflective white plate with border line; "MASSACHUSETTS" centered at top	A12·345	E10·001 to Y99·999	Revalidated with windshield stickers through the end of 1969, then coded by month of expiration (see above) and revalidated with plate stickers.
	1969–71	Embossed blue serial on reflective white plate with border line; "MASSACHUSETTS" centered at top	123·45A	Coded by month of expiration	Revalidated with plate stickers. All plates replaced 1972–73.
	1972–78	Embossed red serial on reflective white plate with border line; "MASSACHUSETTS" centered at bottom	1A·2345; 12A·340; 123·456; A12·345; 123·45A	Coded by month of expiration	12A·340 serial format used only on plates expiring in October. Issued in alternating weeks from 1977, following the introduction of the green-on-white base (below), until supplies were exhausted. Replaced 1982–83.
	1977–93	Embossed green serial on reflective white plate with border line; "MASSACHUSETTS" centered at top	123·ABC	100·AAA to 999·VZZ (see right)	Only rear plates issued (except for reserved and non-passenger plates). On all plates, the last digit corresponded to the month of expiration, with November and December expirations discontinued except on non-passenger plates and on red-and-white plates until 1980–81. All-numeric plates were generally issued to holders of the same serials on the red-on-white base. Still currently revalidated.
	1983–93	Embossed green serial on reflective white plate with border line; "MASSACHUSETTS" centered at top	123·456	100·000 to 999·999 (see right)	Only rear plates issued (except for reserved and non-passenger plates). On all plates, the last digit corresponded to the month of expiration, with November and December expirations discontinued except on non-passenger plates and on red-and-white plates until 1980–81. All-numeric plates were generally issued to holders of the same serials on the red-on-white base. Still currently revalidated.
	1993–present	Embossed red serial on reflective white plate; "Massachusetts" and "The Spirit of America" screened in blue centered at top and bottom respectively	123·ABC	999·ZZZ to 100·WAA (reverse issue)	This base was first issued in 1987 for vanity plates and some non-passenger types, before becoming the standard passenger base in 1993. On all standard passenger plates, the last digit corresponds to the month of expiration. Digit 1 became serifed in March 2005. Letters Q and U never used. Letters I and O used in 123·ABC and 1234 AB formats (IA-IZ, OA-OZ were skipped)
	1993–present	Embossed red serial on reflective white plate; "Massachusetts" and "The Spirit of America" screened in blue centered at top and bottom respectively	1234 AB	1000 AA to 9999 AA, then 1000 AB through 9999 AZ and so on through 9999 ZZ (January issued only through 9991 TZ, February issued only through 9992 YZ)	This base was first issued in 1987 for vanity plates and some non-passenger types, before becoming the standard passenger base in 1993. On all standard passenger plates, the last digit corresponds to the month of expiration. Digit 1 became serifed in March 2005. Letters Q and U never used. Letters I and O used in 123·ABC and 1234 AB formats (IA-IZ, OA-OZ were skipped)
	1993–present	Embossed red serial on reflective white plate; "Massachusetts" and "The Spirit of America" screened in blue centered at top and bottom respectively	12A B34	10A A00 to 99A A09, then 10A B00 through 99A Z09, then 10B A00 through 99Z Z09 and so on through 99Z Z99 (May issued only through 99Z Z85, June issued only through 99Z Z86)	This base was first issued in 1987 for vanity plates and some non-passenger types, before becoming the standard passenger base in 1993. On all standard passenger plates, the last digit corresponds to the month of expiration. Digit 1 became serifed in March 2005. Letters Q and U never used. Letters I and O used in 123·ABC and 1234 AB formats (IA-IZ, OA-OZ were skipped)
	1993–present	Embossed red serial on reflective white plate; "Massachusetts" and "The Spirit of America" screened in blue centered at top and bottom respectively	123 AB4	111 AA0 to 999 AA9, then 111 AB0 through 999 AZ9 and so on through 999 ZZ9 (October issued only through 999 NZ0 to avoid any further confusion with the previous 123·ABO format)	This base was first issued in 1987 for vanity plates and some non-passenger types, before becoming the standard passenger base in 1993. On all standard passenger plates, the last digit corresponds to the month of expiration. Digit 1 became serifed in March 2005. Letters Q and U never used. Letters I and O used in 123·ABC and 1234 AB formats (IA-IZ, OA-OZ were skipped)
	1993–present	Embossed red serial on reflective white plate; "Massachusetts" and "The Spirit of America" screened in blue centered at top and bottom respectively	1AB 234	1AA 110 to 9ZZ 999	This base was first issued in 1987 for vanity plates and some non-passenger types, before becoming the standard passenger base in 1993. On all standard passenger plates, the last digit corresponds to the month of expiration. Digit 1 became serifed in March 2005. Letters Q and U never used. Letters I and O used in 123·ABC and 1234 AB formats (IA-IZ, OA-OZ were skipped)
	1993–present	Embossed red serial on reflective white plate; "Massachusetts" and "The Spirit of America" screened in blue centered at top and bottom respectively	1ABC 23	As of May 25, 2026: 1AAA 11 to at least 6ZZL 51; 1AAA 12 to at least 6NZT 22; 1AAA 13 to at least 7JLY 83; 1AAA 14 to at least 6YTP 94; 1AAA 15 to 5YLZ 95; 1AAA 16 to 5GZZ 96; 1AAA 17 to 7CZZ 97; 1AAA 18 to 6XZZ 98; 1AAA 29 to 7DZZ 99; 1AAA 10 to 9RZZ 90 (9SAA 10 to 9ZZZ 90 were not used and October was moved on to the below formats in November 2018)	This base was first issued in 1987 for vanity plates and some non-passenger types, before becoming the standard passenger base in 1993. On all standard passenger plates, the last digit corresponds to the month of expiration. Digit 1 became serifed in March 2005. Letters Q and U never used. Letters I and O used in 123·ABC and 1234 AB formats (IA-IZ, OA-OZ were skipped)
	1993–present	Embossed red serial on reflective white plate; "Massachusetts" and "The Spirit of America" screened in blue centered at top and bottom respectively	12A 340	11A 100 to 99Z 990 (October only)	This base was first issued in 1987 for vanity plates and some non-passenger types, before becoming the standard passenger base in 1993. On all standard passenger plates, the last digit corresponds to the month of expiration. Digit 1 became serifed in March 2005. Letters Q and U never used. Letters I and O used in 123·ABC and 1234 AB formats (IA-IZ, OA-OZ were skipped)
	1993–present	Embossed red serial on reflective white plate; "Massachusetts" and "The Spirit of America" screened in blue centered at top and bottom respectively	123 A40	111 A10 to 479 Z90 (October only)	This base was first issued in 1987 for vanity plates and some non-passenger types, before becoming the standard passenger base in 1993. On all standard passenger plates, the last digit corresponds to the month of expiration. Digit 1 became serifed in March 2005. Letters Q and U never used. Letters I and O used in 123·ABC and 1234 AB formats (IA-IZ, OA-OZ were skipped)

== Current passenger base plates ==
Currently, both the 1977 green-on-white base and the 1987 "Spirit" base are valid for registration. On the 1977 base, only rear plates were issued for most types (except for Reserved, Commercial and Taxi, for which front plates were also issued and must also be displayed today), whereas on the current "Spirit" base, both front and rear plates are issued. Registrants with 1977 plates have the option of replacing these with "Spirit" plates at no charge (though a different number will be used); however, most choose to keep their 1977 plates as a point of pride. In many cases, the 1977 plates are worn and illegible; legally per M.G.L. Chapter 90, a car with an illegible plate (regardless of age or color) must fail the state's annually required vehicle safety inspection. This is a safety fail, which under Massachusetts law prohibits operation of the vehicle until the issue is corrected.

Image	First year of issue	Description	Serials previously issued	Current serial format	Notes
	1987	Red on reflective white base with screened state name and slogan in blue	Coded with n by month of expiration (1 through 9 for January through September, 0 for October): 123·45n; 12n·ABC; 123n AB; 12A B3n; 123 ABn; 1AB 23n; 1ABC 20 (October expirations, other months are currently following); 12A 340 (October expirations only, although other months might follow)	Coded with n by month of expiration (1 through 9 for January through September, 0 for October): 1ABC 2n (January through September expirations); 123 A40 (October expirations only, although other months might follow)	Letters Q and U never used. Letters I and O used in 123·ABC and 1234 AB formats (IA-IZ, OA-OZ were skipped)

== Reserved plates ==
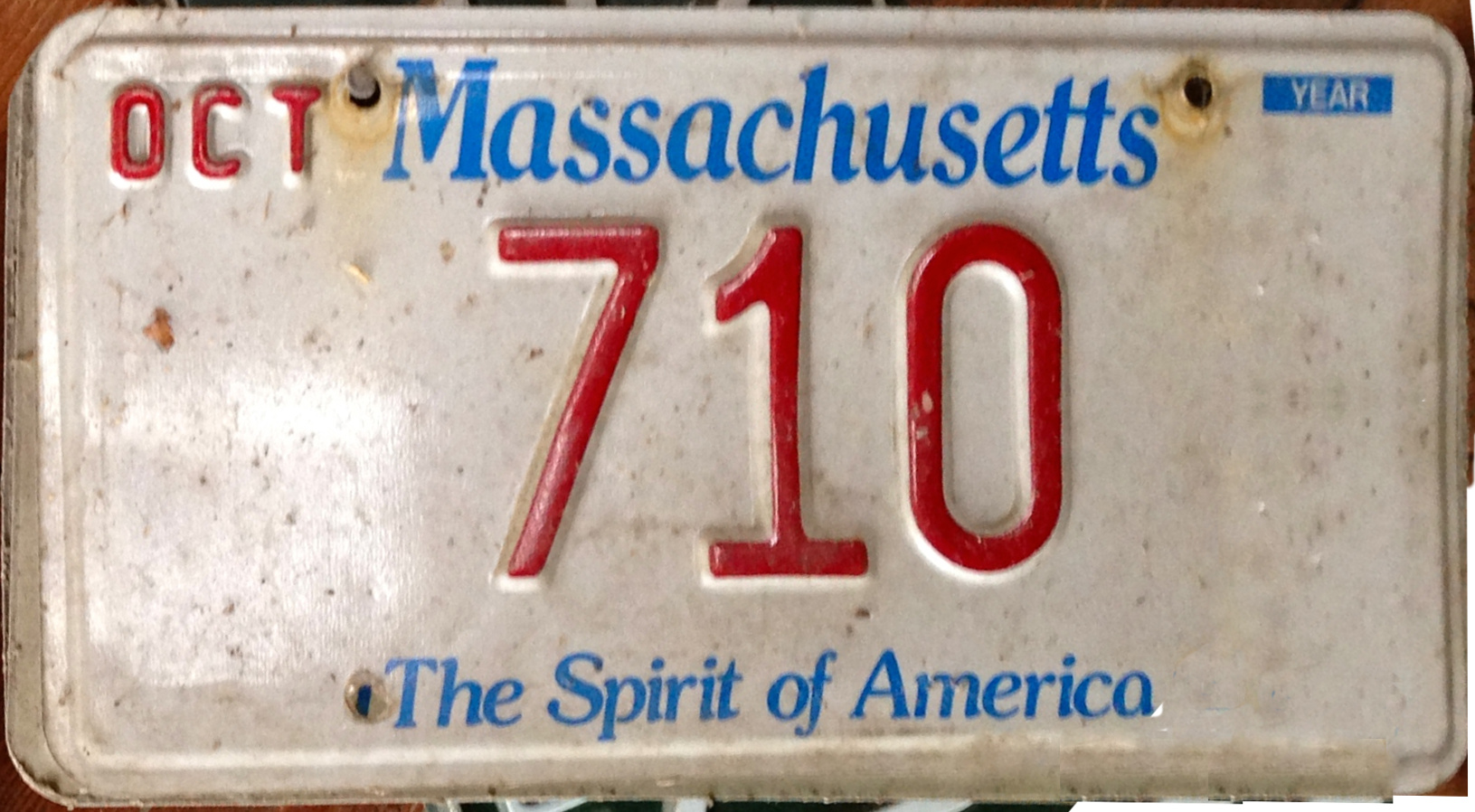
"Spirit of America" low-number reserve plate.

In addition to the standard serial formats, Massachusetts also issues "reserve" plates. Reserve plates permit the plate holder to receive the same serial number when new plate styles are issued, or to transfer the serial number to family members. These plates are either all-numeric (1 through 99999) or consist of a single letter followed or preceded by a number (A 1 through Z 9999 and 1 A through 9999 Z). Reserve serials may also be of the forms A (expires on December 31), A#A, A##A, #A#, and #AA#, where # represents any number, and A represents any letter. Low-number reserve plates – now called "Lottery Plates" by the RMV – are of the forms A, #, ##, ###, ####, A #, A ##, # A, and ## A only. When a registrant cancels a low-number reserve registration, the number is placed in an annual lottery. Registration for the lottery generally begins each June, and the drawing must be held by September 15. Prior to the institution of this annual lottery in 1987, low-number reserve plates were issued only to well-connected individuals, and it is widely believed that drivers with low registration numbers were given preferential treatment by law enforcement. Joseph Alecks, a former state comptroller, told the Boston Globe that year that "Years back, those low-number plates had status, because you figure you can park anywhere and a cop wouldn't tag you because they thought you had some influence." The annual lottery was instituted by governor Michael Dukakis in response to complaints about the politics behind the issuance of low-number registrations. As with standard registration plates, the final digit on low-number reserve plates indicates the month of expiration.

Image	First year of issue	Description	Serial formats	Notes
	1987	Low-number reserve: Red on reflective white base with screened state name and slogan in blue	Coded with n by month of expiration (1 through 9 for January through September, 0 for October): A (expires on December 31).; n; 1n; 12n; 123n; 1234n*; A n**; A 1n**; A 12n*; A 123n*; n A***; 1n A***; 12n A*; 123n A*; AnB*; A1nB*; 1An*; 1ABn*	* No longer available via lottery. ** No longer uses the letter O. *** Never used the letter O.

== Vanity plates ==
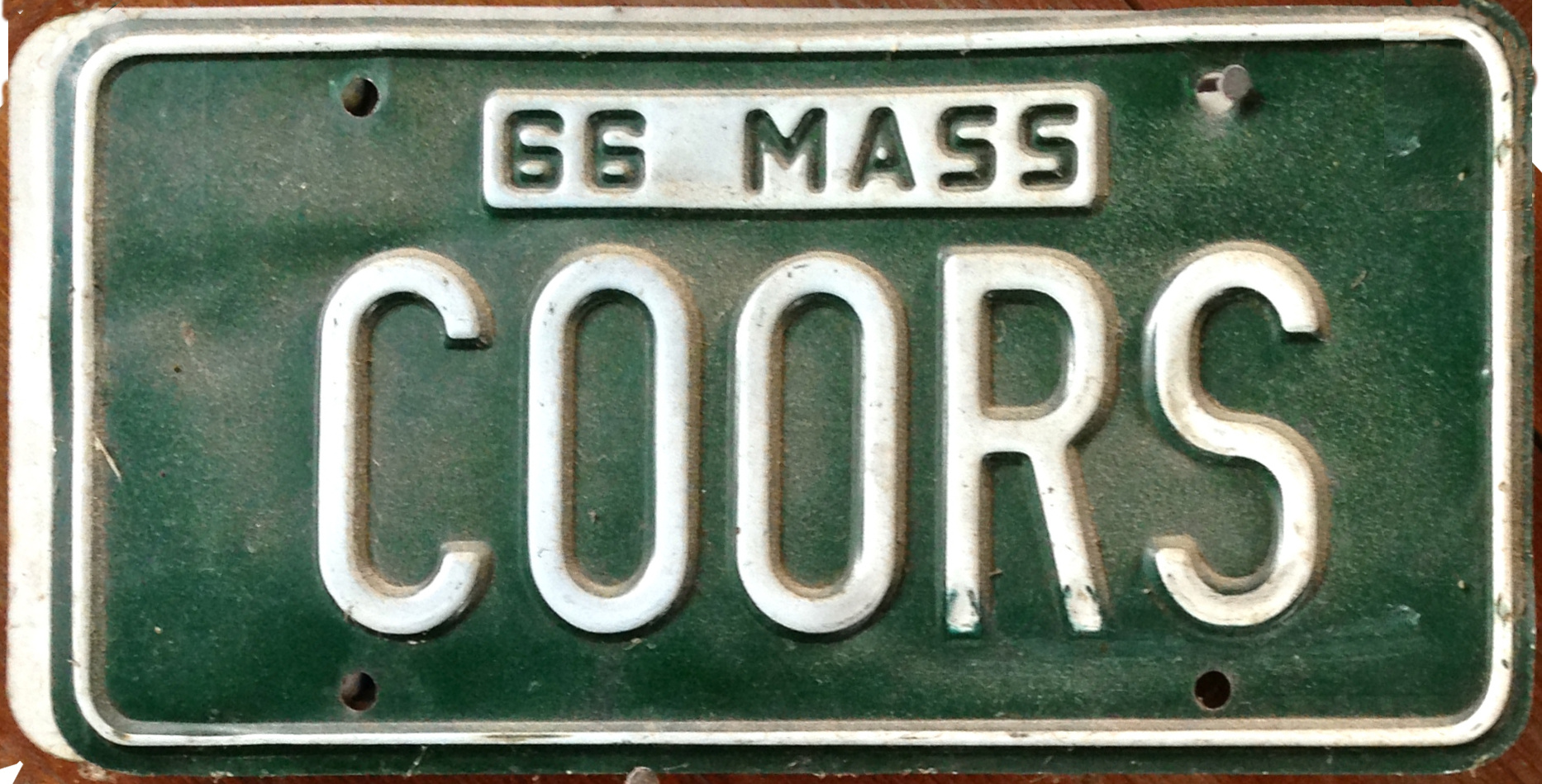
1966 vanity plate. Serials featuring the names of alcoholic beverages are no longer permitted.

Image	First year of issue	Design	Allowed serial formats	Notes
	1987	Red on reflective white base with screened state name and slogan in blue	AB; AB 1; AB 12; AB 123; AB 1234; ABC; ABC 1; ABC 12; ABC 123; ABCD; ABCD 1; ABCD 12; ABCDE; ABCDE 1; ABCDEF	All passenger vanity plates expire on November 30.

== Charitable Organization Plates ==
In general, Massachusetts specialty plates follow the formats of X/X 1234, progressing to X/X 123A, X/X 12AB, X/X AB12, X/X A123.

Specialty plates cost an additional $40 every two years, for a total registration cost of $100. Upon initial registration, the special plate fee is divided into $12 for manufacturing and $28 for the organization featured on the plate. For the “Cape and Islands” and “Olympic Spirit” plates, a $50 special plate fee is divided into $16 for manufacturing and $34 for the organization featured on the plate, for a total registration cost of $110. The charity receives the full special plate fee upon renewal of registration.

Image	Type	Dates issued	Design	Serial Prefix	Serials issued	Notes
	ALS One	2016 - Present	As 1993 Passenger base, "Care & A Cure For ALS" screened in blue at bottom.	L/G		
	Atlantic White Shark	2016 - Present	As 1993 Passenger base, shark graphic screened at left, "Atlantic White Shark Conservancy" screened in black at bottom.	W/S		
	Basketball Hall of Fame	1993 - Present	As 1993 Passenger base, basketball hall of fame graphic screened at left, "BIRTHPLACE OF BASKETBALL" screened in blue at bottom.	B/B		
	Blackstone Valley	1999 - Present	Embossed Red Serial on blue and white plate with watermill graphic at left, "Massachusetts screened in blue at top, "Preserve the Trust" screened in blue at bottom.	B/V		
	Celtics	1987 - 1998	Embossed Red Serial on white plate, "Massachusetts" screened in blue at top, "The Spirit of America" screened in blue at bottom, "CELTICS" screened in red at left.			
	Celtics	1998 - 2025	Embossed Red Serial on white plate with Boston Celtics logo at left, "Massachusetts" screened in blue at top, "17-Time World Champions" screened in green at bottom left, "Boston Children's" screened in black at bottom.	C/S		
	Celtics	2025 - Present	The "17-Time World Champions" screened in green at the bottom left was removed. New "Boston Children's Hospital" wordmark screened along with fully colored Celtics logo.	C/S		
	Bruins	1987 - 1998	Embossed black serial in yellow plate, "Massachusetts" screened in black at top, "BRUINS" screened in black at left.			
	Bruins	1998 - Present	Embossed Red Serial on white plate with Boston Bruins logo at left, "Massachusetts" screened in blue at top, "Invest in Youth Hockey" screened in black at bottom.	B/R		
	Cape Ann	2017 - Present	Embossed Red Serial on white plate "Massachusetts" screened in blue at top, "lovecapeann.com" screened in blue at bottom.	C/A		
	Cape and Islands	1996 - 2006	Embossed Red Serial on blue and white plate with lighthouse graphic at left, "Massachusetts" screened in blue at top, "Cape Cod & Islands" screened in blue at bottom.	C/I		$50 annual fee
	Cape and Islands	2006 - 2024	Embossed Red Serial on blue and white plate with lighthouse graphic at left, "Massachusetts" screened in blue at top, "Cape Cod & Islands" screened in blue at bottom.	I/C		$50 annual fee
	Cape and Islands	2024 - Present	Embossed Red Serial on blue and white plate with lighthouse graphic at left, "Massachusetts" screened in blue at top, "Cape Cod & Islands" screened in blue at bottom.	C/P		$50 annual fee
	Choose Life	2010 - Present	Embossed Red Serial on white plate, mother and child graphic screened at left, "Massachusetts" screened in blue at top, "Choose Life" screened in black at bottom.	C/L		
	Conquer Cancer	2006 - Present	Embossed blue tear drop and yellow sunset screened at left, "Conquer Cancer" screened in blue at bottom.	C/C		
	Cure Breast Cancer	2006 - Present	Embossed pink breast cancer ribbon screened at left, "Cure Breast Cancer" screened in blue at bottom.	B/C		
150x150	Dr. Seuss	2025 - Present	Embossed image of The Cat in the Hat and the website “SeussInSpringfield.org” at the bottom of the plate.	D/R		
	Fallen Heroes	2016 - Present	Embossed Red Serial on white plate, Massachusetts Fallen Heroes graphic screened at left, "Massachusetts" screened in blue at top, "Honor Their Sacrifice" screened in blue at bottom.	F/H		
	Firefighters Memorial	2006 - Present	Embossed Red Serial on white plate, Firefighter graphic screened at left, "Massachusetts" screened in blue at top, "Firefighters Memorial" screened in red at bottom.	F/F		
	Fish and Wildlife	1998 - Present	Embossed Red Serial on blue and white plate with fish graphic at left, "Massachusetts screened in purple at top, "Preserve the Trust" screened in white at bottom.	F/W		
	Freemasonry	2017 - Present	Embossed Red Serial on white plate, Freemason graphic screened at left, "Massachusetts" screened in blue at top, "Freemasonry" screened in blue at bottom.	M/M		
	Fresh and Local	2015 - Present	Embossed Red Serial on white plate, Pumpkin graphic screened at left, "Massachusetts" screened in blue at top, "Choose Fresh and Local" screened in blue at bottom.	A/G		
	Habitat and Heritage	2022 - Present	Embossed Red Serial on white plate, deer graphic screened at left, "Massachusetts" screened in blue at top, "Habitat and Heritage" screened in black at bottom.	S/L		
	Invest in Children	1998–Present	Embossed Red Serial on white and blue plate, children graphic screened at left, "Massachusetts" screened in blue at top, "Invest in Children" screened in white at bottom.	T/C		
	Martha's Vineyard	2015 - Present	Embossed Red Serial on white plate, ferry graphic screened at left, "Massachusetts" screened in blue at top, "Martha's Vineyard" screened in blue at bottom.	M/V		
	Mass Animal Coalition	2003 - Present	Embossed Red Serial on white plate, dog and cat graphic screened at left, "Massachusetts" screened in blue at top, "I'm Animal Friendly" screened in blue at bottom.	S/N		
	250 Years of Independence	2025 - Present	Embossed White Serial on blue plate with "1776" circled by 13 star graphic screened at left, "Massachusetts" screened in red at top, "250 Years of Independence" screened in white at bottom.	M/A		
	Nantucket Island	2016 - Present	Embossed Red Serial on white plate, Nantucket and whale graphic screened at left, "Massachusetts" screened in blue at top, "Nantucket Island" screened in blue at bottom.	N/I		
	New England Patriots	2005 - 2017	Embossed Red Serial on white plate, "Massachusetts" screened in blue at top, "New England Patriots Charitable Foundation" screened at bottom.	N/E		
	New England Patriots	2017 - 2022	Embossed Red Serial on white plate, "Massachusetts" screened in blue at top, "New England Patriots Charitable Foundation" screened at bottom.	N/E		
	New England Patriots	2022 - Present	Embossed Red Serial on white plate, "Massachusetts" screened in blue at top, "New England Patriots Charitable Foundation" screened at bottom.	N/E		
	Olympic Spirit	1996 - Present	Embossed Red Serial on white and blue plate, USA Olympics graphic screened at left, "Massachusetts" screened in blue at top, "Olympic Spirit" screened in white at bottom.	O/S		$50 annual fee
	Overdose Awareness	2025 - Present	Embossed purple ribbon with angel wings and a halo and the words “Overdose Awareness”.			
	Pan-Mass Challenge	2015 - Present	Embossed Red Serial on white plate, Pan-Mass logo screened at left, "Massachusetts" screened in blue at top, "Share the Road" screened in blue at bottom.	P/M		
	Plymouth 400	2015 - Present	Embossed Red Serial on white plate, mayflower graphic screened at left, "Massachusetts" screened in blue at top, "An American Story, A National Legacy" screened in blue at bottom.	P/L		
	Red Sox / Jimmy Fund	2010 - 2023	Embossed Red Serial on white plate, Red Sox Logo screened at left, "Massachusetts" screened in blue at top, "The Jimmy Fund" screened in blue at bottom.	J/F		
	Red Sox / Jimmy Fund	2010 - 2023	Embossed Red Serial on white plate, Red Sox Logo screened at left, "Massachusetts" screened in blue at top, "The Jimmy Fund" screened in blue at bottom.	R/S		
	Red Sox / Jimmy Fund	2023 - Present	Embossed pair of red socks with a blue heart between them and Dana‑Farber/Jimmy Fund logos, commemorating the Jimmy Fund’s 75th anniversary.	R/S		
	Registered Nurse	2017 - Present	Embossed Red Serial on white plate, Registered Nurse graphic screened at left, "Massachusetts" screened in blue at top, "Advancing Health" screened in blue at bottom.	R/N		
	Right Whale	1994 - Present	Embossed Red Serial on white and blue plate, whale graphic screened at left, "Massachusetts" screened in blue at top, "Preserve the Trust" screened in blue at bottom.	R/W		
	Roseate Tern	1994 - Present	Embossed Red Serial on white and blue plate, whale graphic screened at left, "Massachusetts" screened in blue at top, "Preserve the Trust" screened in blue at bottom.	R/T		
	State Police Association	2019 - Present	Embossed Red Serial on white plate, state trooper hat graphic screened at left, "Massachusetts" screened in blue at top, "Protect and Serve" screened in blue at bottom.	P/S		
	State Police Association	2019 - Present	Embossed Red Serial on white plate, American flag and a blue police ribbon screened at left, "Massachusetts" screened in blue at top, "Protect and Serve" screened in blue at bottom.	P/S		
	Striped Bass	2019 - Present	Embossed Red Serial on white plate, striped bass graphic screened at left, "Massachusetts" screened in blue at top, "Striped Bass Conservation" screened in blue at bottom.	S/C		
	UMass	2013 - Present	Embossed Red Serial on white plate, UMass graphic screened at left, "Massachusetts" screened in blue at top, "You were. You are. UMASS." screened in red at bottom.	U/M		
	United We Stand	2002 - Present	Embossed Red Serial on American flag background, "Massachusetts" screened in blue at top, "United we Stand" screened in blue at bottom.	U/S		
	Welcome Home	2020 - Present	Embossed Red Serial on white plate, house graphic screened at left, "Massachusetts" screened in blue at top, "Welcome Home" screened in blue at bottom.	W/H		
	Zoo New England	2023 - Present	Embossed image of a gorilla and the words “Zoo New England” at the bottom of the plate and "Massachusetts" screened in blue at top,	Z/N		

== Government Plates ==
Image	Type	Design	Notes
	Governor's Council	Embossed Red Serial on white plate, with "GOVERNORS COUNCIL" in red on the left.	Governor's Council plates are issued to elected members of the Governor's Council.
	Honorary Consular	Embossed Red Serial on white plate, with "HON. CONSULAR CORPS" in red on the left.	Honorary Consular plates are issued to a private individual who is authorized to perform limited functions on behalf of a foreign government.
	House	Embossed Red Serial on white plate, with "HOUSE" in red on the left, and the state seal on the right.	House plates are issued to elected members of the Massachusetts House of Representatives.
	Senate	Embossed Red Serial on white plate, with "SENATE" in red on the left, and the state seal on the right.	Senate plates are issued to elected members of the Massachusetts State Senate.
	United States Congress	Embossed Red Serial on white plate, with "*U.S. CONGRESS*" in red on the left.	US Congress plates are issued to elected members of the US House of Representatives.
	United States Senate	Embossed Red Serial on white plate, with "*U.S. SENATE*" in red on the left.	US Senate plates are issued to elected members of the US Senate.

== Medical / Disability Plates ==
Image	Type	Dates Issued	Design	Serial Prefix	Notes
	Disability		Embossed red serial on white plate, with the International Symbol of Access icon in red on the left.		
	Disabled Veteran	2005	Embossed red serial on a white plate, with a vertical solid blue bar containing six white stars on the left and the word "Disabled" next to it, followed by a vertical red‑and‑white striped bar with the word "Veteran" next to it.”		
	Disabled Veteran	2005 - Present	Embossed red serial on white plate, with International Symbol of Access"icon holding an American Flag, in red on the left, and with "Disabled Veteran" screened in blue on the bottom.		
	Emergency Vehicle		Embossed white serial on red plate, "Emergency Vehicle" in white to the left, and "Emergency" in white at the bottom.		
	Medical Doctor		Embossed red serial on white plate, with "MD" icon in red on the left.	M/D	

== Military Plates ==
Image	Type	Design	Serial Prefix	Notes
	Bronze Star	Embossed red serial on white plate, with Bronze Star medal on the left, and "Veteran" on the bottom.	V/B	
	Congressional Medal of Honor	Embossed white serial on blue plate, with six white stars on both sides, "CONGRESSIONAL MEDAL OF HONOR" on the top, and "Massachusetts" on the bottom.		
	Distinguished Flying Cross	Embossed red serial on white plate, with a Distinguished Flying Cross medal on the left, and "Veteran" on the bottom.	D/F	
	Ex-POW	Embossed red serial on white plate, with barbed wire and "Ex POW" on the left.		
	Gold Star Family	Embossed red serial on white plate, with a gold star on the left on a vertical black bar and "Gold Star Family" on the bottom.	G/S	
	Legion Of Valor	Embossed red serial on white plate, with "Legion of Valor" on the left.		
	Medal Of Liberty	Embossed red serial on white plate, with Medal of Liberty on the left.	M/L	
	National Guard	Embossed red serial on white plate, with an image of a National Guard solder on the left, and "National guard" on the bottom.		
	Pearl Harbor Survivor	Embossed red serial on white plate, with an eagle and a "Pearl Harbor Survivor" banner on the left, and "Veteran" on the bottom.		
	Purple Heart	Embossed red serial on white plate, with Purple Heart medal on the left, and "Veteran" on the bottom.		
	Purple Heart	Embossed red serial on white plate, with Purple Heart medal on the left, and "Combat Wounded" on the bottom.		
	Silver Star	Embossed red serial on white plate, with Silver Star medal on the left.		
	Veteran	Embossed red serial on white plate, with American Flag on the left, and "Veteran" on the "bottom". The left side will have a branch of service decal (Army, Navy, Coast Guard, Marine Corps, Air Force).		
	Veteran	Embossed red serial on white plate, with "Veteran" on the "bottom". No American Flag.		

== "Other" Plates ==
Image	Type	Dates issued	Design	Serial Prefix	Serials issued	Notes
	Antique		Embossed Red Serial on white plate with the embossed word "Antique" at the bottom.			Vehicle must be 25 years or older and may only be used and maintained for use in exhibitions, club activities, parades, and other functions of public interest.
	Electric Vehicle	2012 - Present	Embossed Red Serial on white plate, green EV graphic screened at left, and "Electric Vehicle" screened in blue at bottom.	E/V		Optional for electric and hybrid vehicles.
	Electric Vehicle	2012 - Present	Embossed Red Serial on white plate, green EV graphic screened at left, and "Electric Vehicle" screened in blue at bottom.	V/E		Optional for electric and hybrid vehicles.
	Foreign Organization		Embossed Red Serial on white plate with "Foreign Organization" screened at the bottom.			
	HAM Operator		Embossed Red Serial on white plate with red separator for call sign.			
	Limited Use Vehicle (LUV)		Embossed Red Serial on white plate with "Limited Use" icon in a yellow square screened on the right side.	L/U		
	Low Speed		Embossed Red Serial on white plate with "Low Speed" screened at the bottom and an orange triangle with missing corners on the right side.	L/S		
	News Photographer		Embossed Red Serial on white plate with "NEWS PHOTOG" screened on the left side.			Issued to members of the Boston Press Photographer's Association.

== Non-passenger plates ==
Image	Type	Dates Issued	Design	Serial format	Serials issued	Notes
	Commercial	1987–1991	As "Spirit of America" base, but with embossed "COMMERCIAL" in place of slogan	123·456	1 to 999·999	All Commercial plates expire on December 31.
	Commercial	1991–1993	As "Spirit of America" base, but with embossed "COMMERCIAL" in place of slogan	A 1234; A12·345	A 1000 to C99·999	All Commercial plates expire on December 31.
	Commercial	1993–2007	As above, but with embossed "DEC" at top left	A 1234; A12·345	D 1000 to approximately M63·800	All Commercial plates expire on December 31.
	Commercial	2007–2019	As above, but with "DEC" screened rather than embossed	A 1234; A12·345	M63·801 to approximately V43·499	All Commercial plates expire on December 31.
	Commercial	2019–present	As above, but with "COMMERCIAL" screened rather than embossed	A 1234; A12·345	V43·500 to at least Z27·646 (as of May 3, 2026)	All Commercial plates expire on December 31.
	Trailer	1987–2004	As "Spirit of America" base, but with embossed "TRAILER" in place of slogan	123·456	1 to 999·999	All Trailer plates expire on November 30.
	Trailer	2004–2008	As "Spirit of America" base, but with embossed "TRAILER" in place of slogan	A 1234	A 1000 to Z 9999	All Trailer plates expire on November 30.
	Trailer	2008–2021	As "Spirit of America" base, but with embossed "TRAILER" in place of slogan	A12·345	A10·000 to approximately F68·449	All Trailer plates expire on November 30.
	Trailer	2021–2024	As "Spirit of America" base, but with embossed "TRAILER" in place of slogan	TZ 12345	TZ 10000 to TZ 99999	All Trailer plates expire on November 30.
	Trailer	2024–present	As "Spirit of America" base, but with embossed "TRAILER" in place of slogan	TZ 1234A	TZ 1000A to at least TZ 5952M (as of April 30, 2026)	All Trailer plates expire on November 30.
	Apportioned	1987–2018	As "Spirit of America" base, but with screened "APPORTIONED" in place of slogan	12345	10000 to 99999	All Apportioned plates expire on June 30.
	Apportioned	2018–2021	As "Spirit of America" base, but with screened "APPORTIONED" in place of slogan	1234 A	1000 A to 9999 B	All Apportioned plates expire on June 30.
	Apportioned	2021–present	As "Spirit of America" base, but with screened "APPORTIONED" in place of slogan	1AB23C	1AA10A to at least 1AL17T (as of April 30, 2026)	All Apportioned plates expire on June 30.
