= Variety, the Children's Charity =

American charity

Variety, the Children's Charity is a charitable organization founded in Pittsburgh, Pennsylvania in 1927.

== History ==
On October 10, 1927, a group of eleven men involved in show business set up a social club which they named the "Variety Club". On Christmas Eve 1928, a small baby was left on the steps of the Sheridan Square Film Theatre, owned by John H. Harris, with a note reading:

Please take care of my baby. Her name is Catherine, named after my grandmother. I can no longer take care of her. I have eight others. My husband is out of work. She was born on Thanksgiving Day. I have always heard of the goodness of showbusiness people and pray to God that you will look after her. Signed, a heartbroken mother.

Since efforts to trace the mother failed, the members of the Variety Club named the child Catherine Variety Sheridan after the location in which she was found, and undertook to fund the child's living expenses and education. Later the club decided to raise funds for other disadvantaged children.

The discovery of the baby inspired the Paramount Pictures film Variety Girl (1947). In May 1947, a group of members of the Variety Club of New England toured Sidney Farber's lab at Children's Hospital Boston, where Farber studied childhood leukemia. Farber, and the group's leader, Bill Koster, ended up founding the Children's Cancer Research Fund in order to raise money and sponsor research into forms of cancer affecting children.

The two men also founded The Jimmy Fund, which raises money for the Dana–Farber Cancer Institute.

== Terminology ==
Given its origins in the world of show business, Variety often uses carnival and circus terminology. For instance, a local or national chapter of the charity is known as a "tent", and the main board of trustees and others of a particular tent are called the Crew. That is a reference to those who erected the old circus tents or, nowadays, provide the various technical experts to make a film or stage a live production. The chairman of the board is called the Chief Barker, after the man who drummed up customers at the fairground.

== Telethons ==
In some localities, Variety holds fundraising telethons for the organisation.

- Currently, Buffalo, New York holds an annual Variety telethon for the Women's and Children's Hospital in March. The telethon has run continuously each year since 1962. The organizers claimed that this was the longest running locally produced telethon in the world, though the WHAS Crusade for Children and the Green Bay Cerebral Palsy telethon on WBAY-TV both began their runs before the Buffalo Variety telethon. Entertainer Clint Holmes co-hosts the telethon; from 1994 to 2012, Art "Mr. Food" Ginsburg was also a co-host. From 1963 to 2019, WKBW-TV carried the telethon; it returns to its inaugural home of WGRZ in 2020 with a prime time showing, with a second telethon on WBBZ-TV the following day.
- CHAN-DT in Vancouver holds an annual Show of Hearts telethon every year, usually the second weekend of February, for the Variety organisation in British Columbia; what previously featured live acts among the stories and pleas to donate, the telethon now features pre-recorded concerts as entertainment, in similar fashion to pledge drives on most PBS stations.
- CKND-TV Winnipeg presented their own annual Show of Hearts every spring, through the early-2000s (decade).
- KIRO-TV in Seattle held an annual Variety Club Telethon from 1969 to 1989. The last telethon took place in 1989, and the Pacific Northwest chapter closed down in 1992.
- The Iowa Chapter of Variety has held an annual Variety Telethon since 1975. Celebrating its 44th year in 2018, the telethon is Variety – the Children's Charity of Iowa's largest fundraiser.

== Variety Club of Great Britain ==
The Variety Club of Great Britain was started in the UK in 1949 with a dinner at the Savoy Hotel attended by film moguls, agents and celebrities, all eager to freely donate their time and talent to help raise funds for children. Fundraising campaigns have included a shoe-recycling scheme through the European Recycling Company. The club's annual get-together provided a popular meeting place for England's entertainment industry.

=== Variety Club of Great Britain Awards ===
The Variety Club Showbiz Awards was one of the most eagerly anticipated events in the showbiz calendar. A list of celebrities, industry stalwarts and kingpins, as well as personalities from the fields of film, TV, comedy, theatre, sports, pop and classical music. Made by hand, in sterling silver, these awards have been presented to some of the biggest showbiz celebrities.

Previous award winners include Audrey Hepburn, Leslie Caron, Laurence Olivier, Alan Bates, Ronni Ancona, Alec Guinness, The Beatles, Maggie Smith, Anthony Hopkins, Phil Collins, Elaine Paige, Keira Knightley, Peter O'Toole, Jeremy Irons, Jude Law, Sean Connery, James McAvoy, Kenneth Brannagh, Ricky Gervais, Muhammad Ali, Michael Caine, Stephen Fry, John Hurt, Alan Carr, Michael Parkinson, Helen Mirren, Ben Kingsley, Andrew Lloyd Webber, Bonnie Tyler, Tom Jones, Kylie Minogue, Culture Club, Lisa Stansfield, Spandau Ballet, Judi Dench, Daniel Radcliffe, Katherine Jenkins, Sophie Ellis-Bextor, Michael Sheen, and Ewan McGregor.

Categories:

- Show Business Personality
- Best Film Actor
- Best Film Actress
- Best Stage Actor
- Best Stage Actress
- Most Promising Newcomers
- Television Personality
- Independent Television Personality
- Comedy Awards
- Musical Theatre
- Radio Personality
- Best Recording Artist of the Year
- Special Awards
- Outstanding Contribution To Showbusiness

== The Bash ==
In Australia (and previously in New Zealand) a popular fund-raising method is the 'Variety Bash' - a motoring event travelling through remote outback areas in old cars often 'themed' and crewed by entrants dressed as appropriate to the car's theme. The Bash is not a race or a rally but a drive through the outback with your 'mates'. The concept was originally an idea of Australian businessman and philanthropist Dick Smith who with businessman John Singleton organized the first Bash from Bourke, outback New South Wales to Burketown, far north Queensland in 1985. Since that time, events have been held annually through Variety Australia, raising millions of dollars annually.

== Countries with chapters ==
To date the organization has grown to include 41 chapters (or "tents" as they are termed by the organization) in 15 countries worldwide, including:

- Australia – 7 tents
- Barbados
- Canada – 6 tents
- Hong Kong
- Indonesia
- Ireland
- Israel
- Japan
- Jersey
- New Zealand
- Singapore
- South America
- Sri Lanka
- United Kingdom
- United States – 16 tents
