= Norma Farber =

American children's book writer and poet (1909-1984)

Norma Holzman Farber (6 August 1909 – 21 March 1984) was an American children's book writer and poet. The Poetry Society of America presents the Norma Farber First Book Award, which is awarded for a first book of original poetry written by an American.

== Life ==
She was born in Boston in 1909, daughter of G. Augustus and Augusta Schon Holzman. She attended Girls' Latin School. She earned degrees from Wellesley College, and Radcliffe College.

On 3 July 1928, she married Sidney Farber, (died 1973) the founder of the Children's Cancer Research Foundation (now the Dana–Farber Cancer Institute) in Boston. According to her obituary published in the New York Times, she was also a classical soprano. Farber was sister-in-law to noted philosopher Marvin Farber, faculty at the University at Buffalo.

Farber authored six books of poems and 18 children's books. Her poetry was first published in the 1940s, and she was still active in writing until her death from vascular disease in 1984. She was survived by four children.

== Awards ==
- Belgium's Premier Prix in singing in 1936
- Golden Rose Award
- As I Was Crossing Boston Common, was nominated for a National Book Award in 1975

== Works ==
=== Poetry ===
- Look to the Rose: Poems. s.n. 1958.
- A Desperate Thing: Marriage is a Desperate Thing. Poems. Plowshare Press. 1973. ISBN 978-0-87368-202-2.
- Something Further: Poems. Kylix Press. 1979. ISBN 978-0-914408-10-9.
- Shekhina: Forty Poems. Capstone Editions. 1984. ISBN 978-0-9610662-2-2.
- A Birth in the Family: Nativity Poems. El León Literary Arts. 2003. ISBN 978-0-88739-538-3.

=== Juvenile poetry ===
- These Small Stones: Poems. with Myra Cohn Livingston. Harper & Row. 1987. ISBN 978-0-06-024013-4.
- When it Snowed that Night. Petra Mathers (illus.). HarperCollins. 1993. ISBN 978-0-06-021707-5.
- All Those Mothers at the Manger. Megan Lloyd (illus.). Harper & Row. 1985. ISBN 978-0-06-021869-0.
- Small wonders: poems. Kazue Mizumura (illus.). Coward, McCann & Geoghegan. 1979. ISBN 978-0-698-20484-3.
- Never say ugh to a bug. Jose Aruego (illus.). Greenwillow Books. 1979. ISBN 978-0-688-80140-3.
- As I was Crossing Boston Common. Arnold Lobel (illus.). E. P. Dutton. 1991. ISBN 978-0-525-25960-2.

=== Juvenile fiction ===
- Mercy Short: A Winter Journal, North Boston, 1692-93. Dutton. 1982. ISBN 978-0-525-44014-7. first printing 1973
- The Boy who Longed for a Lift. Brian Selznick (illus.). HarperCollins. 1997. ISBN 978-0-06-027108-4.

=== Anthology ===
- Poets of Today, Norma Farber. "The Hatch, Poems". Robert Pack. "The Irony of Joy, Poems". Louis Simpson. "Good News of Death, and Other Poems". Scribner. 1955.
