= New Sweden, Maine =

Town in Maine, United States

- Town
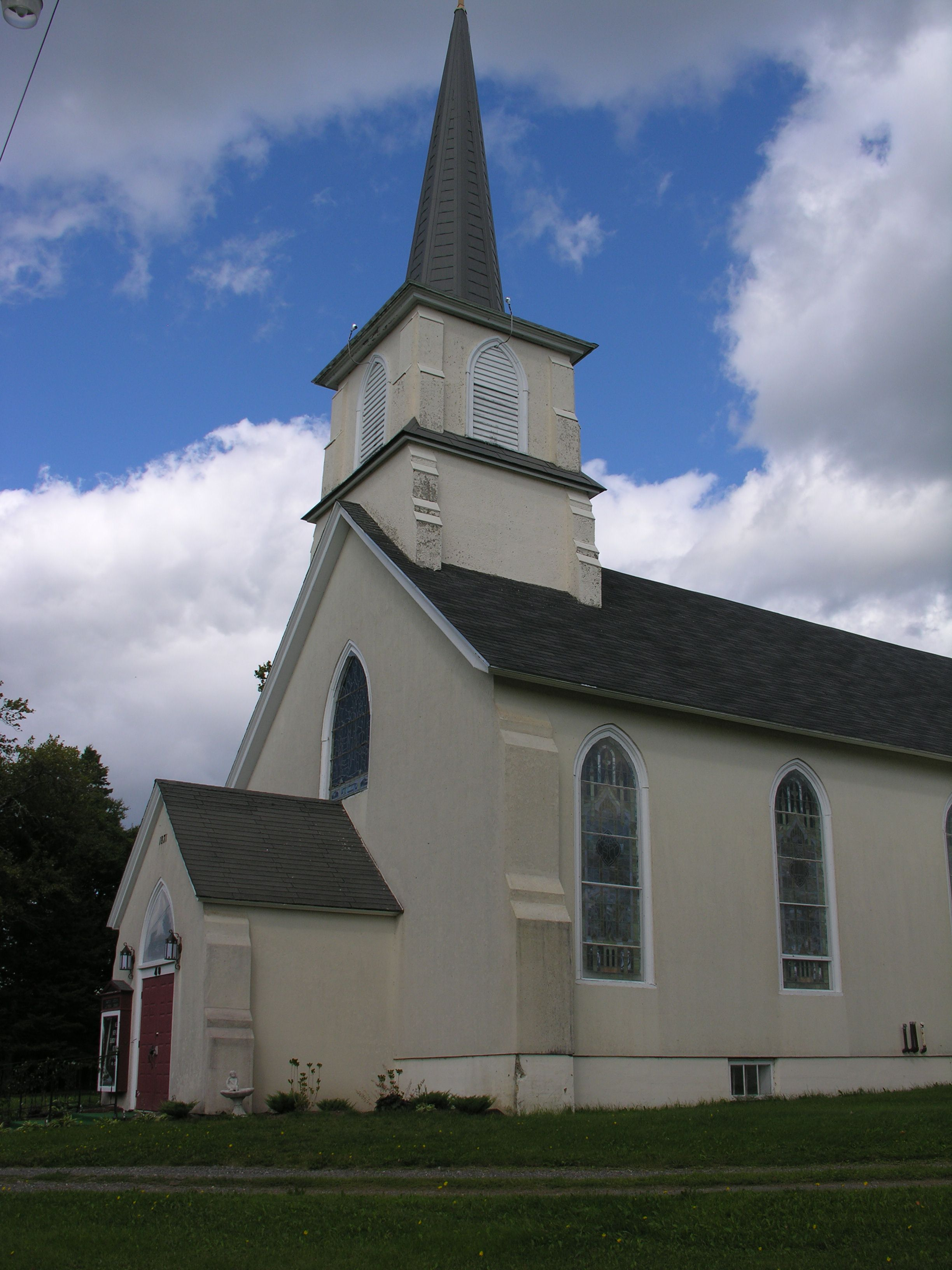
- Gustaf Adolph Lutheran Church in New Sweden, Maine. September 2014.

- Location of New Sweden, Maine
- Coordinates: 46°59′45″N 68°07′16″W
- Country: United States
- State: Maine
- County: Aroostook
- Villages: New Sweden; Sweden; Jemtland

Area
  - Total: 34.60 sq mi (89.61 km^{2})
  - Land: 34.57 sq mi (89.54 km^{2})
  - Water: 0.031 sq mi (0.08 km^{2})
- Elevation: 637 ft (194 m)

Population (2020)
  - Total: 577
  - Density: 17/sq mi (6.4/km^{2})
- Time zone: UTC-5 (Eastern (EST))
  - Summer (DST): UTC-4 (EDT)
- ZIP code: 04762
- Area code: 207
- FIPS code: 23-49415
- GNIS feature ID: 582625

New Sweden is a town in Aroostook County, Maine, United States. The population was 577 at the 2020 census.

== History ==
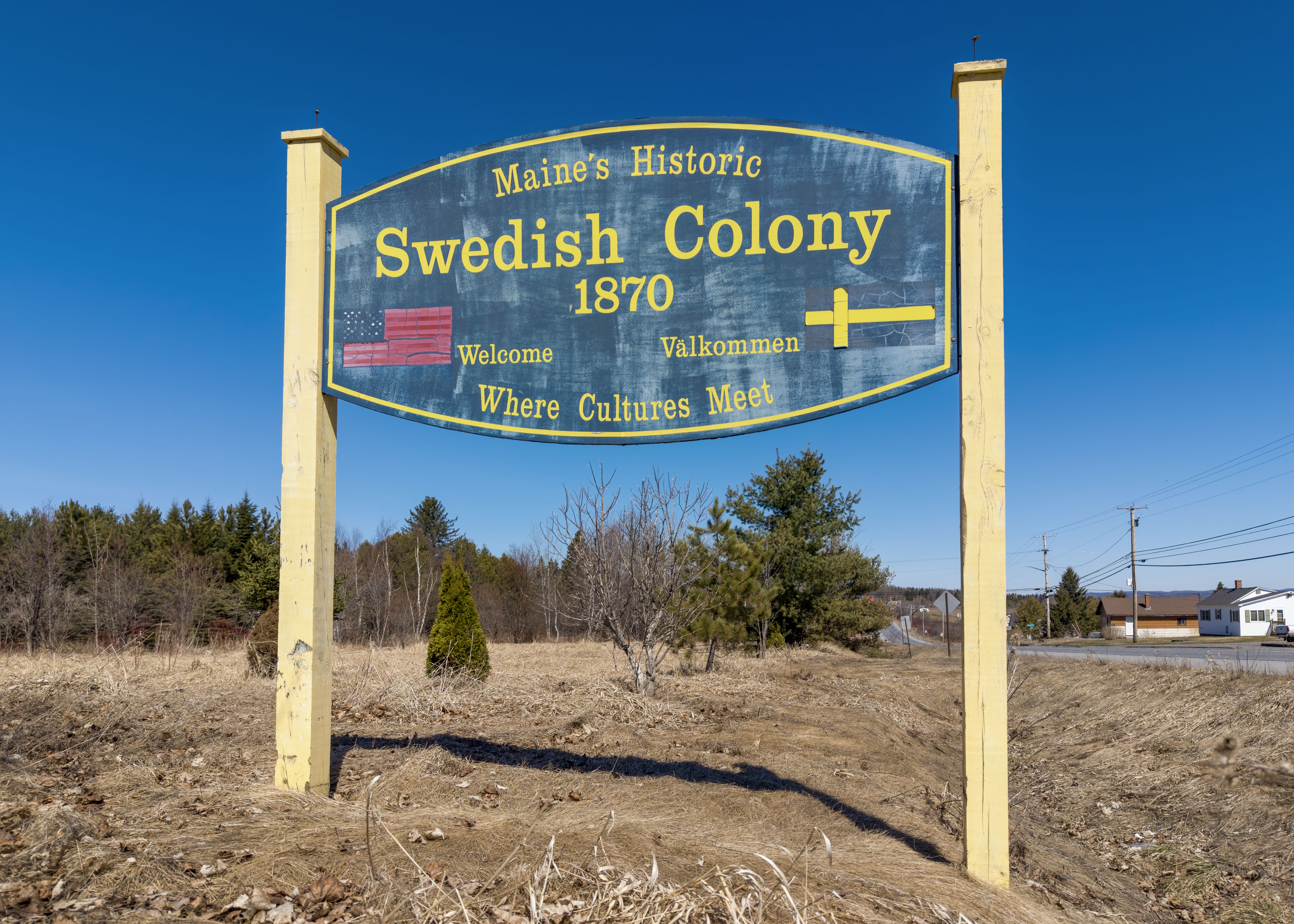
Welcome sign

New Sweden started in 1870.

New Sweden has maintained many Swedish traditions since its founding, including the celebrations of St. Lucia Day and "Midsommar." Founders Day is also observed on July 23 every year. The Swedish language can sometimes still be heard in the older generation. The New Sweden Folk Dancers typically perform at many of the Swedish celebrations and Swedish foods are known to grace the tables.

New Sweden was the home of Einar Gustafson, who was the archetype of the child for whom the Jimmy Fund was named. The Disappearance of Stefanie Damron occurred here in September 2024.

== Geography ==
According to the United States Census Bureau, the town has a total area of 34.60 square miles (89.61 km^{2}), of which 34.57 square miles (89.54 km^{2}) is land and 0.03 square miles (0.08 km^{2}) is water.

== Demographics ==
Historical population
Census	Pop.	Note	%±
1880	517		—
1890	707		36.8%
1900	867		22.6%
1910	905		4.4%
1920	964		6.5%
1930	898		−6.8%
1940	844		−6.0%
1950	827		−2.0%
1960	713		−13.8%
1970	639		−10.4%
1980	737		15.3%
1990	715		−3.0%
2000	621		−13.1%
2010	602		−3.1%
2020	577		−4.2%
U.S. Decennial Census

=== 2010 census ===
As of the census of 2010, there were 602 people, 255 households, and 182 families living in the town. The population density was 17.4 inhabitants per square mile (6.7/km^{2}). There were 323 housing units at an average density of 9.3 per square mile (3.6/km^{2}). The racial makeup of the town was 95.5% White, 0.3% African American, 1.7% Native American, 0.3% Asian, 0.2% from other races, and 2.0% from two or more races. Hispanic or Latino of any race were 0.8% of the population.

There were 255 households, of which 26.7% had children under the age of 18 living with them, 59.2% were married couples living together, 6.7% had a female householder with no husband present, 5.5% had a male householder with no wife present, and 28.6% were non-families. 25.5% of all households were made up of individuals, and 13.7% had someone living alone who was 65 years of age or older. The average household size was 2.36 and the average family size was 2.81.

The median age in the town was 48.3 years. 19.6% of residents were under the age of 18; 4.8% were between the ages of 18 and 24; 18.9% were from 25 to 44; 39.2% were from 45 to 64; and 17.4% were 65 years of age or older. The gender makeup of the town was 50.5% male and 49.5% female.

=== 2000 census ===
Languages (2000)	Percent
Spoke English at home	92.50%
Spoke Swedish at home	4.17%
Spoke French at home	3.33%

As of the census of 2000, there were 621 people, 247 households, and 179 families living in the town. The population density was 17.9 people per square mile (6.9/km^{2}). There were 319 housing units at an average density of 9.2 per square mile (3.5/km^{2}). The racial makeup of the town was 95.17% White, 0.16% African American, 1.29% Native American, 0.48% Asian, 0.16% from other races, and 2.74% from two or more races. Hispanic or Latino of any race were 2.25% of the population. 33.4% were of Swedish, 16.9% French, 14.5% English, 9.6% Irish and 6.0% German ancestry according to Census 2000.

There were 247 households, out of which 29.1% had children under the age of 18 living with them, 60.3% were married couples living together, 6.1% had a female householder with no husband present, and 27.5% were non-families. 22.7% of all households were made up of individuals, and 10.9% had someone living alone who was 65 years of age or older. The average household size was 2.51 and the average family size was 2.94.

In the town, the population was spread out, with 22.5% under the age of 18, 5.2% from 18 to 24, 26.2% from 25 to 44, 31.1% from 45 to 64, and 15.0% who were 65 years of age or older. The median age was 44 years. For every 100 females, there were 102.3 males. For every 100 females age 18 and over, there were 93.2 males.

The median income for a household in the town was $29,625, and the median income for a family was $42,563. Males had a median income of $30,625 versus $22,500 for females. The per capita income for the town was $14,534. About 10.4% of families and 14.4% of the population were below the poverty line, including 24.4% of those under age 18 and 11.8% of those age 65 or over.

== Historic buildings and sites ==
Several sites and buildings in New Sweden are listed in the National Register of Historic Places. Among them are the Larsson–Noak Historic District and the Gustaf Adolph Lutheran Church, which was organized in August, 1871.

The Gustaf Adolph Lutheran Church was served by a native Swedish pastor, the Reverend Hans Olof Andræ, from 1979 to 1985. Rev. Andræ also served as pastor to the Faith, Caribou, and Trinity (formerly Oscar Frederick) Lutheran churches. He occasionally conducted services in Swedish. His daughter, Rebecka Vanja Andræ, taught conversational Swedish classes from 1983 to 1985.

== 2003 poisoning ==
The town made national news headlines in 2003 when a man poisoned the coffee urn at the local Lutheran church, sickening 15 parishioners and killing one. On April 27, 2003, 78-year-old Walter Reid Morrill, known to the town by his middle name, died of arsenic poisoning after drinking coffee at the Gustaf Adolph Lutheran Church in New Sweden, and 15 other, mostly elderly churchgoers became ill, three of them seriously. Five days later, church member Daniel Bondeson, 53, was found after apparently shooting himself in the lower-chest with a rifle, and left a suicide note in which he confessed to committing with the poisoning stating that it was caused by a dispute that the church did not use an altar-table he donated weeks before the poisoning. The note also stated that he intended to sicken the parishioners rather than kill them, but the first death from a poisoning to a friend of his drove him to suicide. The note has never been released to the public. The arsenic was later discovered to have been sourced from Bondeson's farm where it was used as a herbicide. Another victim would die years later due to complications from the poisoning.

The crime was chronicled in Christine Young's 2005 true crime book A Bitter Brew: Faith, Power, and Poison in a Small New England Town and on the show, Mystery ER, which aired an episode on this incident from the point of view of the youngest victim, then 30 years old.

== Other sources ==
- The Story of New Sweden as Told at the Quarter Centennial Celebration (University of Michigan Library. 1896)
- Lenentine, Charlotte The Swedish People of Northern Maine (University of Maine. 1950)
- Hede, Richard Maine's Swedish Colony 1870–1970 Centennial Book (1970)
- Young, Christine Ellen. A Bitter Brew: Faith, Power, and Poison in a Small New England Town. Berkley Pub Group, 2006. ISBN 0425209180, 9780425209189.
