= Frederick C. Dommeyer =

American philosopher

Frederick Charles Dommeyer (January 12, 1909 – July 24, 1988) was an American philosopher and parapsychologist.

Dommeyer was born in Warrington, Florida. He obtained an M.A. (1935) and Ph.D. (1937) from Brown University. He worked at Syracuse University where he was head of the philosophy department (1944–1958). He was a member of the American Society for Psychical Research and contributed articles to the Philosophy and Phenomenological Research, The Philosophical Review and The Journal of Philosophy.

He married Mariam Pankov in 1937. They had several children: Barbara, Carl, and Curt. Dommeyer was a Unitarian Universalist.

== Publications ==
- Body, Mind and Death (1965)
- Current Philosophical Issues: Essays in Honor of Curt John Ducasse (1966)
