= Bekenstein =

Bekenstein is a surname. Notable people with the surname include:

- Jacob Bekenstein (1947–2015), Mexican-born Israeli-American physicist
- Joshua Bekenstein, American businessman
