= Gustaf Adolph Lutheran Church =

Historic church in Maine, United States

- U.S. National Register of Historic Places
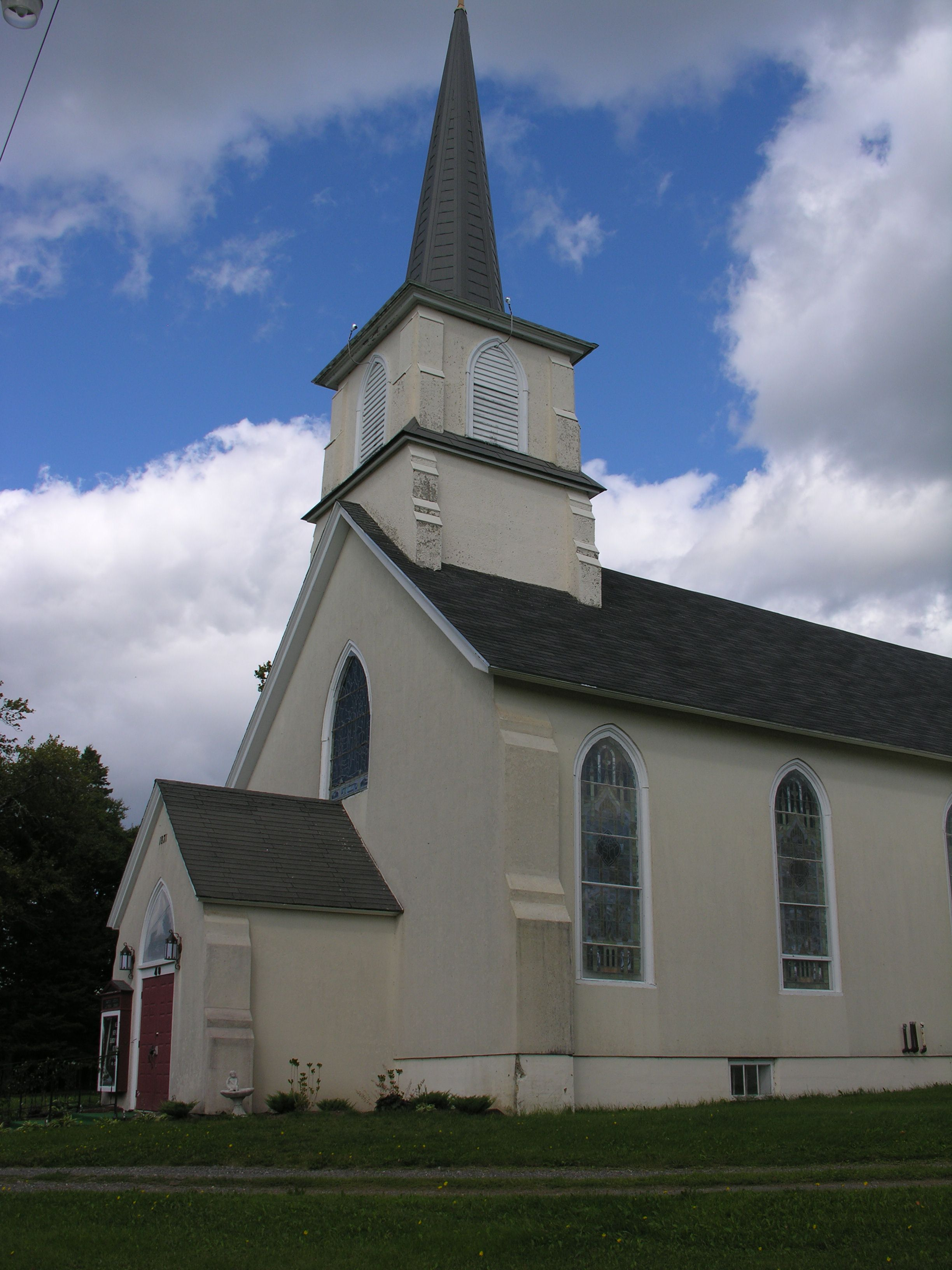

- Location within Maine Location within the United States
- Location: E side of Capitol Hill Rd., .5 mi. N of jct. with ME 161, New Sweden, Maine
- Coordinates: 46°56′19″N 68°7′14″W
- Area: less than one acre
- Built: 1880
- Architectural style: Late Gothic Revival
- NRHP reference No.: 97000608
- Added to NRHP: June 20, 1997

The Gustaf Adolph Lutheran Church is a historic church at 29 Capitol Hill Road in New Sweden, Maine. The congregation was established by Swedish immigrants to the area in 1871, and the Gothic Revival sanctuary was built in 1879-80. In 1896 the church was named in honor of King Gustavus Adolphus of Sweden. It was listed on the National Register of Historic Places in 1997. The church congregation was in 2003 subjected to one of the nation's largest cases of arsenic poisoning, perpetrated by one of its parishioners.

== Description and history ==
The Gustaf Adolph Lutheran Church is set on the east side of Capitol Hill Road, about 0.5 miles (0.80 km) north of its junction with New Sweden Road (Maine State Route 161). The church is a single-story wood frame structure whose exterior is finished in stucco. Its windows are uniformly Gothic style lancet-arch windows. It has a two-stage square tower, whose second stage houses a belfry with round-arched louvers. The belfry is topped by an octagonal steeple with a cross at the top. An entrance vestibule with gable roof projects from the front facade, with a double-door topped by a lancet-arched (roughly triangular) stained-glass window. One ell extends southward from the rear of the building, forming Svea Hall, the parish hall, and another smaller one extends east.

The interior of the sanctuary is largely white plastered walls, with dark stained pews and painted woodwork. The altar area is separated from the sanctuary by an elliptical carved railing and its rear wall is decorated by a large painting depicting Christ at Gethsemane. The Svea Hall, added in 1912, has pressed metal decorative walls and ceilings.

The first Swedish immigrants arrived in the area in 1870, as part of a program by the state to recruit settlers for the remote northern part of the state. These early settlers began Lutheran church services the following year, and in 1874 began planning construction of a church. The main part of the present building was completed in 1880 and dedicated in 1881 as the First Swedish Evangelical Church in Maine. In 1896 it was renamed Gustaf Adolph Lutheran Church after the 17th-century King Gustavus Adolphus of Sweden. The town of New Sweden was incorporated in 1895. The church parsonage (extensively modified and no longer historically significant) was built in 1886, and the church hall was added in 1911-12. The interior of the church underwent major renovations in 1930, at which time the exterior (which was originally clapboarded) was redone in stucco. The small eastern addition was made in the 1940s.

The church received nationwide press coverage in 2003 when sixteen of its parishioners were poisoned, one fatally, by arsenic which had been added to coffee served after a church service. One week later a parishioner committed suicide, leaving a note claiming responsibility for the poisoning and claiming church politics as the reason. Another parishioner died several years later from complications associated with the poisoning.

== See also ==
- National Register of Historic Places listings in Aroostook County, Maine
