= Disappearance of Stefanie Damron =

2024 missing child case in Maine, United States

Stefanie Damron, a 13-year-old girl from New Sweden, Maine, US, disappeared on September 23, 2024. She was last seen leaving her home and walking into the nearby woods on West Road following an argument with her sister. Her family reported her missing the following day.

Stefanie Damron's FBI Missing poster

At the time of her disappearance, Stefanie was described as 5 feet tall, weighing 130 pounds, with shoulder-length brown hair and green eyes. She was wearing blue jeans, a long-sleeved blue shirt, and black Harley Davidson hiking boots. Additional photos were released by police.

== Investigation ==
Aroostook County and woods around West Road home of Damron

Locations
1 West Road near Damron home.

Despite extensive search efforts by the Maine State Police and the Federal Bureau of Investigation, including land searches, interviews, and following leads across Maine, the United States, and Canada, Stefanie remains unlocated. Community members have held vigils and organized search efforts to support the family and raise awareness about Stefanie's disappearance.

== Aftermath ==
In December 2024, the FBI announced a reward of up to $15,000 for information leading to Stefanie's safe return or the arrest and prosecution of anyone involved in her disappearance. The Bureau put Damron on their Most Wanted Kidnappings and Missing Persons list.

== Media ==
In early 2025, a website, teamstefanie.org, was created by a group of volunteers searching for Stefanie. The website contains unbiased case information, links to media coverage, and answers to frequently asked questions.
