= Larsson–Noak Historic District =

Historic district in Maine, United States

- U.S. National Register of Historic Places
- U.S. Historic district
- Location within Maine Location within the United States
- Location: Station Road, New Sweden, Maine
- Coordinates: 46°56′48″N 68°6′28″W
- Area: 50 acres (20 ha)
- Built: 1888
- Architectural style: Maine Swedish Log House
- NRHP reference No.: 89000847
- Added to NRHP: July 26, 1989

The Larsson–Noak Historic District encompasses a collection of buildings constructed by Swedish immigrants to northern Maine between about 1888 and 1930. The district is focused on a cluster of four buildings on Station Road, northeast of the center of New Sweden, Maine. Notable among these is the c. 1888 Larsson-Ostlund House, which is the only known two-story log house built using Swedish construction techniques in the state. Across the street is the c. 1900 Noak Blacksmith Shop, a virtually unaltered building housing original equipment. The district was listed on the National Register of Historic Places in 1989.

== Description and history ==
The Larsson–Noak Historic District encompasses a rural agricultural landscape of 50 acres (20 ha) in southeastern New Sweden. On the north side of Station Road stands the Lars Noak Blacksmith Shop, a single-story wood-frame building with a gable roof. Oriented roughly north–south, with its side to the road, the shop has a double-leaf door in the southern gable end, with a sash window to its right. The eastern facade has six sash windows, and the north facade has a single-leaf door and three sash windows. The walls are finished in wooden shingles. The interior of the building houses a forge, anvil, and blacksmithing tools original to its c. 1900 construction.

Across the street from the shop stands the Larsson-Ostlund House, a three-section structure whose oldest portion is a two-story log structure, finished in wooden clapboards. Extending to the north from this original block are two additions of wood-frame construction. The main facade of the original block is three bays wide, with a center entry and five sash windows, all framed by simple trim. The walls are fashioned out of logs fitted using traditional Swedish dovetail joinery, and extend all the way up into the gables. No other houses in the state are known to extend log construction through two floors, or into the gable ends, which are usually framed with dimensional lumber. The first addition to the north has a two-story saltbox shape, with a secondary entrance and a porch extending across its width. The second addition is a simple single-story structure, with two sash windows flanking a wide vertical-board door.

Other features of the district include a potato house, built c. 1928, which is a two-story gambrel-roofed wood-frame structure on a concrete foundation, and a single-bay garage, also a wood-frame structure, built about 1910. The foundational remains of the property's barn lie a short way to the north.

New Sweden was settled by Swedish immigrants under a program initiated by the state in 1861 to draw migrants to northern Maine. By 1880 the "Swedish colony" was a thriving community with 163 households, and the program had drawn more than 1,000 immigrants to locations across the state. This property was settled by the Larsson family in 1870, who built the house and garage. In 1910 most of the land was bought by George Ostlund, who added the potato house. The blacksmith shop was built by Noak Larsson's son Lars Noak, on land given to him by his father.

== See also ==
- National Register of Historic Places listings in Aroostook County, Maine
