= European Recycling Company =

SOEX UK
- Industry: Fashion
- Key people: Andy Haws (CEO)
- Parent: SOEX
- Website: soex.uk

European Recycling Company is a German company that specialises in recycling clothes and footwear on behalf of charities. It gives a percentage of its profits to the charities. The company is owned by Nerses Ohanian, and is registered in Switzerland.

The company rebranded under the name SOEX UK in 2018.

== See also ==
- SOEX Group, related multinational
