= Einar Gustafson =

Cancer patient (1935–2001)

- Born: Carl Einar Gustafson; August 18, 1935; New Sweden, Maine, U.S.
- Died: January 21, 2001 (aged 65); Caribou, Maine, U.S.
- Other name: "Jimmy"
- Known for: The Jimmy Fund

Einar Gustafson (August 18, 1935 – January 21, 2001) gained fame as a 12-year-old cancer patient when he became nationally known as "Jimmy". The name started a fund-raising program in 1948 known as The Jimmy Fund for the Dana–Farber Cancer Institute. The Jimmy Fund was adopted as the official charity of the Boston Red Sox in 1953.

== Early life ==
Einar Gustafson was born in New Sweden, Maine on August 18, 1935. Growing up on a potato farm, Gustafson would walk to school. One day on his walk, when he was 12-years-old, he began experiencing abdominal pain. After two surgeries, it was recommended that he travel to Boston where he was admitted to the newly founded Children's Hospital: Dana–Farber Cancer Institute. A patient of founder Dr. Sidney Farber, Gustafson was diagnosed with non-Hodgkin's lymphoma. Survival rate was between 20 and 30 percent at the time. Gustafson was one of the first children to ever receive chemotherapy.

To lift the spirits of the children in the cancer facility, Bill Koster of the "Variety Club of New England" in partnership with Farber contacted popular radio host Ralph Edwards and invited him to broadcast his program Truth or Consequences live nationwide from the children's ward to raise money for the Cancer Research Fund. Edwards agreed. The problem arose when the Fund needed a poster child to attract fundraising. Most children admitted to the hospital suffered from leukemia and were too frail for public appearance. Farber and Koster specifically chose Gustafson who did not have leukemia; but was being treated for intestinal lymphoma.

In a 1998 interview, Gustafson remembered children he shared a ward with at the Institute. One boy in particular who had striking, movie-star features, "The doctors one day pulled the curtain around him," Gustafson recalled, "and, jeez, you wouldn’t know what had happened."

When the program aired, Edwards gave Gustafson the pseudonym "Jimmy", saying: "We’re not going to give you his last name because he's just like thousands of other young fellas and girls in private homes and hospitals across the country. Jimmy is suffering from cancer, but he doesn’t know he has it."

Gustafson with his new television set at the Dana–Farber Cancer Institute

The show had scheduled players from the Boston Braves to surprise Gustafson in his room. Team members Warren Spahn, Eddie Stanky, and Phil Masi entered Gustafson's room, presenting him with gifts. Manager Billy Southworth gave Gustafson a tailored Braves uniform and a special message: "We play the Chicago Cubs tomorrow in a doubleheader at Braves Field, and we're calling it Jimmy's Day." When asked what he wanted most, Gustafson said he wanted a television set so that all the kids in the cancer ward could watch his heroes play baseball.

Edwards informed the listening radio audience that if $20,000 was raised in donations, "Jimmy" would be given a television set on which to watch the Braves play. Not only did funds exceed the goal, bringing in a total of $231,485.51; but the Braves went on to win the 1948 pennant. On Edwards's request, Gustafson led the Braves in a chorus of "Take Me Out to the Ball Game". The radio program was so effective that members of the local public filled the lobby of the hospital to personally hand in their donations so that "Jimmy" could watch the Braves on TV.

Baseball's ongoing relationship with the Jimmy Fund originated into a partnership that continues to this day with the Boston Red Sox after the Braves moved to Milwaukee in 1953. The Red Sox adopted the Jimmy Fund; and player Ted Williams became its strongest supporter, due to the fact that his own brother had died from leukemia at age 39. Williams raised millions for the disease.

After being discharged in 1948, Gustafson visited the Children's Hospital for follow-up treatments; getting rides from his Uncle in his pick-up truck from Maine to Boston. Dr. Farber privately kept in touch with Gustafson until he suffered a heart attack in his office in 1973.

== Later life ==
After his cancer went into remission, Gustafson returned to his family farm in New Sweden, Maine. Gustafson married his high school sweetheart in 1957, moved to Buzzards Bay, Massachusetts, where he founded a long-distance trucking business. They had three daughters: Lynn, Lisa and Lori. After his first wife died in 1986, Gustafson married his second wife, Gloria, and relocated for good back to New Sweden, Maine.

For decades, Gustafson's identity and whereabouts were unknown. Associates with the Dana-Farber institute assumed that he had died due to low survival rates. It wasn't until 1997, when his sister Phyllis Clauson sent a letter along with her annual Jimmy Fund donation stating that he was alive and living in Maine that Gustafson re-entered the national spotlight. Then Jimmy Fund director Mike Andrews dismissed the letter and it was thought lost. Luckily the letter was found by Karen Cummings who took the letter seriously and wrote back: "We do, however, assume that he passed away, as the vast majority of children who contracted cancer in the 1940s did not survive." Then one day she received a phone call. It was Gustafson. "This is Jimmy," he said, "Heard you were looking for me." He still had the tailored Braves uniform which proved his identity. The phone call was just in time for the 50th anniversary of the original radio broadcast with Ralph Edwards and the Boston Braves.

In 1998, 50 years later, Ralph Edwards and Gustafson had a reunion at Fenway Park. In July 1999, Ted Williams met then 63-year-old Gustafson at the Dana-Farber Institute. "This is the biggest thrill of my trip, right here," Williams said of the meeting, "Isn’t that something?" Gustafson was named honorary chairman of the Jimmy Fund in 1999.

Gustafson died of a stroke on January 21, 2001, at a hospital in Caribou, Maine.
