= Sidney Farber =

American pediatric pathologist regarded as the father of chemotherapy

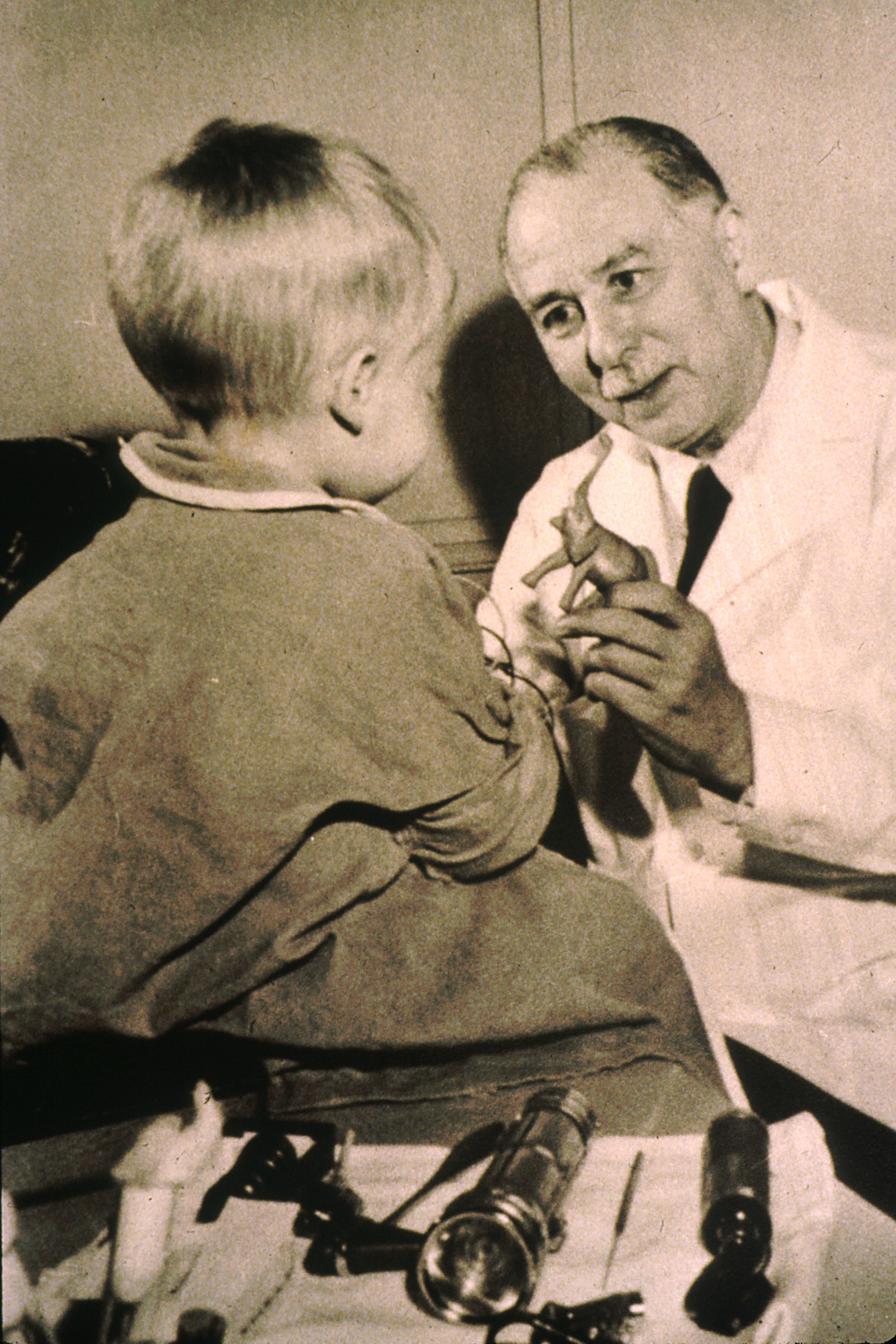
- Farber in 1960
- Born: September 30, 1903; Buffalo, New York, U.S.
- Died: March 30, 1973 (aged 69); Boston, Massachusetts, U.S.
- Education: University at Buffalo; Harvard University
- Known for: Chemotherapy, fundraising and advocacy for cancer research
- Spouse: Norma (née Holzman) (m. 1928)
- Relatives: Marvin Farber (brother)
- Awards: Lasker-DeBakey Clinical Medical Research Award
- Scientific career
- Fields: Oncology, pathology, pediatrics
- Workplaces: Boston Children's Hospital; Dana–Farber Cancer Institute

Sidney Farber (September 30, 1903 – March 30, 1973) was an American pediatric pathologist at Boston Children's Hospital. He is regarded as the father of modern chemotherapy for his work using folic acid antagonists to combat leukemia, which led to the development of other chemotherapeutic agents against other malignancies. Farber was also active in cancer research advocacy and fundraising, such as through his establishment of The Jimmy Fund, a foundation dedicated to pediatric research in childhood cancers. The Dana–Farber Cancer Institute is named after him.

== Early life ==
Farber was born in Buffalo, New York, to Jewish parents Simon Farber and Matilda (née Goldstein). He was the third of 14 children. One of his brothers was the philosopher and University of Buffalo professor Marvin Farber (1901–1980).

Farber graduated from University at Buffalo, The State University of New York, or SUNY Buffalo, in 1923. Farber Hall, built in 1953 on the South Campus of SUNY Buffalo, is named for him.

In the mid-1920s, Jewish students were often refused admission to US medical schools, prompting him to go to Europe. As Farber was fluent in German, he undertook his first year of medical school at the Universities of Heidelberg and Freiburg in Germany. Having excelled in Germany, Farber entered Harvard Medical School as a second-year student and graduated in 1927.

Farber pursued postgraduate training in pathology at Peter Bent Brigham Hospital (the predecessor of Brigham and Women's Hospital) in Boston, Massachusetts, where he was mentored by Kenneth Blackfan, and was appointed to a resident pathologist post at Children's Hospital in 1929.

== Career ==
Following postgraduate training, Farber became an Instructor in Pathology at Harvard Medical School in 1929. That same year, he was also appointed the first full-time pathologist to be based at Children's Hospital, where he became a close mentee and friend of pathologist Simeon Burt Wolbach. Farber was an extremely meticulous and precise scientist, and his laboratory become known for its tidiness.

In 1946, Farber was named Chairman of the Staff at the Children's Hospital, where he managed the Medical Center of Children's and envisioned an Institute for Pediatric Pathology which now exists as the Pediatric Research building. Farber was appointed Pathologist-in-Chief of the Children's Hospital in 1947 and Professor of Pathology at Harvard Medical School in 1948.

In 1973, Farber was presented with the prestigious ASIP gold-headed cane award. Throughout his career, Farber published more than 270 books and research papers on pediatric pathology, autopsy, and the history of medicine. Many remain classic references today, such as his 1937 book on autopsy methods and techniques titled The Postmortem Examination.

=== Founder of pediatric pathology ===
Farber's research was primarily focused on diseases in children and infants. His work at Children's spanned many areas, including cystic fibrosis, celiac disease, infant hyaline membrane disease, Eastern equine encephalitis, eosinophilic granuloma, meconium ileus, and sudden infant death syndrome. As a result, Farber is now known as a founder of pediatric pathology.

=== Father of modern chemotherapy ===
==== Childhood acute lymphoblastic leukemia ====
Through the mid- to late-1940s, childhood acute lymphoblastic leukemia was almost inevitably fatal and little was known about the mechanisms of the disease. Only basic forms of treatment were available, including red blood cell transfusions and antibiotics, leading to survival rates of merely weeks to months after diagnosis. Despite general pessimism in the scientific community towards efforts to cure cancer, Farber became dedicated to the battle against childhood leukemia in 1947 during his assistant professorship at Children's Hospital and Harvard Medical School.

Farber discovered that folic acid plays a key role in the proliferation of cancer cells in leukemias. Realizing this, he attempted to use a folate antagonist, aminopterin, to block the function of folic acid in patients with leukemia in hopes of achieving remission. In 1947, Farber conducted a clinical trial on aminopterin on 16 children, 10 of whom eventually achieved temporary remission. While many practicing physicians responded to these results with enthusiasm, many scientists expressed disbelief and resistance against the new drug since Farber, a young pathologist at the time, was viewed as presumptuous. However, Farber's discovery marked a breakthrough in cancer research since no drugs had previously been found effective against tumors of the bodily fluids.

While working at Harvard Medical School on a research project funded by a grant from the American Cancer Society, he carried out both the preclinical and clinical evaluation of aminopterin (synthesized by Yellapragada Subbarow). He showed for the first time that induction of clinical and hematological remission in this disease was achievable. These findings promoted Farber as the father of the modern era of chemotherapy for neoplastic disease, having already been recognized for a decade as a founder of modern pediatric pathology.

==== Wilms' tumor ====
Throughout the 1950s and '60s, Farber continued to make advances in cancer research, notably the 1955 discovery that the antibiotic actinomycin D and post-operative radiation therapy could produce remission in Wilms' tumor, a pediatric cancer of the kidneys. The antibiotic, derived from Streptomyces parvulus, was originally offered for free by the Eli Lilly Pharmaceutical Company. Farber and his colleagues published their results on the efficacy of actinomycin D in 1960, and further development of treatment protocols by the National Wilms Tumor Study Group resulted in a 90% survival rate in children with Wilms' tumors by the end of the century.

=== Other scientific contributions ===
In 1939, during his appointment at the Children's Hospital, Farber worked with colleague Jerome S. Harris to publish a classic description of the transposition of the great blood vessels in the heart. This work played a major role in the development and advancement of pediatric cardiac surgery.

In 1952, Farber described a lipid storage disease that was subsequently named Farber disease.

=== The Jimmy Fund ===
Farber began raising funds for cancer research with the Variety Club of New England in 1947. Together they created the Children's Cancer Research Foundation (CCRF), which was one of the first nationwide fundraising efforts to take full advantage of modern media, such as a broadcast of the radio show Truth or Consequences. On May 22, 1948, one of the CCRF's first patients to respond to Farber's antifolate, a twelve-year-old boy named Einar Gustafson, appeared on the show. Despite having Burkitt lymphoma, rather than leukemia, Gustafson (nicknamed 'Jimmy' for publicity purposes) became an inspiration for all pediatric cancer patients and triggered the renaming of the CCRF to the Jimmy Fund.

The success of the Jimmy Fund led Farber to realize the importance of marketing in the scientific advancement of knowledge about diseases. For the remainder of his career, Farber would extend far beyond his identity as a pathologist and oncologist, becoming not only a clinician but a public cancer research advocate too. This personal transition reflected the shift in society's attitude towards cancer as well; bringing cancer into the public spotlight propelled funding and awareness for cancer research for the remainder of the century and beyond.

=== Cancer research advocacy ===
Beginning in the early 1950s, and continuing until his death in 1973, Farber became a star presenter at Congressional hearings on appropriations for cancer research. A compelling speaker, he was very successful in his efforts. With Mary Woodard Lasker, a longtime advocate of biomedical research, famed surgeon Michael E. DeBakey, Senator J. Lister Hill of Alabama and Congressman John E. Fogarty of Rhode Island, Farber led the drive for a massive expansion in federal spending for cancer research. Between 1957 and 1967, the annual budget of the National Cancer Institute, the government's primary funder of cancer research, jumped from $48 million to $176 million.

=== Dana–Farber Cancer Institute ===
In 1974, Farber's CCRF was renamed the Sidney Farber Cancer Center, and again in 1976 to the Sidney Farber Cancer Institute. Long-term financial support by industrialist Charles A. Dana and his foundation was acknowledged by the building of the Charles A. Dana Building in 1978 and the establishment of the Institute's present name of the Dana–Farber Cancer Institute in 1983.

== Personal life ==
Farber married Norma Farber (née Holzman) in 1928, a poet, author of children's books, and classical soprano.

On March 30, 1973, at the age of 69, Sidney Farber died from cardiac arrest while working in his office. Upon his death he was survived by his widow, four children, and three grandchildren.

== See also ==
- Cancer (2015 film)
- Farber disease
- History of cancer
- History of cancer chemotherapy
- The Emperor of All Maladies: A Biography of Cancer
