= Pan-Mass Challenge =

Fundraising bike-a-thon

- Formation: August 1980; 45 years ago
- Founder: Billy Starr
- Type: Athletic fundraiser
- Purpose: Fundraising for cancer research and care
- Headquarters: Needham, Massachusetts
- Chairman: Billy Starr
- Volunteers: 3,500 (2023)
- Website: pmc.org

The Pan-Mass Challenge (PMC) is a fundraising bike-a-thon started in 1980 by Billy Starr to benefit the Dana–Farber Cancer Institute via the Jimmy Fund. It raises more money than any other single athletic fundraiser in the country.

== History ==
Starr created the Pan-Mass Challenge in 1980, several years after his mother contracted melanoma. In its first year, the event raised $10,200 and had 36 riders, who rode from Springfield to Provincetown. The PMC was the first athletic fundraiser to require participants to guarantee their pledges with a personal credit card, a change that caused riders' delinquency rate to fall from 17 percent to 3 percent. In 2024, 6,800 riders participated in the 45th annual Pan-Mass Challenge. It raised $75 million, the largest donation the Dana-Farber Cancer Institute has received. Lifetime fundraising for the event since 1980 exceeded $1 billion in 2024.

Notable past riders in the PMC include former NFL quarterback Alex Smith, three-time Tour de France winner Greg LeMond, Olympic speed skater Johann Olav Koss, multiple Boston Marathon winner Uta Pippig, three-time Super Bowl champion Troy Brown, Joshua Bekenstein (a PMC board member), Dana-Farber CEO Laurie Glimcher, Massachusetts Governor Charlie Baker, Boston mayor Marty Walsh, restaurateur Jody Adams, former Secretary of State John Kerry, Nobel laureate William Kaelin, Senator Scott Brown, Judge Samuel Zoll, Overstock.com CEO Patrick Byrne, and football player Joe Andruzzi.

== Format ==
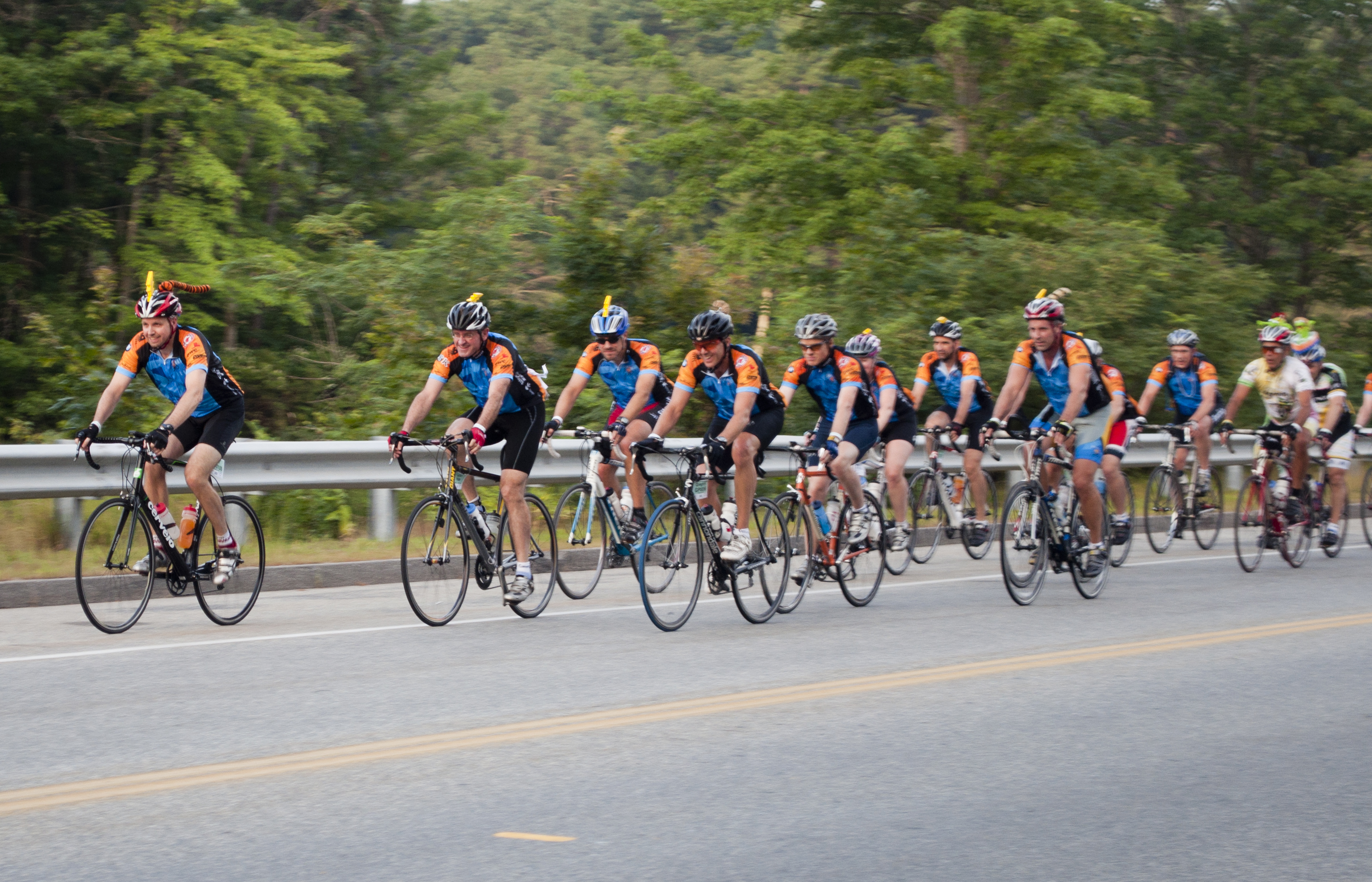
Cyclists riding in the 2011 Pan-Mass Challenge.

Each August, cyclists ride for one or two days, on one of 16 routes ranging from 25 to 211 miles long running through 47 Massachusetts towns. The longest route runs from Sturbridge to Bourne on the first day (although this route was retired after the 2025 ride, with plans for a new route beginning in Worcester in 2026 , followed by the 100-mile Wellesley Century route beginning and ending at Babson College on the second day. Some teams have "Pedal Partners", children who are currently receiving cancer treatment via the Jimmy Fund. Riders commit to raising between $1,000 and $6,000, depending on their age and the route they will be riding. As of 2015, 75 percent of riders had previously participated in the event, and 1,100 had participated for 10 years or more.

In 2016 a new winter event, the PMC Winter Cycle, was created. Since 2018, it has been held inside Fenway Park.

Local PMC Kids Rides are held throughout the year.

In October 2022, more than 200 riders participated in the first PMC Unpaved event, a one-day, off-road gravel ride in the Berkshires. Approximately 400 riders participated in the 2024 PMC Unpaved event.

== Impact ==
The PMC is the Dana–Farber Cancer Institute's largest donor and provides 66% of the Jimmy Fund's annual revenue as of 2024. From 1980 to 2024, the event raised $1.047 billion. This funding has been directed to cancer care and research, including helping fund the development of 41 cancer drugs. Since 2007, 100 percent of the money raised by riders goes to the Dana–Farber Cancer Institute, with all event overhead funded by sponsors, entry fees, and other income. In 2018, 200 sponsors provided $7 million in support.

Since its inception, the PMC has inspired various other athletic fundraising events that followed it, like Relay for Life for the American Cancer Society and Pelotonia for the James Cancer Center in Columbus, Ohio. According to the Peer-to-Peer Professional Forum in 2023, the PMC is the third-largest peer-to-peer event fundraiser (behind the American Heart Association's Heart Walk and Relay For Life), and the PMC grosses more than any other single event fundraiser.
