= Marvin Farber =

American philosopher

- Born: December 14, 1901; Buffalo, New York, U.S.
- Died: November 24, 1980 (aged 78); Minneapolis, Minnesota, U.S.
- Relatives: Sidney Farber (brother)

Education
- Education: University of Buffalo, Harvard University, University of Berlin, University of Heidelberg
- Academic advisors: Edmund Husserl, Martin Heidegger, Heinrich Rickert, Ernst Zermelo

Philosophical work
- Era: 20th-century philosophy
- Region: Western philosophy
- School: Phenomenology
- Institutions: University of Buffalo
- Notable students: Wilfrid Sellars
- Main interests: Metaphysics, epistemology
- Notable ideas: Naturalism as the alternative to subjectivism in philosophy

Marvin Farber (December 14, 1901 – November 24, 1980) was an American philosopher and educator.

== Early life and education ==
Farber was born in Buffalo, New York, to Jewish parents Simon and Matilda (née Goldstein) Farber. He was the second oldest of their 14 children. One of his brothers was pathologist and cancer researcher Sidney Farber.

Initially a music student at the University of Buffalo, he transferred in 1920 to Harvard University, graduating summa cum laude with a bachelor's degree in philosophy in 1922. He earned his Ph.D. in 1925 at Harvard. He also attended the University of Berlin, the University of Heidelberg, and the University of Freiburg, studying under Edmund Husserl, Martin Heidegger, Heinrich Rickert, and Ernst Zermelo.

== Career ==
Farber taught for a year at Ohio State University between his studies in Germany. He then taught at his initial alma mater, the University at Buffalo, from 1927 to 1961 and 1964–1974; during the interim, he was Chairman of the Department of Philosophy at the University of Pennsylvania. After his first year at University of Buffalo, he was appointed Assistant Professor. He founded the journal Philosophy and Phenomenological Research in 1940 and was its editor until 1980. He was Chairman of the Department of Philosophy from 1937 to 1961. He was designated Professor Emeritus in 1974 and retired in 1977.

== Death ==
He died in Minneapolis after months of serious illness. He was survived by his wife Lorraine and three children.

== Honors and awards ==
- Guggenheim Fellowship, 1944–45
- Docteur de l'Universitė de Lille, 1955
- President, American Philosophical Association (Eastern Division), 1963

== Bibliography ==
- Naturalism and Subjectivism, 1959 ISBN 0-87395-036-4
- Phenomenology and Existence: Toward a Philosophy within Nature, 1967. ISBN 0-06-131295-9
- The Search for an Alternative: Philosophical Perspectives of Subjectivism and Marxism, 1984. ISBN 0-8122-7921-2
- The Foundation of Phenomenology: Edmund Husserl and the Quest for a Rigorous Science of Philosophy, 2006. ISBN 0-202-30853-7

== See also ==
- American philosophy
- List of American philosophers
