= Philosophy and Phenomenological Research =

- Discipline: Philosophy
- Language: English
- Edited by: Ernest Sosa

Publication details
- History: Founded: 1940; 86 years ago
- Publisher: Wiley-Blackwell on behalf of the International Phenomenological Society (USA)
- Frequency: Bimonthly
- Open access: No

Standard abbreviations
- ISO 4: Philos. Phenomenol. Res.

Indexing
- CODEN: PPHRAI
- ISSN: 0031-8205 (print); 1933-1592 (web)
- LCCN: 42024850
- JSTOR: 00318205
- OCLC no.: 1496324

Links
- Journal homepage; Online access; Online archive

Philosophy and Phenomenological Research (PPR) is a bimonthly philosophy journal founded in 1940. Until 1980, it was edited by Marvin Farber, then by Roderick Chisholm, and since 1986 by Ernest Sosa. It considers itself open to a variety of methodologies and traditions, as indicated by a statement appearing in each issue: "PPR publishes articles in a wide range of areas including philosophy of mind, epistemology, ethics, metaphysics, and philosophical history of philosophy. No specific methodology or philosophical orientation is required in submissions." It is published by the International Phenomenological Society based at Brown University in Rhode Island, United States.
