= SOEX Group =

Used textile recycling company

SOEX Gruppe
- Company type: Private limited company
- Industry: textile recycling
- Founded: 1977
- Headquarters: Ahrensburg, Germany
- Number of employees: 1350 (2020)
- Website: www.soex.de

The SOEX Group is a group of companies operating in the fields of used textile marketing and recycling. The group's headquarters are located in Ahrensburg (Schleswig-Holstein). With locations and holdings in five countries and approximately 1,350 employees, the SOEX Group is involved in the collection, marketing, recycling and utilisation of used textiles.

== Locations and holdings ==
- Soex Textil-Vermarktungsgesellschaft m.b.H. has its headquarters in Ahrensburg, Schleswig-Holstein.
- Soex Processing Germany GmbH and Soex Recycling Germany GmbH in Wolfen employ approximately 700 people who sort and process up to 300 tonnes of used textiles every day.
- I:Collect GmbH (I:CO) is an international service provider for the collection, reuse and recycling of textiles and shoes, as well as remnants, overproduction, complaints or goods with production defects, with national companies in Germany, Great Britain, China, France and the United States.
- Soex UK, based in Redhill, Surrey, United Kingdom, was active in the collection of used textiles and shoes in the United Kingdom.
- Since 2016, the group of companies has also had a location in the United Arab Emirates. Approximately 250 employees work at the plant in the Hamryah Free Trade Zone.

== History ==
Sourein Ohanian founded Soex Textil- und Autohandels-GmbH in Erwitte, North Rhine-Westphalia, in 1977, laying the foundation for today's Soex Group. The company moved to Bad Oldesloe in 1982. Over the next ten years, the company expanded its trade to the markets of Europe, South America and the Middle East and concentrated its business on the used textiles sector. In 1993, Soex took over EFIBA, a company specialising in the collection of used textiles.

In 1997, the foundation stone was laid for the company's own sorting plant, Soex-Sortierbetriebsgesellschaft mbH, in Bitterfeld-Wolfen. The following year, the Wolfen sorting plant went into operation with approximately 150 employees. In 1999, the company's own recycling plant was also inaugurated. Since the introduction of the third shift in 2004, almost 700 employees have worked at the Soex sorting and recycling plant in Wolfen. The plant was closed in January 2025.
