= Joshua Bekenstein =

American businessman

- Born: New York City, US
- Education: Yale University (BA); Harvard University (MBA)
- Occupation: Managing Director at Bain Capital
- Spouse: Anita
- Children: 5

Joshua Bekenstein is an American businessman and co-chairman of Bain Capital. He is recognized as a member of the Boston Billionaires Club.

== Early life and education ==
Bekenstein grew up in a Jewish family in New York City. He attended Birch Wathen School prior to its merger with Lenox School.

He attended Yale University, where he was a four year member of the men's lacrosse team. In 1980, he graduated from Yale with a Bachelor of Arts. In 2015, he received Yale's George H.W. Bush Lifetime of Leadership Award in recognition of his involvement on the Board of Advisors of the Yale School of Management, the Yale Investment Committee, an at-large member of the University Council, the co-chair of the Yale Tomorrow Campaign, a member of the Yale Development Council, and a successor trustee of the Yale Corporation in 2013.

After Yale, he attended Harvard Business School, where he received his MBA in 1984.

== Career ==
Bekenstein worked at Bain & Company following his graduation from Yale where he worked with companies in a variety of industries.

In 1984, he was hired by Bill Bain and Mitt Romney as one of the first employees of Bain Capital, the consulting firm. In 1986, he became a managing director and in 2016, he was named co-chairman of the firm.

Bekenstein is a board member of Gymboree Corporation, Dollarama, Toys "R" Us, Bombardier Recreational Products, Michaels Stores, Burlington Coat Factory, Waters Corporation, Bright Horizons Family Solutions, and Yale University.

== Personal ==
Bekenstein and his wife, Anita, live in Wayland, Massachusetts, and own a beachfront home on Nantucket. They have five adult children.

== Philanthropy ==
He and his wife are major donors to Democratic and liberal candidates and committees. The Bekensteins made significant contributions to two super PACs supporting Joe Biden, Unite the Country and Priorities USA Action. The Bekensteins pledged a total of $18,728,320 to Democratic causes, making Bekenstein the 17th largest Democratic donor of the 2020 election cycle. They also operate a donor-advised fund through the Combined Jewish Philanthropies of Boston.

Bekenstein is co-chair of the board of directors of New Profit Inc., a Boston-based venture philanthropy fund and as a member on the Board of Trustees of the Pan-Mass Challenge, an annual bike-athon that crosses the Commonwealth of Massachusetts to raise money for the Dana–Farber Cancer Institute, where Bekenstein is chairman of the board of trustees. Bekenstein co-chaired Dana-Farbers “Mission Possible” campaign that hit its goal to raise $1 billion a year early in September 2009. Bekenstein also chairs the board of Be The Change, is a board member of City Year, Opportunity Nation, and New Leaders. He also contributes to Horizons for Homeless Children, Year Up, Teach for America, Kipp Schools, and Boston Children’s Hospital.

In 2010, the National Association of Corporate Directors named Bekenstein Nonprofit Director of the Year.

Bekenstein contributed $100,000 to The Lincoln Project in June 2020.
