= The Jimmy Fund =

American cancer charity, founded 1948

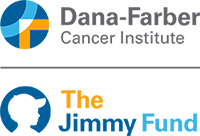
- Named after: Einar "Jimmy" Gustafson
- Formation: 1948; 78 years ago
- Tax ID no.: 04-2263040
- Purpose: Cancer research and patient care
- Headquarters: Brookline, Massachusetts
- Chairman: Tom Caron, Brock Holt
- Affiliations: Dana–Farber Cancer Institute, Boston Red Sox
- Website: jimmyfund.org

The Jimmy Fund, established in Boston in 1948, is made up of community-based fundraising events and other programs that benefit the Dana-Farber Cancer Institute. Since 1948, millions of people have given money to the Jimmy Fund to help save lives and reduce the burden of cancer for patients and families worldwide.

The Jimmy Fund holds fundraising events including Jimmy Fund Golf, the nation's oldest and largest charity golf program, and the Boston Marathon Jimmy Fund Walk. The Jimmy Fund is an official charity of the Boston Red Sox, the Massachusetts Chiefs of Police Association, the Pan-Mass Challenge, and the Variety Children's Charity of New England.

== History ==
In 1947, Sidney Farber founded the Dana-Farber Cancer Institute in Boston. The following year he launched the Jimmy Fund to raise money to support the hospital. The fund was named after a patient who was named "Jimmy" to protect his identity – his real name was Einar Gustafson and his identity was revealed in 1998.

On May 22, 1948, "Jimmy" inspired a movement on Truth or Consequences, a national radio program hosted by Ralph Edwards. During the program, "Jimmy" was visited in the hospital by star players from the Boston Braves; the visit was arranged by future New England Patriots owner Billy Sullivan. Listeners were moved to act when asked to send in money to buy Jimmy a TV so that he could watch the Boston Braves. More than $200,000 was raised for the Jimmy Fund that year.

Beginning in 1949, some movie theaters began showing a Jimmy Fund trailer before movies and asked audience members to contribute to the fund.

The Jimmy Fund’s baseball origins later evolved into a longstanding partnership with the Boston Red Sox after the Braves moved to Milwaukee in 1953.

In 1980, the Pan-Mass Challenge, a charity bicycle race, was founded to benefit the Jimmy Fund. In 1983, the Jimmy Fund began holding the Scooper Bowl, an ice cream festival, in Boston. Also in 1983, the fund began organizing golf tournaments to raise money. In 1989, the fund began organizing the Jimmy Fund Walk, which runs in conjunction with the Boston Marathon.

In 2002, the first WEEI Jimmy Fund Radiothon was held. In 2003, NESN joined the event and simulcasted it around New England.

In 2013, the Jimmy Fund held its first Big Ideas Contest asking the public to submit new fundraising ideas for the fund.

== See also ==
- Mike Andrews
