= Marcel Brands =

Dutch former professional footballer

Personal information
- Full name: Martinus Wilhelmus Brands
- Date of birth: 16 March 1962 (age 64)
- Place of birth: Den Bosch, Netherlands
- Position: Centre midfielder

Team information
- Current team: PSV (CEO)

Youth career
- –1980: Den Bosch

Senior career*
Years	Team	Apps	(Gls)
1980–1984	Den Bosch	59	(4)
1984–1986	RKC	62	(8)
1986	NAC	18	(0)
1987–1988	→ RKC	52	(24)
1988–1990	Feyenoord	60	(6)
1990–1997	RKC	232	(29)
1997–1998	OJC Rosmalen		
Total		484	(71)

Managerial career
- 1997: RKC (commercial manager)
- 1997–2000: RKC (technical director)
- 2000–2005: RKC (chief executive officer)
- 2005–2010: AZ (technical director)
- 2010–2018: PSV (technical director)
- 2018–2021: Everton (director of football)
- 2022–: PSV (chief executive officer)
- * Club domestic league appearances and goals

Marcel Brands (born 1962) is a Dutch retired footballer who is currently CEO of Eredivisie club PSV Eindhoven.

== Playing career ==
Born in 's-Hertogenbosch, Brands started his playing career at local club FC Den Bosch. He also played for NAC Breda and Feyenoord, and made over 350 appearances for RKC Waalwijk, encompassing two separate spells.

== Non-playing career ==
After retiring he became technical director at RKC Waalwijk and appointed Martin Jol as club manager. In 2005 he moved to join AZ, along with manager Louis van Gaal, and in 2008-09 the club went on to win only their second ever Eredivisie title. Brands moved to PSV in 2010 to improve the club's transfer strategy and youth development. He would spend eight years with the club, in which time they won three Eredivisie titles, three Johan Cruyff Shields and one KNVB Cup. In May 2018 he joined English club Everton, replacing Steve Walsh as their director of Football. On 5 December 2021, Brands left the club with immediate effect.
