= 2018–19 Liverpool F.C. season =

English football club season

Liverpool
2018–19 season
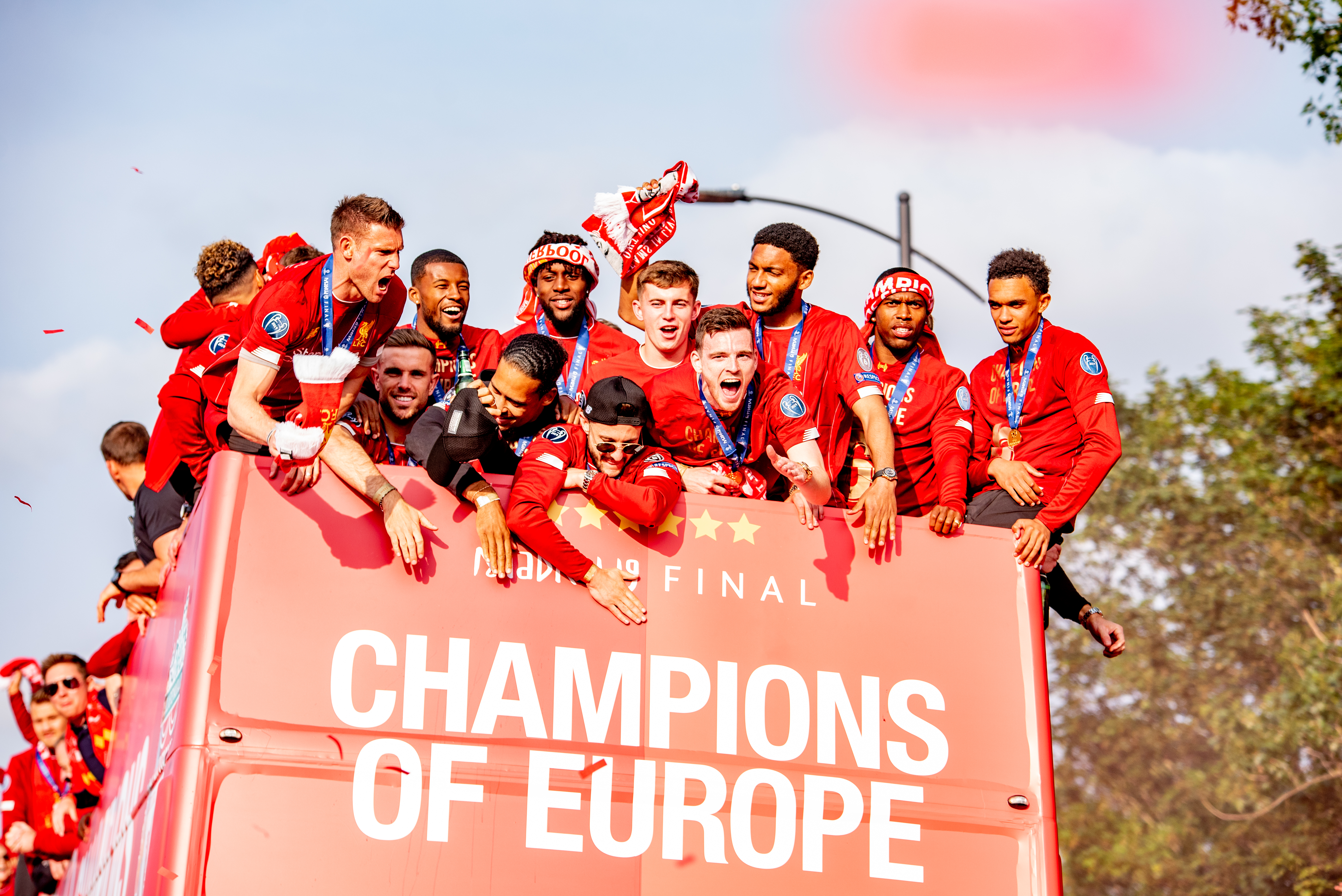
- Liverpool players during the UEFA Champions League victory parade, 2 June 2019
- Owner: Fenway Sports Group
- Chairman: Tom Werner
- Manager: Jürgen Klopp
- Stadium: Anfield
- Premier League: 2nd
- FA Cup: Third round
- EFL Cup: Third round
- UEFA Champions League: Winners
- Top goalscorer: League: Sadio Mané; Mohamed Salah (22 each); All: Mohamed Salah (27)
| Home colours | Away colours | Third colours |

The 2018–19 season was Liverpool Football Club's 127th season in existence, their 57th consecutive season in the top flight of English football and 27th consecutive season in the Premier League. Liverpool also competed in the FA Cup, EFL Cup and UEFA Champions League. The season covered the period from 1 July 2018 to 30 June 2019.

Liverpool finished the league season as runners-up to Manchester City, to whom they suffered their only league defeat, scoring 97 points, the then third-highest total in the history of the English top division and the most points scored by a team without winning the title. They remained unbeaten at home in the league for a consecutive season and matched the club record of 30 league wins in a season. In the UEFA Champions League, Liverpool reached the final for the second consecutive year after producing an improbable 4–0 comeback win over Barcelona to overturn their 3–0 first leg advantage. In the final, Liverpool defeated Tottenham Hotspur 2–0 to secure the club's sixth win in the competition. However, success eluded Liverpool in domestic cup competitions as they exited both the FA Cup and EFL Cup in the third round. This was the first full season since 2011–12 without Philippe Coutinho, who departed to Barcelona during the 2017-18 season, and this was the first season since 2013–14 without Emre Can, who departed to Juventus.

== Kits ==
| Home | Away | Third | Third Alt. |

== Season review ==
=== Pre-season ===
Liverpool's 2018–19 pre-season kicked off with its second signing (the first being Naby Keïta, a deal finalised the previous season) of the campaign with the transfer of Brazilian midfielder Fabinho from French club AS Monaco, a deal which became official on 1 July.

Liverpool seemed set for their third signing when the media confirmed that Liverpool had reached a deal with French club Lyon for their captain, Nabil Fekir. However, the club, while confirming negotiations were ongoing, announced that Fekir would be remaining at Lyon.

The first match of the pre-season took place on 7 July when the Reds visited Chester. Two goals from Harry Wilson in the first half followed by five goals in the second half, from James Milner from the spot, Daniel Sturridge, Ryan Kent, Danny Ings, then another goal from Sturridge to give Liverpool a 0–7 victory.

The club moved along to 10 July and a visit to Merseyside counterparts Tranmere Rovers. Rafael Camacho, Sheyi Ojo and Adam Lallana all scored in the first half to give the Reds a 0–3 lead. Tranmere fired back with goals from Jonny Smith scoring a rebound after a hard free kick Loris Karius could not hold on to, then Amadou Soukouna tacked on a late second, but Liverpool held on and won 2–3.

On 13 July, Liverpool formally announced their third signing of the summer — Swiss winger Xherdan Shaqiri from Stoke City, signing him for £13 million, his reported release clause.

The following day, on 14 July, Bury was able to deny Liverpool a victory with a 0–0 draw at Gigg Lane. Sturridge, Ojo and Dominic Solanke all had attempts cleared from the goal line.

On 19 July, Liverpool confirmed their fourth signing of the summer in Alisson Becker for a £56 million transfer fee, making him the most expensive goalkeeper in history at the time of purchase. That same day, Liverpool defeated Blackburn Rovers 0–2 with two second-half goals from Sturridge and Lazar Marković.

Liverpool then participated in the International Champions Cup in the United States, first heading to Charlotte's Bank of America Stadium on 22 July to play Borussia Dortmund. Virgil van Dijk opened scoring in the first half to give the Reds a 1–0 lead at halftime, but Dortmund stormed back with two goals from American Christian Pulisic and a late penalty kick from Jacob Bruun Larsen to give Dortmund the 1–3 victory.

Up next, on 26 July, was a trip to MetLife Stadium in East Rutherford, New Jersey, where Liverpool took on Manchester City. Leroy Sané opened the scoring in the 57th minute, but it was substitutes Sadio Mané and Mohamed Salah, coming back from their time off following the 2018 FIFA World Cup, to give Liverpool the 1–2 victory over the Premier League rivals.

Finally was the trip to Michigan Stadium in Ann Arbor and a crowd of over 100,000 people on 29 July against rivals Manchester United. Liverpool first saw a penalty converted by Mané, only for an immediate response from an Andreas Pereira free kick. In the second half, goals from Sturridge, Ojo (from the penalty spot) and newest signing Xherdan Shaqiri's bicycle kick on his debut gave Liverpool the 1–4 win.

On 4 August, Liverpool travelled to Ireland to defeat Napoli 5–0 with goals in the first half from Milner and Georginio Wijnaldum, then in the second half from Salah, Sturridge and Alberto Moreno.

Liverpool's final pre-season fixture was on 7 August in a rare preseason match at Anfield as hosts to Torino. Liverpool opened the scoring with goals from Roberto Firmino and Wijnaldum each scoring. Andrea Belotti answered with a header before the half, but Sturridge responded with another goal to a strong pre-season to give Liverpool the 3–1 victory in their final pre-season match.

=== August ===
Liverpool's opening Premier League fixture was at Anfield against West Ham United on 12 August. The Reds took a 2–0 half-time lead with goals from Salah and Mané, before the latter scored a seemingly offside goal to make it 3–0. In the final few minutes, Sturridge scored Liverpool's fourth and final goal with his first touch of the game, only 24 seconds after replacing Salah. The 4–0 win put Liverpool in first position of the league table for the first time since November 2016. The scoreline also meant that Liverpool became just the second club in Premier League history to score four or more goals in four consecutive games against a single opponent.

Liverpool's first away game of the league season was at Selhurst Park against Crystal Palace on 20 August. Initially, the game was an even contest before Liverpool were awarded a late first half penalty following a foul by former Liverpool player Mamadou Sakho on Salah. James Milner converted the penalty to give Liverpool the 0–1 lead at the half. The second half was equally even for the most part. However, at the very end, Palace defender Aaron Wan-Bissaka received a red card to give Liverpool a one-man advantage. Mané then scored a late second in stoppage time to eventually give Liverpool a 0–2 win.

Liverpool's final fixture of the month saw the team return to Anfield to take on Brighton & Hove Albion on 25 August. The visitors' resistance was broken in the 23rd minute when Salah put the Reds ahead 1–0 and the game went on to finish with no further changes to the scoreline. The win saw Liverpool take the maximum nine points from the first three league fixtures for the first time since the 2013–14 season.

=== September ===
Liverpool's next fixture was on 1 September against Leicester City. Liverpool took an early lead through a goal from Mané, which was then followed by Firmino's first goal of the season. His late first-half header to give the Reds a comfortable 2–0 lead at half-time. This was followed by a howler from goalkeeper Alisson, attempting to dribble the ball only to lose it to Kelechi Iheanacho, with Rachid Ghezzal then scoring into the empty net. Liverpool managed to survive the opposition's continued pressing and record a 2–1 win to maintain their 100% record start to the season. Liverpool's next fixture, which came after the international break, was on 15 September, away at Tottenham Hotspur, a team they had not beaten away from home since the 2014–15 season. The Reds took the lead in the 39th minute, with Wijnaldum scoring his first Premier League away goal for Liverpool. Firmino scored his second goal of the season to put the Reds 2–0 up. A late goal from Erik Lamela added drama to the match, but Liverpool held on to secure their fifth league win of the season and maintain their 100% record to the start of the season, with the result also meaning that this was the club's best start to a season since 1990. Also, the match was marked by Firmino's eye injury, sustained in a clash with Jan Vertonghen.

Liverpool's first UEFA Champions League match of the season was against Paris Saint Germain, the French champions, on 18 September. The Reds took the lead through a header from Sturridge, followed by a penalty from Milner, before Thomas Meunier scored to slightly decrease the margin to 2–1 at half-time. Teenager Kylian Mbappé scored in the last few minutes to make it 2–2 as he took advantage off a mistake from Salah. Firmino, who came on as a substitute just minutes before the equalizing goal, scored in the last few seconds of the game to win it 3–2 and open Liverpool's continental campaign with a win.

Liverpool's next game was against on 22 September, against Southampton. Liverpool took the lead through an own goal from Wesley Hoedt in the early minutes of the game, followed by a goal from Joël Matip just ten minutes after, with the Reds' third goal falling in the last minute of the first-half, with Shaqiri hitting the bar from a free-kick and Salah slotting in the goal, to win the game 3–0 for the Reds, as Liverpool won a seventh straight game in all competitions from the start of a season for the first time in 28 years.

Liverpool's next fixture was up against Chelsea on 26 September, in the Carabao Cup third round. The Reds initially took the lead through a goal from Sturridge, only for Emerson Palmieri to score the equaliser in the last ten minutes of the match, which was followed by Eden Hazard scoring a stunning goal in the final minutes of the match to give Chelsea the win and end Liverpool's unbeaten start to the season.

Three days later, on 29 September, the Reds once again played against Chelsea in the Premier League. A goal from Eden Hazard once again gave Chelsea the lead at half-time before Sturridge scored a magnificent late goal to share the points for both sides.

=== October ===
The Reds' next match was against Napoli in the Champions League at the Stadio San Paolo on 3 October. Liverpool struggled throughout the game, particularly in attack, where they failed to register a single shot on target for the first time since 2006. A goal from Lorenzo Insigne in the 90th minute finally would break the deadlock after Liverpool's defense stopped several chances. Following the defeat, manager Jürgen Klopp stated that the Reds "only had themselves to blame" for the loss.

Their final game before the international was against league champions Manchester City on 7 October, with plenty of hype ahead of the game. However, the match would eventually finish goalless as both teams' defences earned praise. The highlight of the match was Riyad Mahrez missing a penalty in the last few minutes of the game after Virgil van Dijk fouled Leroy Sané, with Mahrez skying the ball over the crossbar to mark a 0–0 draw. During the international break, the Reds would suffer several injury problems to key players, including Salah, Mané, Van Dijk and Keïta, though only the latter would be out for an extended period.

The Reds' first match following the international break was against Huddersfield Town on 20 October, and a third meeting between close friends Klopp and David Wagner. The Reds went ahead following Salah's strike in first half, as the game also marked the introduction of Fabinho, who made his Premier League debut after coming as a substitute in the 69th minute. Huddersfield has several attempts but were unable to score as Liverpool were able to hold on and win 1–0.

Liverpool's next match was a midweek Champions League fixture against Red Star Belgrade on 24 October. Following an initially close opening, the Reds went ahead through Roberto Firmino's goal in the 20th minute, which was followed by Salah's goal at the stroke of half-time. Salah scored his second goal from the penalty spot, which was his 50th goal for the club in all competition. Mané, after missing a penalty, scored to give Liverpool a 4–0 win, with the result, along with a 2–2 draw between Napoli and Paris Saint-Germain in the other group fixture, moving the Reds to top of their Champions League group.

Liverpool's next fixture was against Cardiff City on 27 October. The Reds went ahead with a goal from Salah in the tenth minute, but afterwards were unable to break Cardiff's defence before Mané scored to make it to 2–0 in the 66th minute, only for Callum Paterson to score in the 77th minute. Afterwards, Shaqiri scored his first goal for the club to make it 3–1, with Mané scoring three minutes later to make it 4–1 and temporarily move the Reds to the top of the table.

=== November ===
The Reds' next match was against Arsenal on 3 November. In a very close match, Milner scored his 50th Premier League goal to open a 1–0 lead for Liverpool in the 61st minute, following an error from goalkeeper Bernd Leno, though Alexandre Lacazette scored a late equaliser after he had taken the ball away from Alisson as the two sides shared a 1–1 draw.

Three days later, Liverpool played against Red Star Belgrade in the Champions League, with the Reds suffering a shock 2–0 defeat after two early goals from Milan Pavkov, with the defeat severely threatening Liverpool's qualification hopes.

The Reds' next fixture was against Fulham on 11 November. Following an unexpectedly close first-half, Salah scored just 14 seconds after Fulham scored a goal that was controversially considered offside. Shaqiri scored his second goal for the club in the second half as the Reds won 2–0 and temporarily return to the top of the league table.

Following the international break, Liverpool's next game was against Watford at Vicarage Road on 24 November. The Hornets scored inside the second minute, but Gerard Deulofeu's goal was flagged offside. After an initially close first half, Salah opened the scoring for Liverpool, which was then followed by a free-kick goal from Trent Alexander-Arnold, who scored his first goal of the season. In the last few minutes of game time, captain Jordan Henderson was sent off following a foul on Étienne Capoue, which resulted in his second yellow card and dismissal. A late header from Firmino was then enough to give Liverpool a 3–0 away win.

The final match of the month for Liverpool was an away trip to Paris Saint-Germain in the Champions League group stages. The hosts went ahead through a goal from Juan Bernat followed by a goal from Neymar to double the lead for the hosts. Despite a penalty from Milner, the Reds were unable to score an equalizer and left Parc des Princes without any points. The defeat would mean that Liverpool had to win either 1–0 or by two goals against Napoli in their final match to progress to the knockout stages of the competition.

=== December ===
In the last month of the calendar year, Liverpool played against city rivals Everton on 2 December. In a very tight and close game, several attempts on goal were made by both teams, with Alisson saving a header from André Gomes and Joe Gomez clearing the rebound and a shot from Gylfi Sigurðsson. In the final seconds of the game, Divock Origi scored his first goal for the club since May 2017, following a bizarre error from goalkeeper Jordan Pickford, to seal a dramatic 1–0 win for the Reds and extend Everton's winless run against Liverpool to 18 games.

In the midweek fixture on 5 December, the Reds played away against Burnley. The hosts took a surprise lead through Jack Cork after Alisson was unable to gather the ball following a Burnley corner. Liverpool would soon hit the equalizer through a superb low finish from Milner and soon after substitute Firmino scored with his first touch to overturn the result in Liverpool's favour, with Shaqiri scoring in added time just moments following a save from Alisson to seal a 3–1 win. The victory meant that Liverpool were unbeaten in their first 15 league games, the club's best ever league start in history.

In the weekend fixture of 8 December, Liverpool won 4–0 against Bournemouth with a hat-trick from Salah and an own goal from Steve Cook, to move top of the league table. The game was also marked by Milner making his 500th Premier League appearance.

The club's next game was a crucial tie against Napoli in their Champions League group fixture. Liverpool went ahead with a goal from Salah, which was followed by the hosts missing several clear attempts. In injury time, Arkadiusz Milik had a chance to equalize from eight yards away from goal, but his shot was denied by Alisson, who made a crucial save as Liverpool won 1–0 and qualified for the knockout phase.

In the next fixture on 16 December, Liverpool hosted fierce rivals Manchester United, who were in poor form but did not taste defeat against the Reds since March 2014. In the end, Liverpool emerged victorious. The hosts went ahead through a volley goal from Mané, before Jesse Lingard equalized following an error from goalkeeper Alisson. Substitute Shaqiri then scored twice in seven minutes to confirm a 3–1 victory for the Reds.

The following fixture was on 21 December, an away fixture against Wolverhampton Wanderers, resulting in a 2–0 win for the visitors. Salah scored the opening goal following a cross from Fabinho, with the Egyptian then assisting Van Dijk's goal, with the Dutchman scoring his first league goal for Liverpool. The result guaranteed that, regardless of other results, Liverpool would be top of the Premier League on Christmas Day, with Manchester City's unexpected home loss to Crystal Palace ensuring the Reds would be four points clear.

The traditional Boxing Day fixture saw Liverpool host Newcastle United and former manager Rafael Benítez. The hosts went ahead through a wonderful strike from Dejan Lovren, which was followed by a second-half penalty from Salah after the Egyptian was fouled by Paul Dummett, before Shaqiri's strike wrapped up the three points, with substitute Fabinho scoring his first goal for the club to complete a 4–0 victory. The result, coupled with other favourable results in the league, ensured that the Reds would go into their final game of 2018 six points clear, and would be top on New Year's Day.

Liverpool's final game of 2018 saw the Reds again at Anfield, this time hosting Arsenal just 56 days after the reverse fixture at the Emirates. Despite falling behind in the 11th minute to a goal from Gunners academy graduate Ainsley Maitland-Niles, a frantic spell just a couple of minutes later saw Liverpool go 2–1 up thanks to a Firmino brace, with Mané extending the lead in the 32nd minute and Salah again scoring from the penalty spot in the dying minutes of added time. Only one goal was scored in the second half, just after the hour mark, with Firmino completing his first ever Liverpool hat-trick from the penalty spot. With Tottenham Hotspur having lost 3–1 at home to Wolves in the earlier kick-off, the result saw the Reds go nine points clear at the top of the table, albeit the gap being then reduced to seven points by Manchester City's victory at Southampton the following day, with the club not only extending their unbeaten run in the league to 21 games, but also successfully going unbeaten at Anfield in the league in 2018, as well as equalling the record set by Rafael Benítez's team in 2008–09 of going unbeaten at Anfield in the league for 31 games.

=== January ===
Liverpool kicked off the new calendar year with a daunting trip to the Etihad to face Manchester City, knowing full well a win could see their lead extended to ten points. In a tight first half, Liverpool were denied the lead after a goal-line clearance by City defender John Stones, confirmed by goal-line technology before City captain Vincent Kompany controversially avoided a red card for a studs-up challenge on Salah, with Sergio Agüero opening the scoring for the champions in the 40th minute. Liverpool pulled themselves level in the second half, Firmino scoring after the hour mark, but Sané won the game for City just under ten minutes later. The defeat ended Liverpool's unbeaten start to the season and pulled City firmly back into the title race.

This match turned out to be Liverpool's only Premier League defeat in the 2018–19 season and in the 2019 calendar year.

The following fixture was again away at Wolves, this time in the 3rd round of the FA Cup. With the title challenge firmly on his mind, Klopp made nine changes to the team, with only Milner and Lovren keeping their places from the defeat at City, giving first-team debuts to academy graduates Curtis Jones and Rafa Camacho and starting Fabinho at centre-back alongside Dejan Lovren. However, barely five minutes into the game, Lovren was substituted off with a hamstring injury. His substitute, Ki-Jana Hoever (who had been signed for the academy in the summer), became the youngest-ever Liverpool player to debut for the first-team, at age 16. Wolves opened up the scoring on the 38th minute with Raúl Jiménez firing in on the counter. Much like at the Etihad, Liverpool pulled themselves level in the second half with Origi scoring in the 51st minute. However, Rúben Neves fired the home-side back ahead four minutes later with a terrific 31-yard shot. The West Midlands side could have even scored more, with Hoever making a fantastic last-ditch tackle to stop Jiménez closing in on goal with 15 minutes left. The result saw Liverpool eliminated from the Cup in the 3rd round for the first time since 2011 and eliminated by Wolves for the second time in three seasons.

Despite these results, there were positives for the club in the opening weeks of the month, with both Klopp and Van Dijk earning the Premier League Manager and Player of the Month awards, respectively, for December. Liverpool won all seven league games to go from second to first, while Van Dijk became the first league defender to win the award since 2013.

The Red's next league fixture was away at Brighton & Hove Albion, the Reds hoping to put the two previous defeats behind them. After a goal-less first half that saw the Reds fail to find a way past a stubborn Seagulls defence, a third Salah penalty in four league games in the 50th minute put the Reds ahead, a scoreline that stayed the same until full-time, sending Liverpool seven points clear at the top until the 14th at least.

For the next game, Liverpool welcomed former manager Roy Hodgson and Crystal Palace to Anfield — the Reds aware that victory could see them again go seven points clear of City, but also aware that Palace had won three of their five previous league visits and had also won at City just four weeks previously. The game remained even until just after the half-hour mark when Palace forward Andros Townsend controversially scored with the Eagles' first shot on goal, barely a few seconds after he escaped being penalised for a hand-ball in the Palace penalty area. Going one goal down into half-time, Liverpool came flying out in the second half with Salah scoring his 15th league goal of the season not even one minute into the half, with Firmino firing the home side into the lead just seven minutes later. However, Palace proved they were not down and out with James Tomkins pulling his side level just after the hour mark, only for Liverpool to restore their lead in the 78th minute through Salah. A second bookable offence for Milner saw the Reds down to ten men and their lead under threat before Mané scored in added time to put the game beyond Palace. Max Meyer's first Palace goal proved to be too late as Liverpool secured their 19th league win of the season and extended their unbeaten home league run to 32 matches, the longest since going over 60 home league matches unbeaten between 1978 and 1980 in the former First Division.

The Reds' next game came ten days later as a result of the FA Cup fourth round being played on the weekend of 26–27 January, with Leicester City welcomed to Anfield. Aware that Manchester City had lost the previous day at Newcastle United, Liverpool had the chance to extend their lead at the top of the table once again but were ultimately frustrated by a resilient Foxes side. Mané put the Reds ahead in the third minute only for Harry Maguire to head in an equalizer on the stroke of half-time just minutes after avoiding being sent off for being the last man on Mané. No goals were scored in the second half, with Leicester lucky to avoid conceding a penalty when Keïta was hauled down in the area.

=== February ===
Liverpool's first game of the month came against West Ham United at the Olympic Stadium and finished in a second successive 1–1 draw, with Michail Antonio scoring just before the 30-minute mark to cancel-out another Mané opener. This allowed Manchester City to go top of the league on goal difference with wins against Arsenal and Liverpool's archrivals Everton.

The Reds then bounced back with what ultimately proved to be an easy 3–0 win over Bournemouth at Anfield, with Mané and Wijnaldum scoring within ten minutes of each other in the first half and Salah adding the final goal just minutes after the start of the second half. With his goal, Salah became the first player since Luis Suárez to score at least 20 goals in successive seasons.

Ten days later, the Reds welcomed German giants Bayern Munich to Anfield for the first leg of the last-16 Champions League knockout stage. The match finished 0–0 with both sides having chances but ultimately seeing the German champions resort to damage limitation for the last half-hour with Liverpool more likely to score.

Liverpool's next match was away at Old Trafford to face rivals Manchester United, who had enjoyed an incredible resurgence under Norwegian interim manager Ole Gunnar Solskjær following his appointment after the club's loss at Anfield in December. The game finished 0–0, the Reds having put in a poor performance against a United side that made all three substitutions in the space of 25 minutes in the first half and lucky to avoid a late loss, as a Joël Matip own goal was disallowed.

With scrutiny increasing both on and off the pitch for their next match, a home match against Watford, Liverpool secured their largest victory of the season with a 5–0 win over the Hornets. Mané extended his impressive run of goals with a brace in the first half before Origi scored shortly after the hour mark to put the game beyond Watford. Van Dijk scored a late brace to keep the Reds one point clear of Manchester City and increase their goal difference.

=== March ===
On 3 March, Liverpool played out a goalless draw at Everton at Goodison Park. The Reds tested Toffies goalkeeper Jordan Pickford several times in the half but ultimately failed to really bring a good save out of him. With City having won at Bournemouth the previous day, the Reds lost their lead at the top of the table.

The following weekend, the Reds welcomed Burnley to Anfield, aware that only a win would be acceptable after City's win over Watford. However, the team got off to a poor start after Ashley Westwood scored directly from a corner after just six minutes, though replays revealed that Allison had been impeded by Clarets defender James Tarkowski in the build-up. Liverpool forced themselves back into the match 13 minutes later after Firmino took advantage of a fumbled shot from opposite goalkeeper Tom Heaton. Liverpool then took the lead just before the 30-minute mark through Mané. Firmino added his second goal of the match after the hour mark, again taking advantage of an error from Heaton, before Burnley pulled a second goal back in the first minute of added time through Icelandic midfielder Jóhann Berg Guðmundsson. However, Liverpool were not to be denied and deservedly won the match just two minutes later after Mané scored his second goal of the game. The victory ensured that the Reds remained just one point behind City with eight matches to play.

The next match saw Liverpool travel to Germany and the Allianz Arena for the second leg of their Champions League last-16 match against Bayern Munich. After an even 25-minute opening period, the Reds opened the scoring through Mané, who continued his fine scoring form with a fantastic finish that saw him manage to sidestep goalkeeper Manuel Neuer before firing into the goal. However, the German side fought back, levelling the score 13 minutes later through a Matip own goal, though the Reds would still be going through on away goals scored. Despite Bayern increasing the pressure in the second half, it was Liverpool who added to their lead through a Van Dijk header just before the 70-minute mark. Ten minutes later, Mané scored his second goal of the night to resolve the tie and send the Reds into the quarter-finals for the second-straight year and ensuring they would join fellow English sides Manchester City, Manchester United and Tottenham Hotspur in the draw. Just days later, the draw was made for both the quarter-finals and the semi-finals, with Liverpool being drawn with Porto for the second season running with the possibility of facing either Manchester United or Barcelona in the semi-finals.

In their final match before the international break, the Reds travelled back down to London to face strugglers Fulham at Craven Cottage, a match that saw the Merseyside club return to the top of the table with a 2–1 win. Despite putting in a poor performance and being pegged back to 1–1 with 15 minutes to play — Ryan Babel scoring against his former club after a mix-up between Allison and Van Dijk — a 26th-minute goal from Mané and then an 81st-minute penalty from Milner ensured all three points for the Reds.

The Reds' last match of the month saw them welcome Tottenham at Anfield, aware that the title race was really heating up and that any dropped points could see the club miss out once again on their first Premier League title. After an even start, Firmino ended his goalless run by smashing in a shot in the 16th minute to give his side the lead. Tottenham deservedly equalised in the 70th minute through Lucas Moura after a strong second half up to that point and looked set to earn a point. However, Belgian defender Toby Alderweireld inadvertently scored an own goal in the 90th minute to ensure Liverpool earned the win. The Reds went two points clear entering the last two months of the season.

=== April ===
For their first match of the penultimate month of the season, Liverpool travelled to St Mary's Stadium on the south-coast to face Southampton, who had largely picked up form since the reverse match in September in part thanks to the appointment of former RB Leipzig manager Ralph Hasenhuttl. The Saints scored first, with Shane Long netting in the ninth minute to put the Reds under pressure. However, their lead lasted for less than 30 minutes after Keïta scored his first Liverpool goal to pull the Merseyside club level, despite Salah appearing to be offside in the build-up. Despite attempts from Southampton to bring themselves back into the match, goals from Salah and Henderson — the former ending a nine-game drought and the latter scoring his first goal of the season — ultimately consigned the Saints to defeat and ensured Liverpool once again returned to the top of the table, albeit with Manchester City yet again having a game in hand. The result also mathematically ensured a top-four finish for the Reds and confirmed their place in the 2019–20 UEFA Champions League.

The Reds' next match came four days later as they hosted Porto in the first leg of their Champions League quarter-final draw. The result of the match was a comfortable 2–0 win for Liverpool, with Keïta scoring his second goal for the club in as many matches after just five minutes and Firmino doubling the lead just before the half-hour mark to give the side the advantage in the tie.

Liverpool then followed this up with arguably their toughest remaining league match of the season as they welcomed Chelsea to Anfield one day before the 30th anniversary of the Hillsborough disaster. After City comfortably won at Crystal Palace in the earlier Sunday kick-off, the pressure was on the home side to return to the top of the table against a Chelsea side who had not lost in any competition at Anfield since 2012. After a goal-less first half, Liverpool came firing out in the second and scored two quick-fire goals in succession, Mané heading the first goal in on the 51st minute mark and then Salah — just days after it had emerged that Chelsea fans in Prague had been recorded singing a racially discriminatory song about the Egyptian forward — scoring the second two minutes later, scoring a stunning goal into the top left corner of the net from 25 yards out. The scoreline remained the same until the final whistle, Chelsea going close twice through Eden Hazard but being unable to find the back of the net. The result once again saw Liverpool return to the top of the table.

The next match saw the Reds travel to Portugal for the second leg of their Champions League tie with Porto. Despite making a slow start and having to weather several Porto attacks, the team took the lead in the 28th minute through a Mané strike that appeared offside but was finally given by VAR. Salah scored the second goal in the second half only for defender Éder Militão to score for the home side just a couple of moments later. However, the match was finally put to bed by two headers, the first from Firmino and the second from Van Dijk, sending Liverpool into the semi-finals for the second season running to face Barcelona.

Liverpool's next match fell on Easter Sunday as they travelled to Wales to face Cardiff City, who had seen their battle to avoid relegation rejuvenated with an impressive away victory in their previous match which they won 2–0 away to Brighton & Hove Albion. After a goal-less first half that saw the Bluebirds deal with the attacking threat from the Reds very well, the away side finally got the goal they needed, Wijnaldum scoring with a wonderful finish in the 56th minute. Cardiff very nearly equalized after seven minutes only for captain Sean Morrison to miscue his header and send the ball wide. With less than ten minutes to play, Morrison proceeded to concede a penalty by holding onto Salah in the penalty area for a good couple of seconds, a penalty that Milner calmly converted. The match finished 2–0 to Liverpool, again sending them to the top of the table but for only a couple of days, with Manchester City winning 2–0 in the Manchester derby at Old Trafford on 24 April, two days before Liverpool's home match against already-relegated Huddersfield Town.

April came to an end on a high as Liverpool hosted already-relegated Huddersfield at Anfield, preparing for the first leg of their Champions League semi-final tie with a comfortable 5–0 win. Keïta started the scoring after just 15 seconds by taking advantage of a Huddersfield mishap, with Mané scoring the second goal in the 23rd minute and Salah securing the third goal in added time at the end of the first half. Only two goals were scored in the second hand, both Mané and Salah scoring their second goals of the match in the 55th and 82nd minute respectively, but it gave the Reds their 16th home league win of the season and extended their unbeaten Anfield league run to 39 matches. The squad received a further boost after midfielder Alex Oxlade-Chamberlain came on as a substitute in the second half after over a year out of play with a serious knee injury.

=== May ===
The Reds opened the final month of the season away at the Camp Nou to Barcelona on 1 May in the first leg of the Champions League semi-finals. In an initially close first 25 minutes, former Liverpool player Luis Suárez opened the scoring. The second half was dominated with continued attacking pressure from Liverpool, but no goals came until Lionel Messi scored from close range after Suárez had hit the bar. Only minutes later, Messi scored once again, this time a spectacular 30-yard free kick, as Barcelona completed a 3–0 victory.

Liverpool's next match was three days later on 4 May, away against Newcastle United in the Premier League. The Reds opened the scoring with a goal from Van Dijk, only for Christian Atsu to level the match a few minutes later, tapping home the rebound after Alexander-Arnold appeared to handle Salomón Rondón's shot on the goal-line. A goal from Salah just several minutes later restored their lead as the first half drew to a conclusion. Not long after the second half began, Salomón Rondón scored to bring the match level. Only minutes before the final whistle, substitute Origi headed in Shaqiri's free-kick as the Reds won 3–2, ensuring that the Premier League title race would go down to the final match.

Three days later, Liverpool faced Barcelona in the second leg of the Champions League semi-finals. Trailing with a 3–0 deficit and having had both Firmino and Salah injured prior to the game, many pundits and general media believed that it was highly unlikely for Liverpool to overturn the result. The Reds took the lead through Origi within a few minutes into the match and the score stayed as such once the first half concluded. In the second half, substitute Wijnaldum scored twice within the space of 122 seconds to even the tie. Ten minutes before the final whistle, Origi struck again following a quickly taken corner from Alexander-Arnold, completely overturning the tie into the Reds' favour as Liverpool won 4–0 to advance into their second successive Champions League Final and their third overall European final under Klopp.

Liverpool's final league match of the season was on 12 May against Wolverhampton Wanderers. As title rivals Manchester City were playing at the same time against Brighton & Hove Albion, the Reds required a miracle in order to claim the league title. However, despite winning 2–0 with both goals from Mané, they ultimately finished in second place as City easily won their match 4–1, with the Reds being just one point away from winning their first league title in 29 years. Liverpool's total of 97 points was the highest number of points a second-placed team had ever finished with in the Premier League and in any of Europe's top league flights.

=== June ===
On 1 June, in their second successive Champions League Final, Liverpool defeated fellow English club Tottenham Hotspur 2–0 to secure a sixth European Cup victory and the club's first since 2005. Just over a minute in Liverpool were awarded a penalty after Moussa Sissoko was judged to have handled Mané's cross. Salah then scored from the spot to give the Reds the lead after just two minutes. Liverpool had some good chances to score, with Alexander-Arnold and Milner shooting just wide of the post in either half. At the other end Alisson made two great saves, notably to deny Christian Eriksen after the latter's free-kick was pushed away by the Liverpool keeper. Then with just three minutes left, a poorly cleared corner found Origi just inside the penalty-area and he scored into the bottom right corner of the net to win the trophy for Klopp's team.

== First-team squad ==
| Squad no. | Player | Nationality | Position(s) | Date of birth | Signed from | Apps | Goals | Assists |
Goalkeepers
| 13 | Alisson Becker | (Brazil) | GK | 2 October 1992 (aged 26) | (Italy) Roma | 51 | 0 | 0 |
| 22 | Simon Mignolet | (Belgium) | GK | 6 March 1988 (aged 31) | (England) Sunderland | 204 | 0 | 0 |
| 62 | Caoimhín Kelleher | (Republic of Ireland) | GK | 23 November 1998 (aged 20) | (England) LFC Academy | 0 | 0 | 0 |
Defenders
| 4 | Virgil van Dijk (3rd captain) | (Netherlands) | CB | 8 July 1991 (aged 27) | (England) Southampton | 72 | 7 | 4 |
| 6 | Dejan Lovren | (Croatia) | CB | 5 July 1989 (aged 29) | (England) Southampton | 170 | 7 | 3 |
| 12 | Joe Gomez | (England) | CB/RB | 23 May 1997 (aged 22) | (England) Charlton Athletic | 66 | 0 | 3 |
| 18 | Alberto Moreno | (Spain) | LB/LWB | 5 July 1992 (aged 26) | (Spain) Sevilla | 141 | 3 | 11 |
| 26 | Andy Robertson | (Scotland) | LB/LWB | 11 March 1994 (aged 25) | (England) Hull City | 78 | 1 | 18 |
| 32 | Joël Matip | (Cameroon) | CB | 8 August 1991 (aged 27) | (Germany) Schalke 04 | 98 | 3 | 1 |
| 47 | Nat Phillips | (England) | CB | 21 March 1997 (aged 22) | (England) LFC Academy | 0 | 0 | 0 |
| 66 | Trent Alexander-Arnold | (England) | RB/RWB | 7 October 1998 (aged 20) | (England) LFC Academy | 85 | 4 | 19 |
Midfielders
| 3 | Fabinho | (Brazil) | DM/RB/CB | 23 October 1993 (aged 25) | (France) Monaco | 41 | 1 | 2 |
| 5 | Georginio Wijnaldum | (Netherlands) | CM/DM | 11 November 1990 (aged 28) | (England) Newcastle United | 139 | 13 | 15 |
| 7 | James Milner (vice-captain) | (England) | DM/CM/LB/RB | 4 January 1986 (aged 33) | (England) Manchester City | 177 | 22 | 35 |
| 8 | Naby Keïta | (Guinea) | CM/AM | 10 February 1995 (aged 24) | (Germany) RB Leipzig | 33 | 3 | 1 |
| 14 | Jordan Henderson (captain) | (England) | DM/CM | 17 June 1990 (aged 29) | (England) Sunderland | 324 | 25 | 43 |
| 20 | Adam Lallana | (England) | CM/AM | 10 May 1988 (aged 31) | (England) Southampton | 156 | 21 | 19 |
| 21 | Alex Oxlade-Chamberlain | (England) | CM/AM/RW | 15 August 1993 (aged 25) | (England) Arsenal | 44 | 5 | 8 |
| 23 | Xherdan Shaqiri | (Switzerland) | AM/RW/LW | 10 October 1991 (aged 27) | (England) Stoke City | 30 | 6 | 5 |
| 48 | Curtis Jones | (England) | CM/RW | 30 January 2001 (aged 18) | (England) LFC Academy | 1 | 0 | 0 |
| 58 | Ben Woodburn | (Wales) | CM/RW/LW | 15 October 1999 (aged 19) | (England) LFC Academy | 11 | 1 | 0 |
| 64 | Rafael Camacho | (Portugal) | CM/RW/LW | 22 May 2000 (aged 19) | (England) LFC Academy | 2 | 0 | 0 |
Forwards
| 9 | Roberto Firmino | (Brazil) | ST/AM | 2 October 1991 (aged 27) | (Germany) 1899 Hoffenheim | 192 | 66 | 41 |
| 10 | Sadio Mané | (Senegal) | LW/RW/ST | 10 April 1992 (aged 27) | (England) Southampton | 123 | 59 | 18 |
| 11 | Mohamed Salah | (Egypt) | RW/ST | 15 June 1992 (aged 27) | (Italy) Roma | 104 | 71 | 24 |
| 15 | Daniel Sturridge | (England) | ST | 1 September 1989 (aged 29) | (England) Chelsea | 160 | 67 | 20 |
| 24 | Rhian Brewster | (England) | ST | 1 April 2000 (aged 19) | (England) LFC Academy | 0 | 0 | 0 |
| 27 | Divock Origi | (Belgium) | ST | 18 April 1995 (aged 24) | (France) Lille | 98 | 28 | 7 |

=== New contracts ===
| Date | Pos. | No. | Player | Ref. |
|---|---|---|---|---|
| 7 June 2018 | MF | 53 | (England) Ovie Ejaria | |
| 2 July 2018 | FW | 11 | (Egypt) Mohamed Salah | |
| 10 July 2018 | FW | 59 | (Wales) Harry Wilson | |
| 17 July 2018 | FW | — | (Nigeria) Taiwo Awoniyi | |
| 17 July 2018 | FW | 24 | (England) Rhian Brewster | |
| 25 July 2018 | MF | — | (Brazil) Allan | |
| 19 August 2018 | MF | 16 | (Serbia) Marko Grujić | |
| 30 August 2018 | MF | 54 | (England) Sheyi Ojo | |
| 30 August 2018 | GK | 62 | (Republic of Ireland) Caoimhín Kelleher | |
| 3 September 2018 | MF | 14 | (England) Jordan Henderson | |
| 22 November 2018 | FW | 10 | (Senegal) Sadio Mané | |
| 10 December 2018 | DF | 12 | (England) Joe Gomez | |
| 17 January 2019 | DF | 26 | (Scotland) Andy Robertson | |
| 19 January 2019 | DF | 66 | (England) Trent Alexander-Arnold | |

== Transfers and loans ==
=== Transfers in ===
| Entry date | Position | No. | Player | From club | Fee | Ref. |
|---|---|---|---|---|---|---|
| 1 July 2018 | MF | 8 | (Guinea) Naby Keïta | (Germany) RB Leipzig | £52,750,000 | |
| 1 July 2018 | MF | 3 | (Brazil) Fabinho | (France) Monaco | £39,000,000 (Note: Fee may eventually rise to £43,000,000.) | |
| 13 July 2018 | FW | 23 | (Switzerland) Xherdan Shaqiri | (England) Stoke City | £13,500,000 | |
| 19 July 2018 | GK | 13 | (Brazil) Alisson Becker | (Italy) Roma | £55,500,000 (Note: Fee may eventually rise to £64,400,000.) | |
| Total | | | | | £160,750,000 | |

=== Transfers out ===
| Exit date | Position | No. | Player | To club | Fee | Ref. |
|---|---|---|---|---|---|---|
| 1 July 2018 | MF | 23 | (Germany) Emre Can | (Italy) Juventus | Released | |
| 1 July 2018 | DF | 38 | (England) Jon Flanagan | (Scotland) Rangers | Released | |
| 1 July 2018 | MF | 49 | (Wales) Jordan Williams | (England) Rochdale | Released | |
| 20 July 2018 | GK | 52 | (Wales) Danny Ward | (England) Leicester City | £12,500,000 | |
| 17 August 2018 | DF | 17 | (Estonia) Ragnar Klavan | (Italy) Cagliari | £2,000,000 | |
| 4 January 2019 | FW | 29 | (England) Dominic Solanke | (England) Bournemouth | £19,000,000 (Note: Fee may eventually rise to £25,000,000.) | |
| 31 January 2019 | MF | 50 | (Serbia) Lazar Marković | (England) Fulham | Free | |
| Total | | | | | £33,500,000 | |

=== Loans out ===
| Start date | End date | Position | No. | Player | To club | Fee | Ref. |
|---|---|---|---|---|---|---|---|
| 1 July 2018 | 15 December 2018 | MF | 53 | (England) Ovie Ejaria | (Scotland) Rangers | None | |
| 2 July 2018 | End of season | GK | 34 | (Hungary) Ádám Bogdán | (Scotland) Hibernian | None | |
| 17 July 2018 | End of season | MF | 59 | (Wales) Harry Wilson | (England) Derby County | £1,000,000 | |
| 20 July 2018 | End of season | FW | 40 | (England) Ryan Kent | (Scotland) Rangers | None | |
| 23 July 2018 | 11 January 2019 | FW | — | (Nigeria) Taiwo Awoniyi | (Belgium) Gent | None | |
| 25 July 2018 | 14 February 2019 | MF | — | (Brazil) Allan | (Germany) Eintracht Frankfurt | None | |
| 25 July 2018 | 9 January 2019 | FW | 58 | (Wales) Ben Woodburn | (England) Sheffield United | None | |
| 9 August 2018 | End of season | FW | 28 | (England) Danny Ings | (England) Southampton | None | |
| 19 August 2018 | End of season | MF | 16 | (Serbia) Marko Grujić | (Germany) Hertha BSC | £900,000 | |
| 23 August 2018 | 14 January 2019 | DF | 56 | (England) Connor Randall | (England) Rochdale | None | |
| 25 August 2018 | Two seasons | GK | 1 | (Germany) Loris Karius | (Turkey) Beşiktaş | £2,250,000 | |
| 30 August 2018 | End of season | MF | 54 | (England) Sheyi Ojo | (France) Stade Reims | None | |
| 4 January 2019 | End of season | DF | 2 | (England) Nathaniel Clyne | (England) Bournemouth | None | |
| 6 January 2019 | End of season | GK | 73 | (Poland) Kamil Grabara | (Denmark) AGF | None | |
| 7 January 2019 | End of season | MF | 53 | (England) Ovie Ejaria | (England) Reading | None | |
| 11 January 2019 | End of season | FW | — | (Nigeria) Taiwo Awoniyi | (Belgium) Royal Excel Mouscron | None | |
| 31 January 2019 | End of season | MF | 68 | (Spain) Pedro Chirivella | (Spain) Extremadura | None | |
| 15 February 2019 | 31 December 2019 | MF | — | (Brazil) Allan | (Brazil) Fluminense | None | |

=== Transfer summary ===
Spending

Summer: ▼£ 160,750,000

Winter: £ 0

Total: ▼£ 160,750,000

Income

Summer: ▲£ 18,650,000

Winter: ▲£ 19,000,000

Total: ▲£ 37,650,000

Net Expenditure

Summer: ▼£ 142,100,000

Winter: ▲£ 19,000,000

Total: ▼£ 123,100,000

== Friendlies ==
Liverpool revealed pre-season fixtures against Chester, Tranmere Rovers, Bury, Blackburn Rovers, Napoli and Torino. They also competed in the International Champions Cup against Borussia Dortmund, Manchester City and Manchester United.

=== Pre-season ===
Win Draw Loss

| 7 July 2018 Friendly | Chester | 0–7 | Liverpool | Chester, England |
| 15:00 BST | | Report | Wilson 38', 45'; Milner 48' (pen.); Sturridge 54', 89'; Kent 56'; Ings 79' | Stadium: Deva Stadium; Attendance: 4,396; Referee: Robert Jones |

| 10 July 2018 Friendly | Tranmere Rovers | 2–3 | Liverpool | Birkenhead, England |
| 19:30 BST | Smith 72'; Soukouna 81' | Report | Camacho 7'; Ojo 27'; Lallana 33' | Stadium: Prenton Park; Referee: Mike Dean |

| 14 July 2018 Friendly | Bury | 0–0 | Liverpool | Bury, England |
| 15:00 BST | | Report | | Stadium: Gigg Lane; Attendance: 6,852; Referee: Darren Handley |

| 19 July 2018 Friendly | Blackburn Rovers | 0–2 | Liverpool | Blackburn, England |
| 19:45 BST | | Report | Marković 64'; Sturridge 73' | Stadium: Ewood Park; Attendance: 14,620; Referee: Jon Moss |

| 4 August 2018 Friendly | Liverpool | 5–0 | Napoli | Dublin, Republic of Ireland |
| 18:00 BST | Milner 4'; Wijnaldum 9'; Salah 58'; Sturridge 73'; Moreno 77' | Report | | Stadium: Aviva Stadium; Attendance: 51,512; Referee: Robert Hennessy (Ireland) |

| 7 August 2018 Friendly | Liverpool | 3–1 | Torino | Liverpool, England |
| 19:30 BST | Fabinho (penalty missed) 17'; Firmino 21'; Wijnaldum 24'; Sturridge 87' | Report | Belotti 31' | Stadium: Anfield; Attendance: 40,278; Referee: Michael Oliver (England) |

==== International Champions Cup ====
| 22 July 2018 Friendly | Liverpool | 1–3 | Borussia Dortmund | Charlotte, United States |
| 21:05 BST | Van Dijk 25' | Report | Pulisic 66' (pen.), 89'; Bruun Larsen 90+3' | Stadium: Bank of America Stadium; Attendance: 55,447; Referee: Allen Chapman (United States) |

| 26 July 2018 Friendly | Manchester City | 1–2 | Liverpool | East Rutherford, United States |
| 01:05 BST | Sané 57'; Gomes (yellow card) 85' | Report | Van Dijk (yellow card) 30'; Salah 63'; Mané 90+4' (pen.) | Stadium: MetLife Stadium; Attendance: 52,635; Referee: Sorin Stoica (United States) |

| 28 July 2018 Friendly | Manchester United | 1–4 | Liverpool | Ann Arbor, United States |
| 22:05 BST | A. Pereira 31' | Report | Mané 28' (pen.); Fabinho (yellow card) 48'; Sturridge 66'; Ojo 74' (pen.); Shaqiri 82' | Stadium: Michigan Stadium; Attendance: 101,254; Referee: Ismail Elfath (United States) |

== Competitions ==
Win Draw Loss

=== Overall ===
| Competition | Started round | Final position / round | First match | Last match |
|---|---|---|---|---|
| Premier League | — | 2nd | 12 August 2018 | 12 May 2019 |
| FA Cup | Third round | Third round | 7 January 2019 | |
| EFL Cup | Third round | Third round | 26 September 2018 | |
| UEFA Champions League | Group stage | Winners | 18 September 2018 | 1 June 2019 |

Source: Competitions

=== Overview ===
| Competition | Record | | | | | | | |
| Competition | G | W | D | L | GF | GA | GD | Win % |
|---|---|---|---|---|---|---|---|---|
| Premier League | 38 | 30 | 7 | 1 | 89 | 22 | +67 | 78.95 |
| FA Cup | 1 | 0 | 0 | 1 | 1 | 2 | −1 | 0.00 |
| EFL Cup | 1 | 0 | 0 | 1 | 1 | 2 | −1 | 0.00 |
| UEFA Champions League | 13 | 8 | 1 | 4 | 24 | 12 | +12 | 61.54 |
| Total | 53 | 38 | 8 | 7 | 115 | 38 | +77 | 71.70 |

Source: Competitions

=== Premier League ===
==== League table ====
| Pos | Team | Pld | W | D | L | GF | GA | GD | Pts | Qualification or relegation |
|---|---|---|---|---|---|---|---|---|---|---|
| 1 | Manchester City (C) | 38 | 32 | 2 | 4 | 95 | 23 | +72 | 98 | Qualification to Champions League group stage |
| 2 | Liverpool | 38 | 30 | 7 | 1 | 89 | 22 | +67 | 97 | Qualification to Champions League group stage |
| 3 | Chelsea | 38 | 21 | 9 | 8 | 63 | 39 | +24 | 72 | Qualification to Champions League group stage |
| 4 | Tottenham Hotspur | 38 | 23 | 2 | 13 | 67 | 39 | +28 | 71 | Qualification to Champions League group stage |
| 5 | Arsenal | 38 | 21 | 7 | 10 | 73 | 51 | +22 | 70 | Qualification to Europa League group stage (Note: Since the winners of the EFL Cup and the FA Cup, Manchester City, qualified for the Champions League, the spot given to the FA Cup winners (Europa League group stage) was passed to the sixth-placed team and the spot given to the League Cup winners (Europa League second qualifying round) was passed to the seventh-placed team.) |

Source: Premier League
Rules for classification: 1) Points; 2) Goal difference; 3) Goals scored; 4) Play-offs (only if needed to decide champion, teams for relegation or teams for UEFA competitions).
(C) Champions

==== Results summary ====
| Overall | | | | | | | | Home | | | | | | Away | | | | | |
| Pld | W | D | L | GF | GA | GD | Pts | W | D | L | GF | GA | GD | W | D | L | GF | GA | GD |
|---|---|---|---|---|---|---|---|---|---|---|---|---|---|---|---|---|---|---|---|
| 38 | 30 | 7 | 1 | 89 | 22 | +67 | 97 | 17 | 2 | 0 | 55 | 10 | +45 | 13 | 5 | 1 | 34 | 12 | +22 |

Source: Premier League

==== Results by matchday ====
| Matchday | 1 | 2 | 3 | 4 | 5 | 6 | 7 | 8 | 9 | 10 | 11 | 12 | 13 | 14 | 15 | 16 | 17 | 18 | 19 | 20 | 21 | 22 | 23 | 24 | 25 | 26 | 27 | 28 | 29 | 30 | 31 | 32 | 33 | 34 | 35 | 36 | 37 | 38 |
|---|---|---|---|---|---|---|---|---|---|---|---|---|---|---|---|---|---|---|---|---|---|---|---|---|---|---|---|---|---|---|---|---|---|---|---|---|---|---|
| Ground | H | A | H | A | A | H | A | H | A | H | A | H | A | H | A | A | H | A | H | H | A | A | H | H | A | H | A | H | A | H | A | H | A | H | A | H | A | H |
| Result | W | W | W | W | W | W | D | D | W | W | D | W | W | W | W | W | W | W | W | W | L | W | W | D | D | W | D | W | D | W | W | W | W | W | W | W | W | W |
| Position | 1 | 2 | 1 | 1 | 2 | 1 | 2 | 3 | 2 | 2 | 3 | 2 | 2 | 2 | 2 | 1 | 1 | 1 | 1 | 1 | 1 | 1 | 1 | 1 | 1 | 1 | 1 | 1 | 2 | 2 | 2 | 2 | 2 | 2 | 2 | 2 | 2 | 2 |
| Points | 3 | 6 | 9 | 12 | 15 | 18 | 19 | 20 | 23 | 26 | 27 | 30 | 33 | 36 | 39 | 42 | 45 | 48 | 51 | 54 | 54 | 57 | 60 | 61 | 62 | 65 | 66 | 69 | 70 | 73 | 76 | 79 | 82 | 85 | 88 | 91 | 94 | 97 |

Source: 11v11
A = Away; H = Home; W = Win; D = Draw; L = Loss

==== Matches ====
On 14 June 2018, the Premier League fixtures for the forthcoming season were announced.

| 12 August 2018 1 | Liverpool | 4–0 | West Ham United | Liverpool |
| 13:30 BST | Salah 19'; Alexander-Arnold (yellow card) 21'; Mané 45+2', 53'; Sturridge 88' | Report | Antonio (yellow card) 52'; Balbuena (yellow card) 55' | Stadium: Anfield; Attendance: 53,235; Referee: Anthony Taylor |

| 20 August 2018 2 | Crystal Palace | 0–2 | Liverpool | Selhurst |
| 20:00 BST | Van Aanholt (yellow card) 42'; Wan-Bissaka (red card) 75' | Report | Milner 45' (pen.); Alexander-Arnold (yellow card) 52'; Mané 90+3' | Stadium: Selhurst Park; Attendance: 25,750; Referee: Michael Oliver |

| 25 August 2018 3 | Liverpool | 1–0 | Brighton & Hove Albion | Liverpool |
| 17:30 BST | Salah 23'; Alexander-Arnold (yellow card) 77' | Report | Balogun (yellow card) 59' | Stadium: Anfield; Attendance: 53,294; Referee: Chris Kavanagh |

| 1 September 2018 4 | Leicester City | 1–2 | Liverpool | Leicester |
| 12:30 BST | Ghezzal (yellow card) 61', (goal) 63'; Mendy (yellow card) 88'; Ndidi (yellow card) 90+5' | Report | Mané 10'; Firmino 45'; Van Dijk (yellow card) 55'; Milner (yellow card) 90+3' | Stadium: King Power Stadium; Attendance: 32,149; Referee: Paul Tierney |

| 15 September 2018 5 | Tottenham Hotspur | 1–2 | Liverpool | Wembley |
| 12:30 BST | Lamela 90+3' | Report | Wijnaldum 39'; Firmino 54' | Stadium: Wembley Stadium; Attendance: 80,188; Referee: Michael Oliver |

| 22 September 2018 6 | Liverpool | 3–0 | Southampton | Liverpool |
| 15:00 BST | Hoedt 10' (o.g.); Matip 21'; Salah 45+3' | Report | Romeu (yellow card) 34'; Lemina (yellow card) 56' | Stadium: Anfield; Attendance: 53,457; Referee: Paul Tierney |

| 29 September 2018 7 | Chelsea | 1–1 | Liverpool | Fulham |
| 17:30 BST | Hazard 25' | Report | Mané (yellow card) 39'; Milner (yellow card) 77'; Sturridge 89' | Stadium: Stamford Bridge; Attendance: 40,625; Referee: Andre Marriner |

| 7 October 2018 8 | Liverpool | 0–0 | Manchester City | Liverpool |
| 16:30 BST | Wijnaldum (yellow card) 90' | Report | B. Silva (yellow card) 21'; Agüero (yellow card) 56'; Mendy (yellow card) 64'; Mahrez (penalty missed) 86' | Stadium: Anfield; Attendance: 52,117; Referee: Martin Atkinson |

| 20 October 2018 9 | Huddersfield Town | 0–1 | Liverpool | Huddersfield |
| 17:30 BST | | Report | Salah 24'; Lallana (yellow card) 36'; Sturridge (yellow card) 76' | Stadium: John Smith's Stadium; Attendance: 24,263; Referee: Michael Oliver |

| 27 October 2018 10 | Liverpool | 4–1 | Cardiff City | Liverpool |
| 15:00 BST | Salah 10'; Mané 66', 87'; Shaqiri 84' | Report | Paterson 77' | Stadium: Anfield; Attendance: 53,373; Referee: Stuart Attwell |

| 3 November 2018 11 | Arsenal | 1–1 | Liverpool | Holloway |
| 17:30 GMT | Lacazette 82', (yellow card) 83' | Report | Fabinho (yellow card) 52'; Milner 61' | Stadium: Emirates Stadium; Attendance: 59,993; Referee: Andre Marriner |

| 11 November 2018 12 | Liverpool | 2–0 | Fulham | Liverpool |
| 12:00 GMT | Salah 41'; Shaqiri 53'; Gomez (yellow card) 77' | Report | Chambers (yellow card) 59' | Stadium: Anfield; Attendance: 53,128; Referee: Paul Tierney |

| 24 November 2018 13 | Watford | 0–3 | Liverpool | Watford |
| 15:00 GMT | | Report | Henderson (yellow card) 60' (yellow-red card) 82'; Salah 67'; Alexander-Arnold 76'; Firmino 89' | Stadium: Vicarage Road; Attendance: 20,540; Referee: Jon Moss |

| 2 December 2018 14 | Liverpool | 1–0 | Everton | Liverpool |
| 16:15 GMT | Shaqiri (yellow card) 33'; Fabinho (yellow card) 77'; Gomez (yellow card) 80'; Origi 90+6' | Report | Gomes (yellow card) 88'; Sigurðsson (yellow card) 90' | Stadium: Anfield; Attendance: 51,756; Referee: Chris Kavanagh |

| 5 December 2018 15 | Burnley | 1–3 | Liverpool | Burnley |
| 19:45 GMT | Cork 54'; Vydra (yellow card) 86' | Report | Milner 62'; Firmino 69'; Shaqiri 90+1' | Stadium: Turf Moor; Attendance: 21,741; Referee: Stuart Attwell |

| 8 December 2018 16 | Bournemouth | 0–4 | Liverpool | Bournemouth |
| 12:30 GMT | Aké (yellow card) 12'; Lerma (yellow card) 15' | Report | Salah 25', 48', 77'; S. Cook 68' (o.g.); Fabinho (yellow card) 70' | Stadium: Dean Court; Attendance: 10,752; Referee: Lee Mason |

| 16 December 2018 17 | Liverpool | 3–1 | Manchester United | Liverpool |
| 16:00 GMT | Mané 24'; Shaqiri 73', 80' | Report | Lingard 33'; Dalot (yellow card) 26'; Lingard (yellow card) 33'; Lukaku (yellow card) 40' | Stadium: Anfield; Attendance: 52,908; Referee: Martin Atkinson |

| 21 December 2018 18 | Wolverhampton Wanderers | 0–2 | Liverpool | Wolverhampton |
| 20:00 GMT | | Report | Salah 18'; Van Dijk 68' | Stadium: Molineux Stadium; Attendance: 31,358; Referee: Craig Pawson |

| 26 December 2018 19 | Liverpool | 4–0 | Newcastle United | Liverpool |
| 15:00 GMT | Lovren 11'; Salah 47' (pen.); Shaqiri 79'; Fabinho 85' | Report | | Stadium: Anfield; Attendance: 53,318; Referee: Graham Scott |

| 29 December 2018 20 | Liverpool | 5–1 | Arsenal | Liverpool |
| 17:30 GMT | Firmino 14', 16', 65' (pen.); Robertson (yellow card) 26'; Mané 32'; Salah 45+2' (pen.) | Report | Maitland-Niles 11'; Xhaka (yellow card) 33'; Papastathopoulos (yellow card) 90+2' | Stadium: Anfield; Attendance: 53,326; Referee: Michael Oliver |

| 3 January 2019 21 | Manchester City | 2–1 | Liverpool | Manchester |
| 20:00 GMT | Kompany (yellow card) 31'; Agüero 40'; Laporte (yellow card) 45+2'; Sané 72'; B. Silva (yellow card) 89'; Ederson (yellow card) 90+5' | Report | Lovren (yellow card) 20'; Wijnaldum (yellow card) 38'; Firmino 64' | Stadium: Etihad Stadium; Attendance: 54,511; Referee: Anthony Taylor |

| 12 January 2019 22 | Brighton & Hove Albion | 0–1 | Liverpool | Brighton and Hove |
| 15:00 GMT | | Report | Salah 50' (pen.) | Stadium: Falmer Stadium; Attendance: 30,682; Referee: Kevin Friend |

| 19 January 2019 23 | Liverpool | 4–3 | Crystal Palace | Liverpool |
| 15:00 GMT | Salah 46', 75'; Firmino 53'; Milner (yellow card) 82' (yellow-red card) 89'; Mané 90+3' | Report | Townsend 34'; J. Ayew (yellow card) 42'; Tomkins 65'; Meyer 90+5' | Stadium: Anfield; Attendance: 53,171; Referee: Jon Moss |

| 30 January 2019 24 | Liverpool | 1–1 | Leicester City | Liverpool |
| 20:00 GMT | Mané 3'; Matip (yellow card) 16' | Report | Maguire (yellow card) 41', (goal) 45+2'; Pereira (yellow card) 50'; Chilwell (yellow card) 90+4' | Stadium: Anfield; Attendance: 53,092; Referee: Martin Atkinson |

| 4 February 2019 25 | West Ham United | 1–1 | Liverpool | Stratford |
| 20:00 GMT | Antonio 28'; Hernández (yellow card) 60' | Report | Mané 22'; Matip (yellow card) 54' | Stadium: London Stadium; Attendance: 59,903; Referee: Kevin Friend |

| 9 February 2019 26 | Liverpool | 3–0 | Bournemouth | Liverpool |
| 15:00 GMT | Mané 24'; Wijnaldum 34'; Salah 48'; Matip (yellow card) 61'; Robertson (yellow card) 87' | Report | Rico (yellow card) 25'; Smith (yellow card) 38' | Stadium: Anfield; Attendance: 53,178; Referee: Anthony Taylor |

| 24 February 2019 27 | Manchester United | 0–0 | Liverpool | Manchester |
| 14:05 GMT | Young (yellow card) 81' | Report | Milner (yellow card) 23'; Shaqiri (yellow card) 83'; Wijnaldum (yellow card) 90' | Stadium: Old Trafford; Attendance: 74,519; Referee: Michael Oliver |

| 27 February 2019 28 | Liverpool | 5–0 | Watford | Liverpool |
| 20:00 GMT | Mané 9', 20'; Origi 66'; Van Dijk 79', 82' | Report | Cathcart (yellow card) 79'; Masina (yellow card) 82' | Stadium: Anfield; Attendance: 53,316; Referee: Graham Scott |

| 3 March 2019 29 | Everton | 0–0 | Liverpool | Liverpool |
| 16:15 GMT | Walcott (yellow card) 7' | Report | Robertson (yellow card) 75'; Fabinho (yellow card) 79' | Stadium: Goodison Park; Attendance: 39,335; Referee: Martin Atkinson |

| 10 March 2019 30 | Liverpool | 4–2 | Burnley | Liverpool |
| 12:00 GMT | Alisson (yellow card) 8'; Firmino 19', 68'; Mané 29', 90+3'; Fabinho (yellow card) 71' | Report | Westwood 6'; Guðmundsson 90+1' | Stadium: Anfield; Attendance: 53,310; Referee: Andre Marriner |

| 17 March 2019 31 | Fulham | 1–2 | Liverpool | Fulham |
| 14:15 GMT | Anguissa (yellow card) 65'; Babel 74'; Bryan (yellow card) 90+4' | Report | Mané 26'; Fabinho (yellow card) 39'; Milner 81' (pen.) | Stadium: Craven Cottage; Attendance: 25,043; Referee: Craig Pawson |

| 31 March 2019 32 | Liverpool | 2–1 | Tottenham Hotspur | Liverpool |
| 16:30 BST | Firmino 16'; Alderweireld 90' (o.g.) | Report | Lucas 70', (yellow card) 80' | Stadium: Anfield; Attendance: 53,322; Referee: Martin Atkinson |

| 5 April 2019 33 | Southampton | 1–3 | Liverpool | Southampton |
| 20:00 BST | Long 9'; Bednarek (yellow card) 48'; Bertrand (yellow card) 75' | Report | Keïta 36'; Salah 80', (yellow card) 81'; Henderson 86', (yellow card) 90+1'; Robertson (yellow card) 89'; Mané (yellow card) 90+4' | Stadium: St Mary's Stadium; Attendance: 31,797; Referee: Paul Tierney |

| 14 April 2019 34 | Liverpool | 2–0 | Chelsea | Liverpool |
| 16:30 BST | Mané 51'; Salah 53' | Report | Azpilicueta (yellow card) 44' | Stadium: Anfield; Attendance: 53,279; Referee: Michael Oliver |

| 21 April 2019 35 | Cardiff City | 0–2 | Liverpool | Cardiff |
| 16:00 BST | Gunnarsson (yellow card) 80' | Report | Wijnaldum 57'; Milner 81' (pen.), (yellow card) 90+1' | Stadium: Cardiff City Stadium; Attendance: 33,082; Referee: Martin Atkinson |

| 26 April 2019 36 | Liverpool | 5–0 | Huddersfield Town | Liverpool |
| 20:00 BST | Keïta 1'; Mané 23', 66'; Salah 45+1', 83' | Report | | Stadium: Anfield; Attendance: 53,249; Referee: Kevin Friend |

| 4 May 2019 37 | Newcastle United | 2–3 | Liverpool | Newcastle upon Tyne |
| 19:45 BST | Atsu 20'; Schär (yellow card) 45+2'; Rondón 54' | Report | Van Dijk 13'; Salah 28'; Origi 86'; Milner (yellow card) 90+2' | Stadium: St James' Park; Attendance: 52,206; Referee: Andre Marriner |

| 12 May 2019 38 | Liverpool | 2–0 | Wolverhampton Wanderers | Liverpool |
| 15:00 BST | Mané 17', 81' | Report | Bennett (yellow card) 49'; Jota (yellow card) 50' | Stadium: Anfield; Attendance: 53,331; Referee: Martin Atkinson |

=== FA Cup ===
The third round draw was made live on BBC by Ruud Gullit and Paul Ince from Stamford Bridge on 3 December 2018.

| 7 January 2019 Third round | Wolverhampton Wanderers | 2–1 | Liverpool | Wolverhampton |
| 19:45 GMT | Jiménez 38'; Neves 55' | Report | Milner (yellow card) 15'; Origi 51' | Stadium: Molineux Stadium; Attendance: 25,849; Referee: Paul Tierney |

=== EFL Cup ===
The third round draw was made on 30 August 2018 by David Seaman and Joleon Lescott.

| 26 September 2018 Third round | Liverpool | 1–2 | Chelsea | Liverpool |
| 19:45 BST | Milner (yellow card) 21'; Matip (yellow card) 26'; Sturridge 58'; Fabinho (yellow card) 56'; Keïta (yellow card) 78'; Henderson (yellow card) 90' | Report | Kovačić (yellow card) 50'; Emerson 79'; Hazard 85'; Moses (yellow card) 90+1'; Morata (yellow card) 90+5' | Stadium: Anfield; Attendance: 45,503; Referee: Kevin Friend |

=== UEFA Champions League ===
==== Group stage ====
The group stage draw was held on 30 August 2018. Liverpool were drawn into Group C alongside Paris Saint-Germain, Napoli and Red Star Belgrade.

| Pos | Team | Pld | W | D | L | GF | GA | GD | Pts | Qualification | PAR | LIV | NAP | RSB |
|---|---|---|---|---|---|---|---|---|---|---|---|---|---|---|
| 1 | (France) Paris Saint-Germain | 6 | 3 | 2 | 1 | 17 | 9 | +8 | 11 | Advance to knockout phase | — | 2–1 | 2–2 | 6–1 |
| 2 | (England) Liverpool | 6 | 3 | 0 | 3 | 9 | 7 | +2 | 9 (Note: Goals in all group matches: Liverpool 9, Napoli 7.) | Advance to knockout phase | 3–2 | — | 1–0 | 4–0 |
| 3 | (Italy) Napoli | 6 | 2 | 3 | 1 | 7 | 5 | +2 | 9 | Transfer to Europa League | 1–1 | 1–0 | — | 3–1 |
| 4 | (Serbia) Red Star Belgrade | 6 | 1 | 1 | 4 | 5 | 17 | −12 | 4 | | 1–4 | 2–0 | 0–0 | — |

Source: UEFA
Rules for classification: Group stage tiebreakers
Notes:

| Round | 1 | 2 | 3 | 4 | 5 | 6 |
|---|---|---|---|---|---|---|
| Ground | H | A | H | A | A | H |
| Result | W | L | W | L | L | W |
| Position | 1 | 2 | 1 | 2 | 3 | 2 |
| Points | 3 | 3 | 6 | 6 | 6 | 9 |

Source: UEFA
A = Away; H = Home; W = Win; D = Draw; L = Loss

Win Draw Loss Fixtures

| 18 September 2018 1 | Liverpool (England) | 3–2 | (France) Paris Saint-Germain | Liverpool, England |
| 20:00 BST | Van Dijk (yellow card) 27'; Sturridge 30'; Milner 36' (pen.); Firmino 90+2' | Report | Meunier 40', (yellow card) 45+1'; Mbappé 83' | Stadium: Anfield; Attendance: 52,478; Referee: Cüneyt Çakır (Turkey) |

| 3 October 2018 2 | Napoli (Italy) | 1–0 | (England) Liverpool | Naples, Italy |
| 21:00 CEST | Koulibaly (yellow card) 25'; Insigne 90' | Report | Milner (yellow card) 45+2' | Stadium: Stadio San Paolo; Attendance: 37,057; Referee: Viktor Kassai (Hungary) |

| 24 October 2018 3 | Liverpool (England) | 4–0 | (Serbia) Red Star Belgrade | Liverpool, England |
| 20:00 BST | Firmino 20'; Salah 45', 51' (pen.); Mané (penalty missed) 76', 80' | Report | Stojković (yellow card) 50'; Krstičić (yellow card) 55'; Jovičić (yellow card) 74'; Jovančić (yellow card) 86'; Gobeljić (yellow card) 88' | Stadium: Anfield; Attendance: 53,024; Referee: Daniel Siebert (Germany) |

| 6 November 2018 4 | Red Star Belgrade (Serbia) | 2–0 | (England) Liverpool | Belgrade, Serbia |
| 18:55 CET | Marin (yellow card) 6'; Pavkov 22', 29' | Report | Lallana (yellow card) 36' | Stadium: Red Star Stadium; Attendance: 51,318; Referee: Antonio Mateu Lahoz (Spain) |

| 28 November 2018 5 | Paris Saint-Germain (France) | 2–1 | (England) Liverpool | Paris, France |
| 21:00 CET | Bernat 13'; Verratti (yellow card) 24'; Neymar 37', (yellow card) 90+4' | Report | Wijnaldum (yellow card) 17'; Gomez (yellow card) 34'; Milner 45+1' (pen.); Sturridge (yellow card) 84'; Van Dijk (yellow card) 90+1'; Robertson (yellow card) 90+3'; Keïta (yellow card) 90+5' | Stadium: Parc des Princes; Attendance: 46,880; Referee: Szymon Marciniak (Poland) |

| 11 December 2018 6 | Liverpool (England) | 1–0 | (Italy) Napoli | Liverpool, England |
| 20:00 GMT | Van Dijk (yellow card) 13'; Salah 34', (yellow card) 83'; Robertson (yellow card) 90+1'; Mané (yellow card) 90+3' | Report | Koulibaly (yellow card) 40' | Stadium: Anfield; Attendance: 52,015; Referee: Damir Skomina (Slovenia) |

==== Knockout phase ====
===== Round of 16 =====
The round of 16 draw was held on 17 December 2018. Liverpool were drawn against German champions Bayern Munich, first leg at home then second leg away.

| 19 February 2019 First leg | Liverpool (England) | 0–0 | (Germany) Bayern Munich | Liverpool, England |
| 20:00 GMT | Henderson (yellow card) 55' | Report | Kimmich (yellow card) 28' | Stadium: Anfield; Attendance: 52,250; Referee: Gianluca Rocchi (Italy) |

| 13 March 2019 Second leg | Bayern Munich (Germany) | 1–3 (1–3 agg.) | (England) Liverpool | Munich, Germany |
| 21:00 CET | Matip 39' (o.g.); Thiago (yellow card) 65'; Sanches (yellow card) 83' | Report | Mané 26', 84'; Fabinho (yellow card) 43'; Matip (yellow card) 63'; Van Dijk 69'; Robertson (yellow card) 90+2' | Stadium: Allianz Arena; Attendance: 68,145; Referee: Daniele Orsato (Italy) |

===== Quarter-finals =====
The quarter-finals was held on 15 March 2019. Liverpool were drawn against Portuguese champions Porto, first leg at home then second leg away.

| 9 April 2019 First leg | Liverpool (England) | 2–0 | (Portugal) Porto | Liverpool, England |
| 20:00 BST | Keïta 5'; Firmino 26' | Report | Soares (yellow card) 17'; Felipe (yellow card) 61' | Stadium: Anfield; Attendance: 52,465; Referee: Antonio Mateu Lahoz (Spain) |

| 17 April 2019 Second leg | Porto (Portugal) | 1–4 (1–6 agg.) | (England) Liverpool | Porto, Portugal |
| 20:00 WEST | Pepe (yellow card) 36'; Militão 69' | Report | Mané 26', (yellow card) 32'; Salah 65'; Firmino 77'; Van Dijk 84' | Stadium: Estádio do Dragão; Attendance: 49,117; Referee: Danny Makkelie (Netherlands) |

===== Semi-finals =====
The semi-finals draw was held on 15 March 2019. Liverpool were drawn against Spanish champions Barcelona, first leg away then second leg at home.

| 1 May 2019 First leg | Barcelona (Spain) | 3–0 | (England) Liverpool | Barcelona, Spain |
| 21:00 CEST | Suárez 26', (yellow card) 81'; Lenglet (yellow card) 39'; Messi 75', 82'; Alba (yellow card) 86' | Report | Fabinho (yellow card) 81' | Stadium: Camp Nou; Attendance: 98,299; Referee: Björn Kuipers (Netherlands) |

| 7 May 2019 Second leg | Liverpool (England) | 4–0 (4–3 agg.) | (Spain) Barcelona | Liverpool, England |
| 20:00 BST | Origi 7', 79'; Fabinho (yellow card) 11'; Wijnaldum 54', 56'; Matip (yellow card) 66' | Report | Busquets (yellow card) 45+1'; Rakitić (yellow card) 53'; Semedo (yellow card) 75' | Stadium: Anfield; Attendance: 52,212; Referee: Cüneyt Çakır (Turkey) |

===== Final =====
| 1 June 2019 Final | Tottenham Hotspur (England) | 0–2 | (England) Liverpool | Madrid, Spain |
| 21:00 CEST | | Report | Salah 2' (pen.); Origi 87' | Stadium: Metropolitano Stadium; Attendance: 63,272; Referee: Damir Skomina (Slovenia) |

== Squad statistics ==
=== Appearances ===
Players with no appearances are not included on the list.

| No. | Pos. | Nat. | Player | Premier League | | FA Cup | | EFL Cup | | Champions League | | Total | |
| No. | Pos. | Nat. | Player | Apps | Starts | Apps | Starts | Apps | Starts | Apps | Starts | Apps | Starts |
|---|---|---|---|---|---|---|---|---|---|---|---|---|---|
| 3 | MF | (Brazil) | Fabinho | 28 | 21 | 1 | 1 | 1 | 1 | 11 | 7 | 41 | 30 |
| 4 | DF | (Netherlands) | Virgil van Dijk | 38 | 38 | 0 | 0 | 0 | 0 | 12 | 12 | 50 | 50 |
| 5 | MF | (Netherlands) | Georginio Wijnaldum | 35 | 32 | 0 | 0 | 0 | 0 | 12 | 11 | 47 | 43 |
| 6 | DF | (Croatia) | Dejan Lovren | 13 | 11 | 1 | 1 | 1 | 1 | 3 | 2 | 18 | 15 |
| 7 | MF | (England) | James Milner | 31 | 19 | 1 | 1 | 1 | 1 | 12 | 10 | 45 | 31 |
| 8 | MF | (Guinea) | Naby Keïta | 25 | 16 | 1 | 1 | 1 | 1 | 6 | 4 | 33 | 22 |
| 9 | FW | (Brazil) | Roberto Firmino | 34 | 31 | 1 | 0 | 1 | 0 | 12 | 8 | 48 | 39 |
| 10 | FW | (Senegal) | Sadio Mané | 36 | 35 | 0 | 0 | 1 | 1 | 13 | 13 | 50 | 49 |
| 11 | FW | (Egypt) | Mohamed Salah | 38 | 37 | 1 | 0 | 1 | 0 | 12 | 12 | 52 | 49 |
| 12 | DF | (England) | Joe Gomez | 16 | 12 | 0 | 0 | 0 | 0 | 9 | 5 | 25 | 17 |
| 13 | GK | (Brazil) | Alisson | 38 | 38 | 0 | 0 | 0 | 0 | 13 | 13 | 51 | 51 |
| 14 | MF | (England) | Jordan Henderson | 32 | 21 | 0 | 0 | 1 | 0 | 11 | 8 | 44 | 29 |
| 15 | FW | (England) | Daniel Sturridge | 18 | 4 | 1 | 1 | 1 | 1 | 7 | 2 | 27 | 8 |
| 18 | DF | (Spain) | Alberto Moreno | 2 | 2 | 1 | 1 | 1 | 1 | 1 | 0 | 5 | 4 |
| 20 | MF | (England) | Adam Lallana | 13 | 5 | 0 | 0 | 0 | 0 | 3 | 1 | 16 | 6 |
| 21 | MF | (England) | Alex Oxlade-Chamberlain | 2 | 0 | 0 | 0 | 0 | 0 | 0 | 0 | 2 | 0 |
| 22 | GK | (Belgium) | Simon Mignolet | 0 | 0 | 1 | 1 | 1 | 1 | 0 | 0 | 2 | 2 |
| 23 | MF | (Switzerland) | Xherdan Shaqiri | 24 | 11 | 1 | 1 | 1 | 1 | 4 | 2 | 30 | 15 |
| 26 | DF | (Scotland) | Andy Robertson | 36 | 36 | 0 | 0 | 0 | 0 | 12 | 12 | 48 | 48 |
| 27 | FW | (Belgium) | Divock Origi | 11 | 3 | 1 | 1 | 0 | 0 | 8 | 2 | 20 | 6 |
| 32 | DF | (Cameroon) | Joël Matip | 22 | 17 | 0 | 0 | 1 | 1 | 8 | 8 | 31 | 26 |
| 48 | MF | (England) | Curtis Jones | 0 | 0 | 1 | 1 | 0 | 0 | 0 | 0 | 1 | 1 |
| 51 | DF | (Netherlands) | Ki-Jana Hoever | 0 | 0 | 1 | 0 | 0 | 0 | 0 | 0 | 1 | 0 |
| 64 | DF | (Portugal) | Rafael Camacho | 1 | 0 | 1 | 1 | 0 | 0 | 0 | 0 | 2 | 1 |
| 66 | DF | (England) | Trent Alexander-Arnold | 29 | 27 | 0 | 0 | 0 | 0 | 11 | 11 | 40 | 38 |
Players who went out on loan or left permanently but made appearances for Liverpool prior to departing
| 2 | DF | (England) | Nathaniel Clyne | 4 | 1 | 0 | 0 | 1 | 1 | 0 | 0 | 5 | 2 |

=== Goalscorers ===
Includes all competitive matches.

| Rank | Pos. | No. | Player | Premier League | FA Cup | EFL Cup | Champions League | Total |
|---|---|---|---|---|---|---|---|---|
| 1 | FW | 11 | (Egypt) Mohamed Salah | 22 | 0 | 0 | 5 | 27 |
| 2 | FW | 10 | (Senegal) Sadio Mané | 22 | 0 | 0 | 4 | 26 |
| 3 | FW | 9 | (Brazil) Roberto Firmino | 12 | 0 | 0 | 4 | 16 |
| 4 | MF | 7 | (England) James Milner | 5 | 0 | 0 | 2 | 7 |
| 4 | FW | 27 | (Belgium) Divock Origi | 3 | 1 | 0 | 3 | 7 |
| 6 | DF | 4 | (Netherlands) Virgil van Dijk | 4 | 0 | 0 | 2 | 6 |
| 6 | MF | 23 | (Switzerland) Xherdan Shaqiri | 6 | 0 | 0 | 0 | 6 |
| 8 | MF | 5 | (Netherlands) Georginio Wijnaldum | 3 | 0 | 0 | 2 | 5 |
| 9 | FW | 15 | (England) Daniel Sturridge | 2 | 0 | 1 | 1 | 4 |
| 10 | MF | 8 | (Guinea) Naby Keïta | 2 | 0 | 0 | 1 | 3 |
| 11 | MF | 3 | (Brazil) Fabinho | 1 | 0 | 0 | 0 | 1 |
| 11 | DF | 6 | (Croatia) Dejan Lovren | 1 | 0 | 0 | 0 | 1 |
| 11 | MF | 14 | (England) Jordan Henderson | 1 | 0 | 0 | 0 | 1 |
| 11 | DF | 32 | (Cameroon) Joël Matip | 1 | 0 | 0 | 0 | 1 |
| 11 | DF | 66 | (England) Trent Alexander-Arnold | 1 | 0 | 0 | 0 | 1 |
| Own goals | | | | 3 | 0 | 0 | 0 | 3 |
| Total | | | | 89 | 1 | 1 | 24 | 115 |

=== Clean sheets ===
| No. | Player | Premier League | Champions League | Total |
|---|---|---|---|---|
| 13 | (Brazil) Alisson Becker | 21 | 6 | 27 |
| Total | | 21 | 6 | 27 |

=== Disciplinary record ===
| No. | Pos. | Name | Premier League | | FA Cup | | EFL Cup | | Champions League | | Total | |
| No. | Pos. | Name | Yellow card | Red card | Yellow card | Red card | Yellow card | Red card | Yellow card | Red card | Yellow card | Red card |
|---|---|---|---|---|---|---|---|---|---|---|---|---|
| 3 | MF | (Brazil) Fabinho | 6 | 0 | 0 | 0 | 1 | 0 | 3 | 0 | 10 | 0 |
| 4 | DF | (Netherlands) Virgil van Dijk | 1 | 0 | 0 | 0 | 0 | 0 | 3 | 0 | 4 | 0 |
| 5 | MF | (Netherlands) Georginio Wijnaldum | 3 | 0 | 0 | 0 | 0 | 0 | 1 | 0 | 4 | 0 |
| 6 | DF | (Croatia) Dejan Lovren | 1 | 0 | 0 | 0 | 0 | 0 | 0 | 0 | 1 | 0 |
| 7 | MF | (England) James Milner | 7 | 1 | 1 | 0 | 1 | 0 | 1 | 0 | 10 | 1 |
| 8 | MF | (Guinea) Naby Keïta | 0 | 0 | 0 | 0 | 1 | 0 | 1 | 0 | 2 | 0 |
| 10 | FW | (Senegal) Sadio Mané | 2 | 0 | 0 | 0 | 0 | 0 | 1 | 0 | 3 | 0 |
| 11 | FW | (Egypt) Mohamed Salah | 1 | 0 | 0 | 0 | 0 | 0 | 1 | 0 | 2 | 0 |
| 12 | DF | (England) Joe Gomez | 2 | 0 | 0 | 0 | 0 | 0 | 1 | 0 | 3 | 0 |
| 13 | GK | (Brazil) Alisson Becker | 1 | 0 | 0 | 0 | 0 | 0 | 0 | 0 | 1 | 0 |
| 14 | MF | (England) Jordan Henderson | 3 | 1 | 0 | 0 | 1 | 0 | 1 | 0 | 5 | 1 |
| 15 | FW | (England) Daniel Sturridge | 1 | 0 | 0 | 0 | 0 | 0 | 1 | 0 | 2 | 0 |
| 20 | MF | (England) Adam Lallana | 1 | 0 | 0 | 0 | 0 | 0 | 1 | 0 | 2 | 0 |
| 23 | MF | (Switzerland) Xherdan Shaqiri | 2 | 0 | 0 | 0 | 0 | 0 | 0 | 0 | 2 | 0 |
| 26 | DF | (Scotland) Andy Robertson | 4 | 0 | 0 | 0 | 0 | 0 | 3 | 0 | 7 | 0 |
| 32 | DF | (Cameroon) Joël Matip | 3 | 0 | 0 | 0 | 1 | 0 | 2 | 0 | 6 | 0 |
| 66 | DF | (England) Trent Alexander-Arnold | 3 | 0 | 0 | 0 | 0 | 0 | 0 | 0 | 3 | 0 |
| Total | | | 41 | 2 | 1 | 0 | 5 | 0 | 17 | 0 | 67 | 2 |

== Awards ==
=== End-of-season club awards ===
Due to Liverpool's busy schedule the club decided not to hold their annual Players' Awards. The 2019 Liverpool F.C. Players’ Award winners were announced on 27 May after an online vote.

- Standard Chartered Bank First Team Player of the Year: Virgil van Dijk
- First Team Players’ Player of the Year: Virgil van Dijk
- First Team Goal of the Season: Mohamed Salah (vs. Chelsea, 14 April 2019)

=== Liverpool Standard Chartered Player of the Month award ===
Awarded monthly to the player that was chosen by fans voting on Liverpoolfc.com

| Month | Player | Ref |
|---|---|---|
| August | (Netherlands) Virgil van Dijk | |
| September | (England) Daniel Sturridge | |
| October | (Egypt) Mohamed Salah | |
| November | (England) Trent Alexander-Arnold | |
| December | (Egypt) Mohamed Salah | |
| January | (Senegal) Sadio Mané | |
| February | (Netherlands) Virgil van Dijk | |
| March | (Senegal) Sadio Mané | |
| April | (Egypt) Mohamed Salah | |

=== Other awards ===
Mohamed Salah and Sadio Mané shared the Premier League Golden Boot with Arsenal's Pierre-Emerick Aubameyang, scoring 22 league goals apiece; goalkeeper Alisson Becker kept 21 clean sheets to win the Premier League Golden Glove; and four Liverpool players were included in the PFA Team of the Year, including Virgil van Dijk, who won both the PFA Players' Player of the Year and Premier League Player of the Season awards. Four Liverpool players were in the Ballon d'Or top-seven. Van Dijk was named as runner-up, Mané placed fourth, Salah fifth and Alisson seventh, while Alisson also won the inaugural Yashin Trophy, presented to the best performing goalkeeper.

At The Best FIFA Football Awards, Van Dijk and Alisson were named in the FIFA FIFPro Men's World XI, with Alisson being named as The Best FIFA Men's Goalkeeper, Van Dijk finishing as runner-up for The Best FIFA Men's Player and manager Jürgen Klopp being named as The Best FIFA Men's Coach. At the UEFA Club Football Awards, Alisson was named as the UEFA Goalkeeper of the Season, and Van Dijk was named as the UEFA Defender of the Season and awarded the UEFA Men's Player of the Year Award. Six Liverpool players featured in the 20-man UEFA Squad of the Season.
