= Steve Walsh (scout) =

English football scout

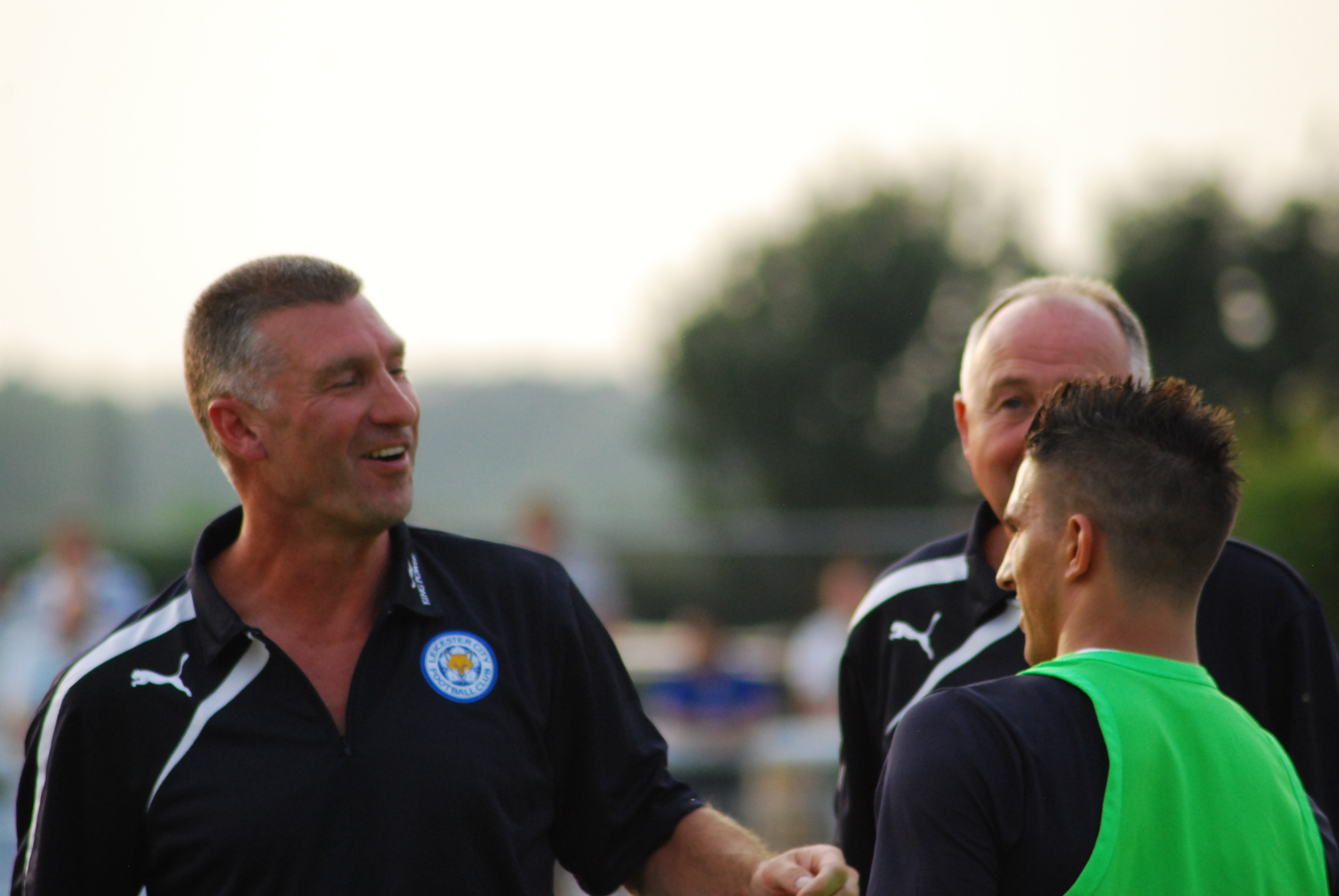
Walsh (right, partially obscured) with Nigel Pearson at Leicester City, 2013

Steve Walsh is an English football scout who is currently Special Advisor at Major League Soccer club Charlotte FC. He previously worked for teams including Chelsea, Leicester City, and Everton. He was credited with bringing key players to Leicester to help them win the Premier League in 2016.

== Early life ==
Walsh was born in Chorley, Lancashire to Irish parents. His brother Mickey played as a forward for the Republic of Ireland and clubs including Blackpool, Everton and Porto. Their cousin Michael played Gaelic football for Mayo.

== Career ==
Walsh did his coaching badges in the 1970s and worked as a physical education teacher at Bishop Rawstorne High School while scouting for, in order, Bury, Chester City and Chelsea. While at Chelsea, he scouted Gianfranco Zola and Didier Drogba, both of whom went on to have successful careers at the club.

In 2006, he left for the chief scout role at Newcastle United, where he met Nigel Pearson. He followed Pearson to Leicester City in 2008 and Hull City two years later, and then accompanied him on his return to Leicester, whereby he was made assistant manager. After Pearson was sacked in 2015, the club's board retained all of his staff, including Walsh.

Walsh scouted obscure players such as Riyad Mahrez, Jamie Vardy and N'Golo Kanté for Leicester, and their contribution to the club's success in the 2015–16 season ostensibly led Arsenal to express an interest for his services. He had a £1 million release clause written into his contract. On 8 May 2016, a few days after the club secured their maiden Premier League title, both Walsh and assistant manager Craig Shakespeare agreed to extend their contracts with Leicester City.

On 21 July 2016, he returned to his native North West England, joining Everton as Director of Football, signed by their new majority shareholder Farhad Moshiri.

In November 2017, Walsh's job was reported as under pressure. Everton had spent £150 million on new players over the summer but found themselves in danger of relegation and were eliminated from the UEFA Europa League. In addition to the expensive players that Everton signed, Walsh also recommended Hull duo Andy Robertson and Harry Maguire for a combined £20 million and teenage Norwegian striker Erling Haaland for €4 million; Everton rejected the trio, whose values soared years later. On 16 May 2018, Walsh was relieved of his duties, being replaced by Marcel Brands.

In March 2020, Walsh was named Special Advisor at Major League Soccer club Charlotte FC.
