= Andy Robertson =

Scottish footballer (born 1994)

Andy Robertson MBE
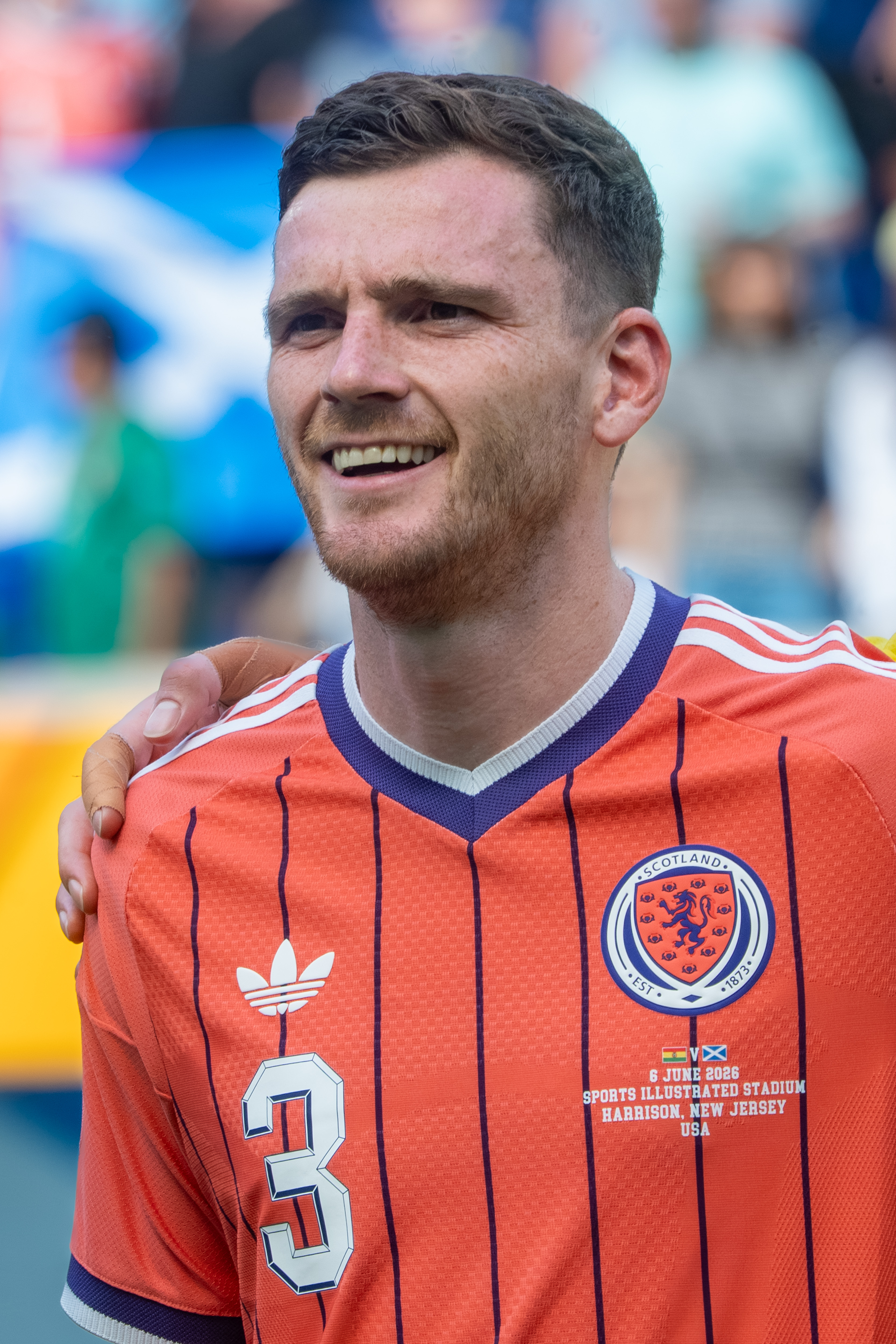
- Robertson with Scotland in 2026

Personal information
- Full name: Andrew Henry Robertson
- Date of birth: 11 March 1994 (age 32)
- Place of birth: Glasgow, Scotland
- Height: 5 ft 10 in (1.78 m)
- Position: Left-back

Team information
- Current team: Tottenham Hotspur
- Number: 3

Youth career
- 2003–2009: Celtic
- 2009–2012: Queen's Park

Senior career*
Years	Team	Apps	(Gls)
2012–2013	Queen's Park	34	(2)
2013–2014	Dundee United	36	(3)
2014–2017	Hull City	99	(3)
2017–2026	Liverpool	275	(11)
2026–	Tottenham Hotspur	10	(0)

International career^{‡}
2013–2015	Scotland U21	4	(0)
2014–	Scotland	103	(4)
- * Club domestic league appearances and goals as of 20:15, 21 November 2026 (UTC) ‡ National team caps and goals as of 22:30, 16 November 2026 (UTC)

Andrew Henry Robertson (born 11 March 1994) is a Scottish professional footballer who plays as a left-back for Premier League club Tottenham Hotspur and captains the Scotland national team.

Robertson began his senior career in 2012 with one season at then-amateur Queen's Park. In his season at Dundee United, he was runner up in the 2013–14 Scottish Cup. He was named PFA Scotland Young Player of the Year and in the PFA Scotland Team of the Year, before joining Premier League side Hull City in July 2014 for a fee of £2.85 million. Robertson was relegated, promoted and then relegated again in his three seasons at Hull City.

Robertson joined Liverpool in July 2017 for an undisclosed fee, believed to be an initial total of £8 million. His honours with Liverpool include winning the 2018–19 UEFA Champions League, the 2019–20 Premier League, the 2019 UEFA Super Cup, the 2019 FIFA Club World Cup and a 2021–22 season EFL Cup and FA Cup domestic double. The 2022 FA Community Shield win meant, at that stage, he had won one each of the complete set of all seven first tier trophies available to Liverpool. He has since won a second EFL Cup (2024) and Premier League title (2025) with Liverpool.

Robertson was named in the PFA Team of the Year in 2018–19 and 2019–20. His first UEFA individual award was inclusion in their 2018 Champions League breakthrough team. UEFA also named him in both their Champions League Team of the Season and their fans' Team of the Year in 2019. He was again named in their Champions League Team of the Season for the 2021–22 season.

Robertson made his international debut for the Scotland senior team in May 2014. He was appointed captain in September 2018, and has led his country at UEFA Euro 2020, Euro 2024 and the 2026 FIFA World Cup. With 103 caps, Robertson is the highest capped player for Scotland, surpassing Kenny Dalglish's long standing record in November 2026. He is also the highest-capped player to serve as Scotland captain. On his 90th cap in November 2025, Robertson led his country to a first World Cup qualification since 1998 following a 4–2 victory against Denmark.

== Early life and career ==
Robertson was born in Glasgow to parents Brian and Pauline. He has an elder brother named Stephen. He is of Irish descent via his Glenfarne-born grandmother.

Robertson's father Brian grew up on Maryhill's Wyndford estate. A tenacious amateur player nicknamed "Pop" after Pop Robson, Brian was a childhood friend of footballers Jim Duffy and Charlie Nicholas. However a spinal injury required Brian to wear a back brace, preventing a sporting career. Robertson later said of Stephen as an amateur footballer, "He didn't move much, he was a bit of a static striker but scored a lot of goals."

Robertson attended St Ninian's High School in Giffnock, East Renfrewshire, from 2006 to 2012. There he captained the football team. He was also the junior captain of his local golf club in Glasgow.

Robertson played for Giffnock Soccer Centre, and then joined the youth set up at Celtic, the team he supported as a boy. Celtic Head of Youth, Chris McCart, then released him aged 15 in 2009, considering him too small. That was despite John Gallagher who had coached Robertson at under-14 and under-15, lobbying for Robertson.

== Club career ==
=== Queen's Park ===
Gallagher recommended Robertson to Queen's Park, located conveniently for Robertson and his family in Glasgow's South side. In their youth setup he was nurtured by key figures such as head of youth David McCallum and technical director Andy McGlennan, who encouraged Robertson's switch to left-back from a more advanced position.

Manager Gardner Speirs called Robertson up to the Queen's Park first team at the start of season 2012–13. On 28 July 2012, 18-year-old Robertson made his senior football debut. That was in Queen's Park's Scottish Challenge Cup penalty shoot out win at Berwick Rangers. The match attendance was 372. He scored his first senior goal when losing 2–1 at home to East Stirlingshire on 13 November 2012.

Queen's Park were still an amateur club at the time, so players were only paid expenses. Robertson posted on social media in August 2012, "Life at this age is rubbish with no money. #needajob." As a part-time footballer, Robertson trained/played 3 evenings per week plus Saturday afternoons. Robertson did work as a telephone service recipient for ticket bookings at Hampden Park where Queen's Park were based. At lunch time he used the gym facilities there to bulk up. He took a part-time Christmas job on the tills at Marks and Spencer on Sauchiehall Street in Glasgow. He also did landscaping work. He later commented on that season with Queen's Park, "I did apply for a couple of uni courses, but by the January or February of the season I knew at the end of the season there was going to be at least two options of full-time football. I knew I could put that (university) on the backburner and I was at least going to have a crack at it (professional football)." Robertson's career plan should he have followed his brother in studying at university, was to teach PE.

Rangers having gone into administration the season before, had been placed in the same division as Queen's Park that season; the lowest of Scotland's four senior football divisions. Robertson later commented, "We also played at a full Ibrox – 50,000 – and it was a great experience. We got beaten 2–0 but it was tight until the 87th minute. I missed a glorious chance which I'm always reminded of by old teammates."

Robertson made 43 appearances that season, more than any other player in the squad. Queen's Park finished third in the 2012–13 Scottish Third Division, qualifying for the end of season play-offs. Queen's Park lost the home first leg 1–0 to a second-half stoppage time, Peterhead penalty by Andy Rodgers. Lawrence Shankland scored the 87th minute Queen's Park goal, losing the away leg 3–1.

=== Dundee United ===
19-year-old Robertson and his Queen's Park teammate Aidan Connolly, signed for Scottish Premiership side Dundee United on 3 June 2013. Robertson replaced departing Barry Douglas, who had made the same move three years earlier. Having had requests ignored for a transfer fee for Douglas, Queen's Park (then an amateur club) protested at the prospect of more players departing to United for free. The two clubs agreed a deal involving a percentage of future transfers, later benefiting Queen's with £300 000.

Jackie McNamara was Robertson's manager at Dundee United. Robertson later remarked, "Jackie McNamara had been a great full-back [at Celtic] and he helped me." Robertson later also said John Rankin, "effectively talked me through games in my first three months." Rankin also conscientiously covered the spaces left when Robertson went on an attacking run.

Robertson debuted for United in an opening day of the league season 0–0 draw at Partick Thistle. On 22 September 2013, Robertson scored his first Dundee United goal, drawing 2–2 at home with Motherwell. He ran from his own half before sending a low left-foot drive in to the goal from 22 yards. Soon afterwards he agreed a new contract with United, until May 2016. He was voted SPFL young player of the month for September 2013 and player of the month for November 2013.

As well as Robertson, other recent and/or future full Scotland internationalists in that 2013–14 Dundee United squad were Stuart Armstrong, Gary Mackay-Steven, Mark Wilson, Ryan Gauld and John Souttar. On 12 April 2014, Robertson played in the Scottish Cup 3–1 semi-final win versus Rangers at Ibrox. Armstrong and Mackay-Steven scored, as did Nadir Çiftçi. In April 2014, Robertson won the PFA Scotland Young Player of the Year award, and was named in the PFA Scotland Team of the Year for the 2013–14 Scottish Premiership. Robertson and United finished the season fourth best team in the league in Scotland.

His last appearance for United was in the 2014 Scottish Cup Final. With the score at 0–0, Ryan Dow's flicked volley hit the post from Robertson's first-time cross into the penalty area. St Johnstone won 2–0.

=== Hull City ===
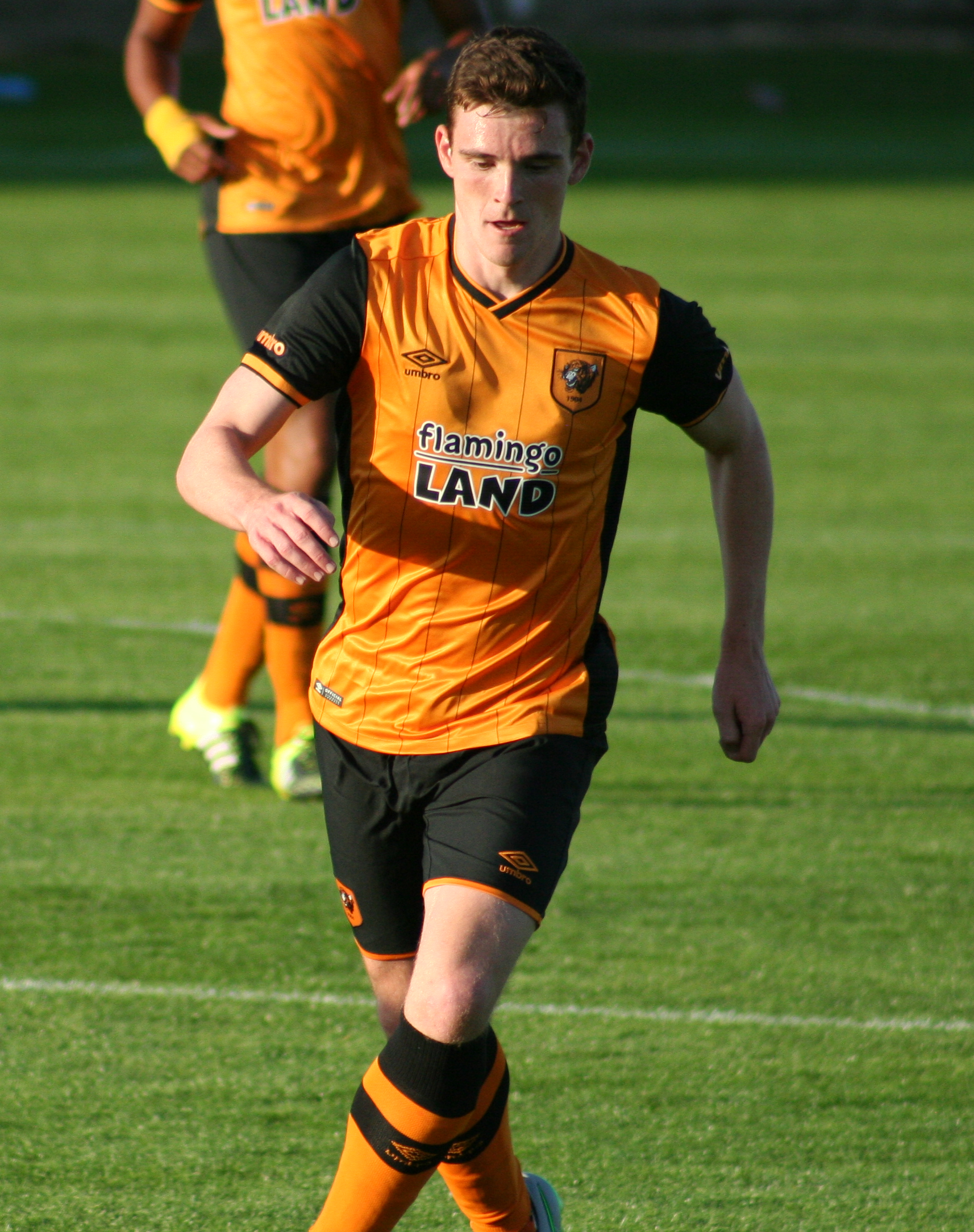
Robertson playing for Hull City in 2015

Aged 20, on 29 July 2014 Robertson signed a three-year contract with English Premier League club Hull City. The transfer fee was £2.85 million. Hull City's chief scout, Stan Ternent, explained, "I'd been looking at Stuart Armstrong but [Robertson] was the no brainer … he'd a history with Celtic and he was always a determined lad given how he'd recovered from his setbacks. You could see straight away he had ability and he can only get better."

Robertson made a goal-line clearance debuting on the opening day of the 2014–15 Premier League season. Hull won 1–0 at Queens Park Rangers. That August he was Hull's Player of the Month. He made 24 Hull appearances that season, all in the league. Hull finished 18th in the 20 team division that season, for relegation to the Championship. Hatem Ben Arfa predicted of his relegated Hull teammates, "There's one who can be super, super, super good … and that's Robertson."

Robertson scored the opener for his first Hull goal on 3 November 2015 at Brentford. That 2–0 win put Hull top of the Championship table. He started the 2016 Championship play-off final against Sheffield Wednesday. Hull won 1–0 for promotion to the Premier League. Robertson played in 52 Hull games in all competitions that season.

Hull spent one season back in the top flight before being relegated at the end of the 2016–17 season. Like two years before, they finished 18th in the 20 team division. He played in 39 Hull league and cup games that season.

Robertson and fellow Hull defender Harry Maguire were recommended by Everton scout Steve Walsh to transfer in a combined £20 million deal, but Everton rejected the proposal.

=== Liverpool ===
==== 2017–2019 ====
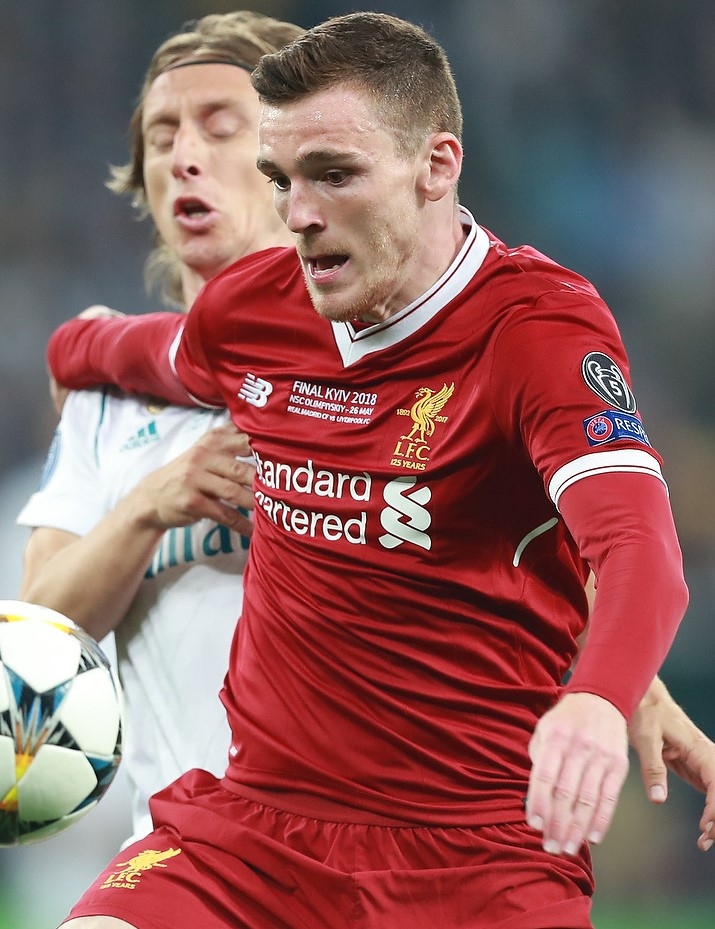
Robertson playing for Liverpool in the 2018 UEFA Champions League final

Aged 23, on 21 July 2017 Robertson signed a long-term contract with Liverpool under the management of Jürgen Klopp. The fee was an initial £8 million. Kevin Stewart went to Hull City at the same time for almost the same amount, in what has been described as a swap deal in all but name.

On 19 August, Robertson made his debut for Liverpool in a 1–0 league win over Crystal Palace. He was given the Man of the Match award.

Robertson started the 2017–18 season as Alberto Moreno's understudy. Moreno had a bright start to the season, meaning Robertson played only two further games before December. Moreno then injured his ankle, opening the first team opportunity for Robertson to grab on 2 December. Liverpool that day won 5–1 at home in the league against Brighton & Hove Albion, which was Robertson's Premier League debut.

Robertson's 70-yard pressing run late in his man of the match performance, in a 4–3 win against league leaders Manchester City, on 14 January 2018 went viral with Robertson elevated to cult hero among Liverpool fans. Robertson scored his first Liverpool goal in the last game of the 2017–18 season, an 4–0 home win against Brighton & Hove Albion.

He played the full 90 minutes of the 2018 UEFA Champions League final, 3–1 defeat to Real Madrid in Kyiv. The Independent wrote, "Robertson was one of Liverpool's more impressive players on the night, the highlight of his display being an expertly-timed last-ditch tackle to prevent Cristiano Ronaldo from scoring." Robertson ended the season with 30 appearances in all competitions, including 22 in the Premier League and 6 in the UEFA Champions League.

Robertson signed a new contract with the club in January 2019, due to run until 2024. In the 2018–19 Premier League season, Robertson registered 11 assists. Liverpool finished the league season as runners-up to Manchester City, to whom they suffered their only league defeat. Liverpool's 97 points was the then third-highest total in the history of the English top division. It was also the most points scored by a team without winning the title. Liverpool were unbeaten at home in the league for a consecutive season and matched the club record of 30 league wins in a season. On 25 April, Robertson was named in the 2018–19 PFA Team of the Year alongside Liverpool teammates Trent Alexander-Arnold, Sadio Mané and Virgil van Dijk; the following season, he was named in the team a second time.

On 7 May 2019, Robertson started in the 4–0 UEFA Champions League semi-final second-leg, home win against Barcelona. Described as "one of the most memorable comebacks of all time", that overturned the 1st leg 3–0 defeat. Robertson subbed off injured, 1–0 at half-time after being kicked by Luis Suárez.

On 1 June 2019, Robertson played the full 90 minutes of the UEFA Champions League final an 2–0 win against Tottenham Hotspur in Madrid, securing Liverpool's sixth European Cup title. He became the first Scotsman to win the final since Darren Fletcher (an unused substitute in 2008), and the first to play in the final winning team since Paul Lambert in 1997.

==== 2019–2021 ====
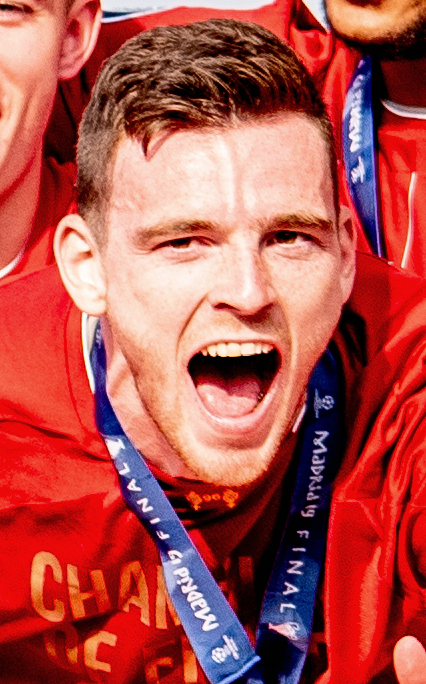
Robertson celebrating Liverpool's 2019 Champions League victory

Robertson started the 2019 UEFA Super Cup penalty shootout win against Chelsea in Istanbul. He was substituted in the 91st minute with the score at 1–1; the score ended 2–2 after extra-time.

In December, Robertson played in the 2019 FIFA Club World Cup 2–1 semi-final win over Monterrey. He then played the entirety of the final, a 1–0 extra-time win over Flamengo.

In Liverpool's first 2019–20 UEFA Champions League home game on 2 October, Robertson scored his first European goal against Red Bull Salzburg; Liverpool won 4–3. On 2 November 2019, Robertson scored his second Liverpool Premier League goal, equalising in the 87th minute against Aston Villa; Liverpool went on to win that game 1–2 in stoppage time. In the 2019–20 domestic campaign, Robertson contributed 2 goals and 12 assists for Liverpool.

In the 2020–21 season, the majority of games were played behind closed doors due to the COVID-19 pandemic. On 22 November 2020, Liverpool broke the club record for longest unbeaten run at home in the league (which had previously stood at 63) with a 3–0 win over Leicester City. That run ended on 21 January 2021 following a 1–0 defeat to Burnley; it had stood at 68, the second-longest unbeaten home run in English top-flight history, behind Chelsea's run of 86 games between March 2004 and October 2008, and the longest under a single manager. Robertson remained first choice left-back, starting 48 of the 50 games he played.

==== 2021–2023 ====
On 24 August 2021, Robertson signed a new long-term contract with Liverpool. He and Liverpool missed out on winning a historic quadruple that season. They defeated Chelsea in penalty shootouts in both the EFL Cup (11–10) and FA Cup (6–5) finals. Both finals were 0–0 after extra time. Robertson scored his team's eighth penalty in the 11–10 win. However, they finished second in the Premier League and were runners up in the UEFA Champions League, losing the final 1–0 in Paris to Real Madrid. He was selected as part of the UEFA Champions League Team of the Season.

At the start of the 2022–23 season, Robertson and Liverpool won the FA Community Shield. That piece of silverware meant that both manager Jürgen Klopp and Robertson had won all seven available first-tier trophies with Liverpool. On 26 December 2022 in a 1–3 win at Aston Villa, Robertson became the defender with most assists in Premier League history with 54; surpassing previous record Leighton Baines.

==== 2023–2026 ====
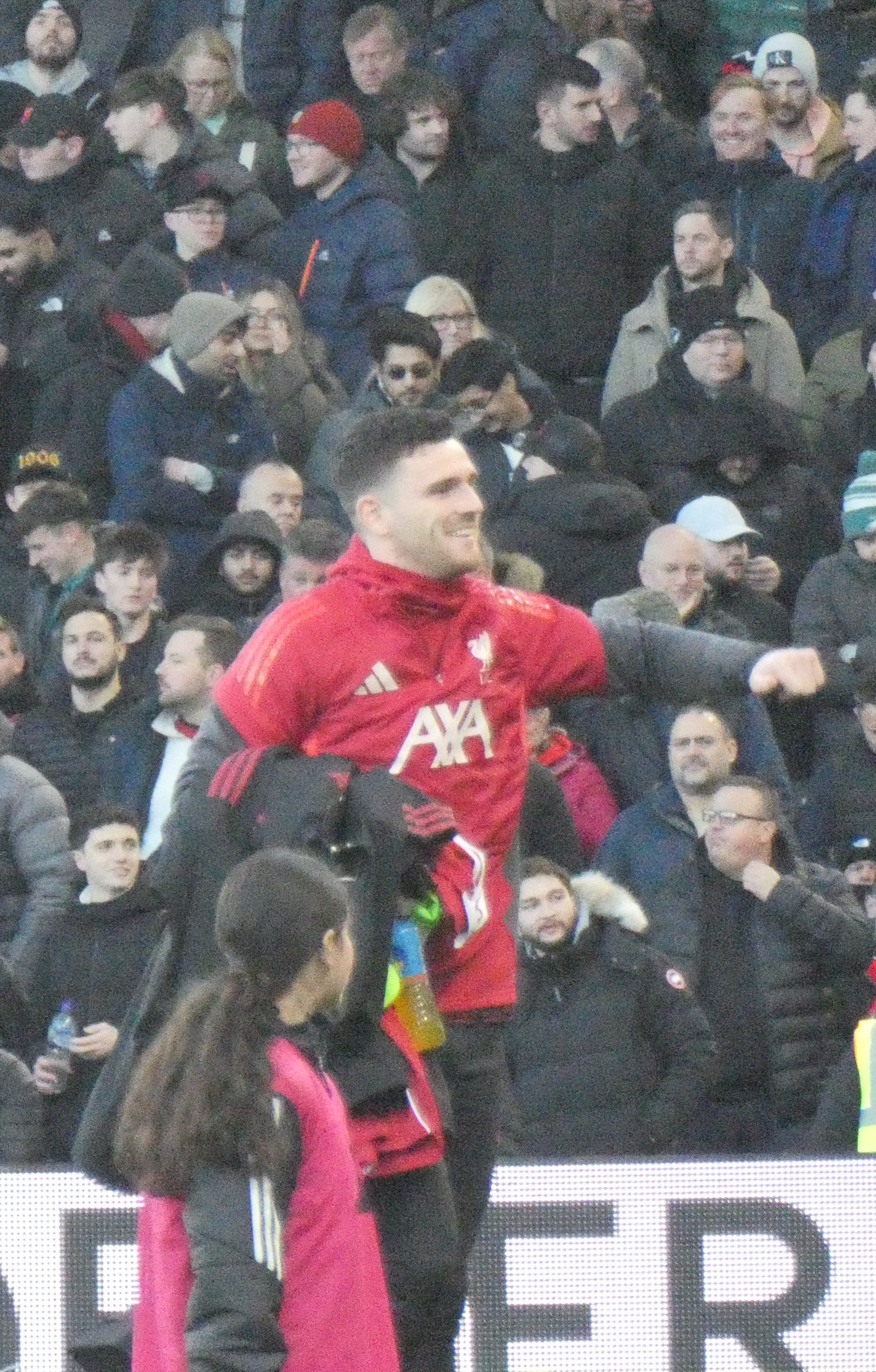
Robertson warming up for Liverpool in 2026

On 16 September 2023, with captain Virgil van Dijk suspended and vice-captain Trent Alexander-Arnold injured, Robertson was made captain for a 3–1 comeback win against Wolverhampton Wanderers. He marked his 200th Premier League appearance for Liverpool by scoring Liverpool's second goal in that game; his 9th Liverpool goal.

On 25 February 2024, Robertson and Liverpool defeated Chelsea 1–0 after extra-time, winning the 2024 EFL Cup final. Robertson managed only 30 appearances for Liverpool that season, as a shoulder injured while playing for Scotland against Spain in October 2023 sidelined him until January 2024.

On 1 September 2024, after a 3–0 win over rivals Manchester United, Robertson was among those to comment on the defensive solidarity under new manager Arne Slot, as opposed to high-risk gegenpressing under Jürgen Klopp. Robertson added, "We look a bit more secure defensively." Robertson added later in the season, "It was obviously a different style [back then], It was high energy and high press. This team is a bit more controlled. Two very different teams." An article from Fara Williams in May 2025 analysing the impact of Slot's style of play on Robertson included, "You think back to the Klopp teams in terms of how high up the pitch both Trent and Robertson used to play and how aggressive they were in terms of their start position. That has changed under Arne Slot." Williams added, "He (Slot) is more patient in how they build. They don't leave themselves too exposed to transitions. They are not as expansive through their full-backs. We talk about how well their midfield has played this year, a lot of play has gone through the midfield, whereas under Klopp, they went more down the outside. So there has been a lot of differences, a lot of changes in the system, and that affects personnel. You can even look at the amount of time Robertson and Alexander-Arnold have been on the pitch together and I don't think that has happened as much as before."

Slot explained in November 2024 that Robertson being rotated in selection was due to him missing pre-season training. Slot then praised Robertson, despite receiving a red card in the 17th minute in a 2–2 home draw with Fulham on 14 December. Robertson made 45 appearances that season as he won his second Premier League title.

On 29 August 2025, following the departure of Trent Alexander-Arnold to Real Madrid, 31-year-old Robertson became Liverpool's new vice-captain, acting as deputy to Virgil van Dijk. Despite that, he initially lost his starting spot in the first five games of the new season to new signing Milos Kerkez. Robertson was restored as first choice left-back and Kerkez was benched on 17 September 2025, for the 3–2 UEFA Champions League home win against Atlético Madrid. Robertson delivered a positively-received performance, also scoring the opener from a Mohamed Salah free-kick. After Kerkez was restored as the first-choice left-back, Robertson was linked with a transfer to Tottenham Hotspur during the January 2026 transfer window; however, the offer was reportedly rejected due to Liverpool's inability to recall Kostas Tsimikas from his own loan spell at Roma. On 9 April 2026, Robertson announced that he would leave Liverpool at the end of the season, following the expiry of his contract. He made his final appearance for Liverpool in an 1–1 draw with Brentford at Anfield on 24 May 2026.

=== Tottenham Hotspur ===
On 5 June 2026, fellow Premier League club Tottenham Hotspur announced the signing of Robertson as a free agent after nine years at Liverpool. He made his debut for the club on 22 August in a 3–0 away defeat to Brentford in the Premier League.

== International career ==
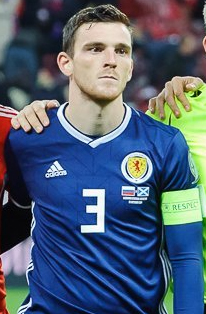
Robertson with Scotland in 2019

=== Under-21s ===
Robertson debuted internationally for the Scotland under-21s on 10 October 2013, subbing on in a 2–1 win in Paisley against Slovakia. He was selected for the under-21 team in November 2015, when the full national team did not have a fixture.

=== Senior squad ===
Robertson was first named in the full Scotland squad for a friendly against Poland on 5 March 2014. He played for Dundee United at the time. He subbed on in the second half, as Scotland won 1–0 in Warsaw. Scotland manager Gordon Strachan said afterwards "Andy came on there and the first time he picked it up he drove about 30 yards. I thought 'that's fantastic'. Absolutely no grey area, I'm going to do what I do. I loved seeing that first touch."

Robertson made his first start for the national team in a 2–2 draw at Craven Cottage with Nigeria on 28 May 2014. He scored his first international goal in November 2014, losing a friendly 3–1 to England at Celtic Park.

On 3 September 2018, Robertson was appointed Scotland captain by manager Alex McLeish. After a 2–1 defeat against Israel in October 2018, Robertson said that both he and fellow left-back Kieran Tierney were being played out of position in the 3–5–2 system adopted by McLeish to accommodate both players.

==== Steve Clarke era: 2019–2026 ====
After the sacking of Alex McLeish, Steve Clarke was appointed manager of Scotland in May 2019; he elected to keep Robertson as captain. In Clarke's first game as Scotland manager, a UEFA Euro 2020 qualifier against Cyprus on 8 June 2019, Robertson scored the opener with a long-range strike. Scotland went on to win 2–1. In October's qualifiers against San Marino and Russia, Robertson was reunited with former Queen's Park teammate Lawrence Shankland, the two having last played together for then-amateur Queen's Park in the Scottish Third Division in 2012. In November 2020, with Robertson again as captain, Scotland qualified for UEFA Euro 2020 following a play-off 5–4 win on penalties against Serbia in Belgrade. It was Scotland's first major tournament qualification since 1998, ending a 22-year non-qualifying streak.

On 14 June 2021, Robertson captained Scotland in their first Euro 2020 game, losing 2–0 to the Czech Republic. After a 0–0 draw with England at Wembley Stadium, Scotland were knocked out at the group stage after losing 3–1 to Croatia. On 4 September 2021, Robertson won his 50th cap and thereby joined the Scottish FA International Roll of Honour. In his next game, he led the team to a 0–1 away win against Austria. Akin to Robertson reuniting with Shankland two years prior, Paul McGinn made his debut against Austria; reuniting him and Robertson for the first time in almost nine years since appearing together with Queen's Park.

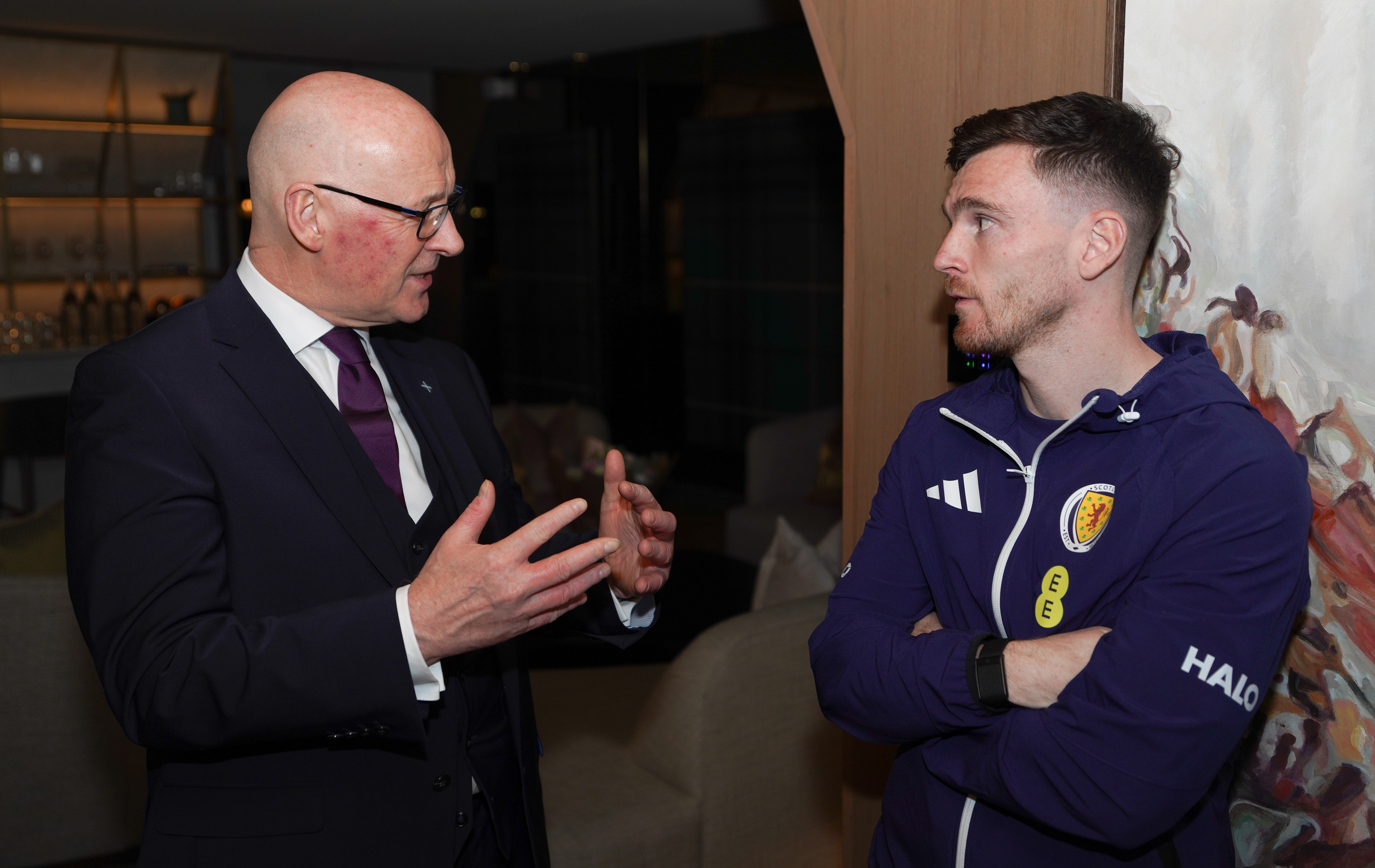
Robertson (right) with the First Minister of Scotland John Swinney, in 2026

Late goals from Lyndon Dykes and Kenny McLean earned Scotland a comeback 1–2 win against Norway in Oslo in June 2023. Robertson was named man of the match, and was described by BBC Sport's Thomas Duncan as having "led by example... composed at the back and brilliant at driving the team forward up the left, he barely put a foot wrong." This result put Scotland top of their UEFA Euro 2024 qualifying group on a maximum nine points from three games played; having beaten Cyprus and Spain in the two prior games. Scotland finished second in Group A behind the latter, automatically qualifying them for UEFA Euro 2024.

On 7 June 2024, Robertson was named in Scotland's squad for UEFA Euro 2024 in Germany. On the same day in a 2–2 friendly draw with Finland, he was Scotland captain for the 49th time; this surpassed George Young's record for the most games as captain of the Scotland men's national team.

On 14 June 2024, he started the opening match of Euro 2024. Scotland lost 5–1 to hosts Germany, with Ryan Porteous sent off before half-time. Robertson started in the 1–1 draw with Switzerland and the 1–0 defeat to Hungary. With Scotland needing to win, Robertson in defence was replaced after 88 minutes by Lewis Morgan in attack. Hungary then counter-attacked in the 10th minute of stoppage time up Robertson's side of the pitch to score. Scotland were thus eliminated, bottom of Group A with one point from three games. On 18 November 2024, Robertson scored a stoppage-time winner in a UEFA Nations League, 2–1 win in Poland, that prevented Scotland's automatic relegation to League B, after finishing third in their group. Scotland though were subsequently relegated in the relegation play-off, losing 3–1 on aggregate to Greece.

During Scotland's 2026 World Cup qualifying campaign, Robertson (in his seventh year as Scotland captain) provided two assists; in a 2–1 win vs Belarus and a 3–2 loss vs Greece. On 18 November 2025, Scotland faced Denmark at Hampden Park, with Scotland needing a win to automatically qualify for the tournament. On his 90th cap, Robertson led his country to a first World Cup since 1998 in a famous 4–2 victory. He won his 92nd cap in a 1–0 defeat against Ivory Coast on 31 March 2026, making him the second-highest capped player in the country's history.

On 19 May 2026, Robertson was selected in the 26-man squad for the 2026 FIFA World Cup. The first Scot to captain his country at a World Cup since Colin Hendry in 1998, he played the full 90 minutes in all three group stage matches as Scotland finished third in Group B and failed to progress.

==== Sébastien Pocognoli era: 2026– ====
He retained the captain's armband under new manager Sébastien Pocognoli, who said: "Andy is a great captain. From the first day, he has been important for me, as he was for the previous coach. He is really committed [to] creating a connection between the coaching staff and the players." Robertson won his 100th cap in a 2–0 victory over North Macedonia in the Nations League on 3 October 2026, putting in a man of the match performance and becoming only the second Scotsman, after Kenny Dalglish, to reach a century of caps.

On 13 November 2026, he played his 102nd game with Scotland in a 2–1 victory against North Macedonia in the 2026–27 UEFA Nations League and equalled Dalglish's record to become Scotland's joint most-capped player. Robertson broke the record three days later when he started in a 4–0 defeat to Switzerland in St. Gallen.

== Style of play ==
During his prime between 2018 and 2022, Robertson was frequently described by pundits and media sources as one of the best left-backs in world football. An online article specifically analysing Robertson's style (at the time under Klopp at Liverpool), highlighted defensively Robertson's, "discipline required to maintain the defensive integrity of the team", "ability to time his presses and regain possession," and "positional intelligence and awareness." The article added, "Robertson's defensive strategy involves proactive decision-making, calculated risks, and strategic positional play. This allows him to make crucial interceptions and regain possession for his team, [to] often launch counter-attacks." The same article described Robertson's attacking threat from his, "blistering pace", "exemplary assists", "work ethic", "dynamic overlapping runs" and "ability to exploit spaces and provide precise crosses helps his team create and convert chances".

Former Manchester United manager José Mourinho commented in December 2018, after losing 3–1 to Liverpool, "I am still tired, just look[ing] at Robertson. He makes, I think, 100-metre sprints every minute. Absolutely incredible, and these are qualities."

Robertson wrote in a 2019 self-penned article, "No magic wands have been waved in my direction, I didn't win some kind of lottery to land a spot on one of the biggest clubs in the world. The reason why I'm a Liverpool player is the same reason why I'm captain of my country: I've worked my bollocks off to get where I am, and by doing that, I've been able to make the most of whatever talent I have."

Fábio Aurélio, a predecessor Liverpool left-back, in June 2020 said of Robertson: "He's kind of the complete player because physically he's well capable of going forward and going back he defends very well." He added, "He's quick, so his one-v-one is good", and "he's always improving, he's not comfortable in his situation being first choice."

== Philanthropy ==
In March 2018 Robertson donated a Liverpool shirt signed by teammate Roberto Firmino to a young boy who had given his pocket money to a local food bank. The Sunday Times reported in March 2020 that Robertson had donated significant sums to food banks in the Glasgow area. In November 2020, Robertson founded the AR26 Charity, which aims to help socially deprived and critically ill children.

In September 2020, Robertson released his first memoir, Robbo: Now You're Gonna Believe Us, which mainly focuses on Liverpool's 2019–20 campaign. All proceeds from the book go to Robertson's foundation, which helps underprivileged children in Scotland.

== Personal life ==
Robertson married Rachel Roberts in the summer of 2022. The couple have three children, a son (born 2017) and two daughters (born 2019 and 2023). In 2019 he was living in Formby. He is a practising Roman Catholic.

Robertson was appointed a Member of the Order of the British Empire (MBE) in the 2023 New Year Honours for services to association football, charity and young people.

== Career statistics ==
=== Club ===
As of match played 21 November 2026

Appearances and goals by club, season and competition
Club	Season	League			National cup (Note: Includes Scottish Cup, FA Cup)		League cup (Note: Includes Scottish League Cup, Football League/EFL Cup)		Europe		Other		Total	
Club	Season	Division	Apps	Goals	Apps	Goals	Apps	Goals	Apps	Goals	Apps	Goals	Apps	Goals
Queen's Park	2012–13	Scottish Third Division	34	2	2	0	3	0	—		4 (Note: Two appearances in Scottish Challenge Cup, two appearances in Scottish Third Division play-offs)	0	43	2
Dundee United	2013–14	Scottish Premiership	36	3	5	2	3	0	—		—		44	5
Hull City	2014–15	Premier League	24	0	0	0	0	0	0	0	—		24	0
Hull City	2015–16	Championship	42	2	2	0	5	1	—		3 (Note: Appearances in Championship play-offs)	1	52	4
Hull City	2016–17	Premier League	33	1	2	0	4	0	—		—		39	1
Hull City	Total		99	3	4	0	9	1	0	0	3	1	115	5
Liverpool	2017–18	Premier League	22	1	1	0	1	0	6 (Note: Appearances in UEFA Champions League)	0	—		30	1
Liverpool	2018–19	Premier League	36	0	0	0	0	0	12	0	—		48	0
Liverpool	2019–20	Premier League	36	2	1	0	0	0	8	1	4 (Note: One appearance in FA Community Shield, one appearance in UEFA Super Cup, two appearances in FIFA Club World Cup)	0	49	3
Liverpool	2020–21	Premier League	38	1	1	0	0	0	10	0	1 (Note: Appearance in FA Community Shield)	0	50	1
Liverpool	2021–22	Premier League	29	3	4	0	4	0	10	0	—		47	3
Liverpool	2022–23	Premier League	34	0	2	0	1	0	5	0	1	0	43	0
Liverpool	2023–24	Premier League	23	3	2	0	1	0	4 (Note: Appearances in UEFA Europa League)	0	—		30	3
Liverpool	2024–25	Premier League	33	0	0	0	4	0	8	0	—		45	0
Liverpool	2025–26	Premier League	24	1	2	1	2	0	7	1	1	0	36	3
Liverpool	Total		275	11	13	1	13	0	70	2	7	0	378	14
Tottenham Hotspur	2026–27	Premier League	10	0	0	0	1	0	—		—		11	0
Career total			454	19	24	3	29	1	70	2	14	1	591	26

=== International ===
As of match played 16 November 2026

Appearances and goals by national team and year
National team	Year	Apps	Goals
Scotland	2014	5	1
Scotland	2015	3	0
Scotland	2016	4	0
Scotland	2017	8	1
Scotland	2018	8	0
Scotland	2019	6	1
Scotland	2020	6	0
Scotland	2021	15	0
Scotland	2022	5	0
Scotland	2023	7	0
Scotland	2024	13	1
Scotland	2025	10	0
Scotland	2026	13	0
Total		103	4

As of match played 16 November 2026
Scotland score listed first, score column indicates score after each Robertson goal

List of international goals scored by Andy Robertson
No.	Date	Venue	Cap	Opponent	Score	Result	Competition	Ref.
1	18 November 2014	Celtic Park, Glasgow, Scotland	5	England	1–2	1–3	Friendly	
2	1 September 2017	LFF Stadium, Vilnius, Lithuania	16	Lithuania	2–0	3–0	2018 FIFA World Cup qualification	
3	8 June 2019	Hampden Park, Glasgow, Scotland	30	Cyprus	1–0	2–1	UEFA Euro 2020 qualifying	
4	18 November 2024	Stadion Narodowy, Warsaw, Poland	80	Poland	2–1	2–1	2024–25 UEFA Nations League A	

== Honours ==
Hull City

- Football League Championship play-offs: 2016

Liverpool

- Premier League: 2019–20, 2024–25
- FA Cup: 2021–22
- EFL Cup: 2021–22, 2023–24; runner-up: 2024–25
- FA Community Shield: 2022
- UEFA Champions League: 2018–19; runner-up: 2017–18, 2021–22
- UEFA Super Cup: 2019
- FIFA Club World Cup: 2019

Individual

- PFA Scotland Young Player of the Year: 2013–14
- PFA Scotland Team of the Year: 2013–14
- SPFL Player of the Month: November 2013
- SPFL Young Player of the Month: September 2013
- PFA Team of the Year: 2018–19 Premier League, 2019–20 Premier League
- UEFA Champions League Breakthrough XI: 2018
- UEFA Champions League Squad of the Season: 2018–19
- UEFA Team of the Year: 2019
- UEFA Champions League Team of the Season: 2021–22
- ESM Team of the Year: 2019–20

Orders

- Member of the Order of the British Empire: 2022

== See also ==
- List of Scotland national football team captains
- List of men's footballers with 100 or more international caps
