= 2017–18 in Spanish football =

Football in Spain
- Season: 2017–18

Men's football
- La Liga: Barcelona
- Segunda División: Rayo Vallecano
- Segunda División B: Mallorca
- Copa del Rey: Barcelona
- Copa Federación: Pontevedra
- Supercopa: Real Madrid

Women's football
- Primera División: Atlético Madrid
- Copa de la Reina: Barcelona

The 2017–18 season was the 116th season of competitive association football in Spain.

== Promotion and relegation ==
=== Pre-season ===
League	Promoted to league	Relegated from league
La Liga	Getafe; Girona; Levante	Granada; Osasuna; Sporting Gijón
Segunda División	Albacete; Barcelona B; Cultural Leonesa; Lorca FC	Elche; Mallorca; Mirandés; UCAM Murcia
Segunda División B	Atlético Madrid B; Badajoz; Cerceda (Note: Boiro and Gavà, relegated due to unpaid debts to their players. Peralada and Cerceda bought their berths.); Deportivo Aragón; Deportivo La Coruña B; Écija; Formentera; Gimnástica Segoviana; Las Palmas Atlético; Lorca Deportiva; Olot; Ontinyent; Peña Deportiva (Note: As Mallorca B was relegated due to the relegation of Mallorca, Peña Deportiva gained its place.); Peña Sport; Peralada; Rápido de Bouzas; Real Betis B; Sporting Gijón B; Talavera de la Reina; Unión Adarve; Vitoria	Arandina; Atlético Levante; Atlético Mancha Real; Atlético Sanluqueño; Boiro; Eldense; Espanyol B; Gavà; Jaén; L'Hospitalet; La Roda; Linares; Mallorca B; Mensajero; Mutilvera; Palencia (Note: Palencia was relegated to Primera Regional due to unpaid debts to their players.); Prat; Sestao River; Socuéllamos; Somozas; Zamudio
Primera División (women)	Madrid CFF; Sevilla	Oiartzun; Tacuense

== National teams ==
=== Spain national football team ===
==== Results and fixtures ====
===== 2018 FIFA World Cup qualification (UEFA) Group G =====
Pos	Team	Pld	W	D	L	GF	GA	GD	Pts	Qualification	Spain	Italy	Albania	Israel	North Macedonia	Liechtenstein
1	Spain	10	9	1	0	36	3	+33	28	Qualification to 2018 FIFA World Cup	—	3–0	3–0	4–1	4–0	8–0
2	Italy	10	7	2	1	21	8	+13	23	Advance to second round	1–1	—	2–0	1–0	1–1	5–0
3	Albania	10	4	1	5	10	13	−3	13		0–2	0–1	—	0–3	2–1	2–0
4	Israel	10	4	0	6	10	15	−5	12		0–1	1–3	0–3	—	0–1	2–1
5	Macedonia	10	3	2	5	15	15	0	11		1–2	2–3	1–1	1–2	—	4–0
6	Liechtenstein	10	0	0	10	1	39	−38	0		0–8	0–4	0–2	0–1	0–3	—

Source: FIFA
Rules for classification: Qualification tiebreakers

2018 FIFA World Cup qualification tiebreakers
In league format, the ranking of teams in each group was based on the following criteria (regulations Articles 20.6 and 20.7):
1. Points (3 points for a win, 1 point for a draw, 0 points for a loss)
2. Overall goal difference
3. Overall goals scored
4. Points in matches between tied teams
5. Goal difference in matches between tied teams
6. Goals scored in matches between tied teams
7. Away goals scored in matches between tied teams (if the tie was only between two teams in home-and-away league format)
8. Fair play points
  - first yellow card: minus 1 point
  - indirect red card (second yellow card): minus 3 points
  - direct red card: minus 4 points
  - yellow card and direct red card: minus 5 points
9. Drawing of lots by the FIFA Organising Committee

=== Spain women's national football team ===
==== 2019 FIFA Women's World Cup qualification (UEFA) Group 7 ====
Pos	Team	Pld	W	D	L	GF	GA	GD	Pts	Qualification	Spain	Austria	Finland	Serbia	Israel
1	Spain	8	8	0	0	25	2	+23	24	2019 FIFA Women's World Cup	—	4–0	5–1	3–0	2–0
2	Austria	8	5	1	2	19	7	+12	16		0–1	—	4–1	1–1	2–0
3	Finland	8	3	1	4	9	13	−4	10		0–2	0–2	—	1–0	4–0
4	Serbia	8	2	1	5	5	13	−8	7		1–2	0–4	0–2	—	2–0
5	Israel	8	0	1	7	0	23	−23	1		0–6	0–6	0–0	0–1	—

Source: UEFA
Rules for classification: Qualification tiebreakers

== FIFA competitions ==
=== 2017 FIFA Club World Cup ===
==== Semifinals ====
13 December 2017
21:00

Al-Jazira (United Arab Emirates)	1–2	(Spain) Real Madrid
Romarinho 41'	Report	Ronaldo 53'; Bale 81'

Zayed Sports City Stadium, Abu Dhabi
Attendance: 36,650
Referee: Sandro Ricci (Brazil)

==== Final ====
16 December 2017
21:00

Real Madrid (Spain)	1–0	(Brazil) Grêmio
Ronaldo 53'	Report

Zayed Sports City Stadium, Abu Dhabi
Attendance: 41,094
Referee: César Ramos (Mexico)

== UEFA competitions ==
=== 2017–18 UEFA Champions League ===
==== Play-off round ====
Team 1	Agg.	Team 2	1st leg	2nd leg
İstanbul Başakşehir (Turkey)	3–4	(Spain) Sevilla	1–2	2–2

==== Group stage ====
===== Group C =====
Pos	Team	Pld	W	D	L	GF	GA	GD	Pts	Qualification	ROM	CHE	ATM	QRB
1	(Italy) Roma	6	3	2	1	9	6	+3	11 (Note: Head-to-head results: Chelsea 3–3 Roma, Roma 3–0 Chelsea.)	Advance to knockout phase	—	3–0	0–0	1–0
2	(England) Chelsea	6	3	2	1	16	8	+8	11	Advance to knockout phase	3–3	—	1–1	6–0
3	(Spain) Atlético Madrid	6	1	4	1	5	4	+1	7	Transfer to Europa League	2–0	1–2	—	1–1
4	(Azerbaijan) Qarabağ	6	0	2	4	2	14	−12	2		1–2	0–4	0–0	—

Source: UEFA

===== Group D =====
Pos	Team	Pld	W	D	L	GF	GA	GD	Pts	Qualification	BAR	JUV	SPO	OLY
1	(Spain) Barcelona	6	4	2	0	9	1	+8	14	Advance to knockout phase	—	3–0	2–0	3–1
2	(Italy) Juventus	6	3	2	1	7	5	+2	11	Advance to knockout phase	0–0	—	2–1	2–0
3	(Portugal) Sporting CP	6	2	1	3	8	9	−1	7	Transfer to Europa League	0–1	1–1	—	3–1
4	(Greece) Olympiacos	6	0	1	5	4	13	−9	1		0–0	0–2	2–3	—

Source: UEFA

===== Group E =====
Pos	Team	Pld	W	D	L	GF	GA	GD	Pts	Qualification	LIV	SEV	SPM	MRB
1	(England) Liverpool	6	3	3	0	23	6	+17	12	Advance to knockout phase	—	2–2	7–0	3–0
2	(Spain) Sevilla	6	2	3	1	12	12	0	9	Advance to knockout phase	3–3	—	2–1	3–0
3	(Russia) Spartak Moscow	6	1	3	2	9	13	−4	6	Transfer to Europa League	1–1	5–1	—	1–1
4	(Slovenia) Maribor	6	0	3	3	3	16	−13	3		0–7	1–1	1–1	—

Source: UEFA

===== Group H =====
Pos	Team	Pld	W	D	L	GF	GA	GD	Pts	Qualification	TOT	RMA	DOR	APO
1	(England) Tottenham Hotspur	6	5	1	0	15	4	+11	16	Advance to knockout phase	—	3–1	3–1	3–0
2	(Spain) Real Madrid	6	4	1	1	17	7	+10	13	Advance to knockout phase	1–1	—	3–2	3–0
3	(Germany) Borussia Dortmund	6	0	2	4	7	13	−6	2 (Note: Head-to-head results: APOEL 1–1 Borussia Dortmund, Borussia Dortmund 1–1 APOEL (tied on head-to-head results, ranked on total goal difference).)	Transfer to Europa League	1–2	1–3	—	1–1
4	(Cyprus) APOEL	6	0	2	4	2	17	−15	2		0–3	0–6	1–1	—

Source: UEFA

==== Knockout phase ====
===== Round of 16 =====
Team 1	Agg.	Team 2	1st leg	2nd leg
Sevilla (Spain)	2–1	(England) Manchester United	0–0	2–1
Real Madrid (Spain)	5–2	(France) Paris Saint-Germain	3–1	2–1
Chelsea (England)	1–4	(Spain) Barcelona	1–1	0–3

===== Quarter-finals =====
Team 1	Agg.	Team 2	1st leg	2nd leg
Barcelona (Spain)	4–4 (a)	(Italy) Roma	4–1	0–3
Sevilla (Spain)	1–2	(Germany) Bayern Munich	1–2	0–0
Juventus (Italy)	3–4	(Spain) Real Madrid	0–3	3–1

===== Semi-finals =====
Team 1	Agg.	Team 2	1st leg	2nd leg
Bayern Munich (Germany)	3–4	(Spain) Real Madrid	1–2	2–2

===== Final =====
The final will be played at the NSC Olimpiyskiy Stadium in Kyiv on 26 May 2018. The "home" team (for administrative purposes) was determined by an additional draw held after the semi-final draw.

26 May 2018
21:45 UTC+3

Real Madrid (Spain)	3–1	(England) Liverpool
Benzema 51'; Bale 63', 83'	Report	Mané 55'

NSC Olimpiyskiy, Kyiv
Attendance: 61,561
Referee: Milorad Mažić (Serbia)

=== 2017–18 UEFA Europa League ===
==== Third qualifying round ====
Team 1	Agg.	Team 2	1st leg	2nd leg
Dinamo București (Romania)	1–4	(Spain) Athletic Bilbao	1–1	0–3

==== Play-off round ====
Team 1	Agg.	Team 2	1st leg	2nd leg
Panathinaikos (Greece)	2–4	(Spain) Athletic Bilbao	2–3	0–1

==== Group stage ====
===== Group A =====
Pos	Team	Pld	W	D	L	GF	GA	GD	Pts	Qualification	VIL	AST	SLP	MTA
1	(Spain) Villarreal	6	3	2	1	10	6	+4	11	Advance to knockout phase	—	3–1	2–2	0–1
2	(Kazakhstan) Astana	6	3	1	2	10	7	+3	10	Advance to knockout phase	2–3	—	1–1	4–0
3	(Czech Republic) Slavia Prague	6	2	2	2	6	6	0	8		0–2	0–1	—	1–0
4	(Israel) Maccabi Tel Aviv	6	1	1	4	1	8	−7	4		0–0	0–1	0–2	—

Source: UEFA

===== Group J =====
Pos	Team	Pld	W	D	L	GF	GA	GD	Pts	Qualification	ATH	OST	ZOR	HRT
1	(Spain) Athletic Bilbao	6	3	2	1	8	5	+3	11 (Note: Head-to-head results: Östersund 2–2 Athletic Bilbao, Athletic Bilbao 1–0 Östersund.)	Advance to knockout phase	—	1–0	0–1	3–2
2	(Sweden) Östersunds FK	6	3	2	1	8	4	+4	11	Advance to knockout phase	2–2	—	2–0	1–0
3	(Ukraine) Zorya Luhansk	6	2	0	4	3	9	−6	6		0–2	0–2	—	2–1
4	(Germany) Hertha BSC	6	1	2	3	6	7	−1	5		0–0	1–1	2–0	—

Source: UEFA

===== Group L =====
Pos	Team	Pld	W	D	L	GF	GA	GD	Pts	Qualification	ZEN	RS	ROS	VRD
1	(Russia) Zenit Saint Petersburg	6	5	1	0	17	5	+12	16	Advance to knockout phase	—	3–1	3–1	2–1
2	(Spain) Real Sociedad	6	4	0	2	16	6	+10	12	Advance to knockout phase	1–3	—	4–0	3–0
3	(Norway) Rosenborg	6	1	2	3	6	11	−5	5		1–1	0–1	—	3–1
4	(North Macedonia) Vardar	6	0	1	5	3	20	−17	1		0–5	0–6	1–1	—

Source: UEFA

==== Knockout phase ====
===== Round of 32 =====
Team 1	Agg.	Team 2	1st leg	2nd leg
Copenhagen (Denmark)	1–5	(Spain) Atlético Madrid	1-4	0–1
Spartak Moscow (Russia)	3–4	(Spain) Athletic Bilbao	1–3	2–1
Lyon (France)	4–1	(Spain) Villarreal	3–1	1–0
Real Sociedad (Spain)	3–4	(Austria) Red Bull Salzburg	2–2	1–2

===== Round of 16 =====
Team 1	Agg.	Team 2	1st leg	2nd leg
Atlético Madrid (Spain)	8–1	(Russia) Lokomotiv Moscow	3–0	5–1
Marseille (France)	5–2	(Spain) Athletic Bilbao	3–1	2–1

===== Quarter-finals =====
Team 1	Agg.	Team 2	1st leg	2nd leg
Atlético Madrid (Spain)	2–1	(Portugal) Sporting CP	2–0	0–1

===== Semi-finals =====
Team 1	Agg.	Team 2	1st leg	2nd leg
Arsenal (England)	1–2	(Spain) Atlético Madrid	1–1	0–1

===== Final =====
The final will be played at the Parc Olympique Lyonnais in Décines-Charpieu on 16 May 2018. The "home" team (for administrative purposes) was determined by an additional draw held after the semi-final draw.

16 May 2018
20:45 UTC+2

Marseille (France)	0–3	(Spain) Atlético Madrid
	Report	Griezmann 21', 49'; Gabi 89'

Parc Olympique Lyonnais, Décines-Charpieu
Attendance: 55,768
Referee: Björn Kuipers (Netherlands)

=== 2017–18 UEFA Youth League ===
==== Finals ====
The final was played on 23 April 2018 at Colovray Stadium, Nyon.

23 April 2018
17:00 UTC+2

Chelsea (England)	0–3	(Spain) Barcelona
	Report	Marqués 33', 52'; Ruiz 90+2'

Colovray Stadium, Nyon
Attendance: 7,200
Referee: Andreas Ekberg (Sweden)

=== 2017 UEFA Super Cup ===
8 August 2017
20:45 UTC+2

Real Madrid (Spain)	2–1	(England) Manchester United
Casemiro 24'; Isco 52'	Report	Lukaku 62'

Philip II Arena, Skopje
Attendance: 30,421
Referee: Gianluca Rocchi (Italy)

=== 2017–18 UEFA Women's Champions League ===
==== Knockout phase ====
===== Round of 32 =====
Team 1	Agg.	Team 2	1st leg	2nd leg
Atlético Madrid (Spain)	2–15	(Germany) Wolfsburg	0–3	2–12
Avaldsnes (Norway)	0–6	(Spain) Barcelona	0–4	0–2

===== Round of 16 =====
Team 1	Agg.	Team 2	1st leg	2nd leg
Gintra Universitetas (Lithuania)	0–9	(Spain) Barcelona	0–6	0–3

===== Quarter-finals =====
Team 1	Agg.	Team 2	1st leg	2nd leg
Lyon (France)	3–1	(Spain) Barcelona	2–1	1–0

== Men's football ==
=== League season ===
==== La Liga ====
Pos	Team	Pld	W	D	L	GF	GA	GD	Pts	Qualification or relegation
1	Barcelona (C)	38	28	9	1	99	29	+70	93	Qualification for the Champions League group stage
2	Atlético Madrid	38	23	10	5	58	22	+36	79	Qualification for the Champions League group stage
3	Real Madrid	38	22	10	6	94	44	+50	76	Qualification for the Champions League group stage
4	Valencia	38	22	7	9	65	38	+27	73	Qualification for the Champions League group stage
5	Villarreal	38	18	7	13	57	50	+7	61	Qualification for the Europa League group stage (Note: Since the winners of the 2017–18 Copa del Rey, Barcelona, qualified for European competition based on league position, the spot awarded to the cup winners (Europa League group stage) was passed to the sixth-placed team and the spot awarded to the sixth-placed team (Europa League second qualifying round) was passed to the seventh-placed team.)
6	Real Betis	38	18	6	14	60	61	−1	60	Qualification for the Europa League group stage
7	Sevilla	38	17	7	14	49	58	−9	58	Qualification for the Europa League second qualifying round
8	Getafe	38	15	10	13	42	33	+9	55	
9	Eibar	38	14	9	15	44	50	−6	51 (Note: Eibar finished ahead of Girona on head-to-head points: Eibar 4–1 Girona, Girona 1–4 Eibar.)	
10	Girona	38	14	9	15	50	59	−9	51	
11	Espanyol	38	12	13	13	36	42	−6	49 (Note: Head-to-head points: Espanyol 8, Real Sociedad 4, Celta Vigo 4 (Espanyol 2–1 Real Sociedad, Real Sociedad 1–1 Espanyol, Espanyol 2–1 Celta Vigo, Celta Vigo 2–2 Espanyol, Real Sociedad 1–2 Celta Vigo, Celta Vigo 2–3 Real Sociedad).)	
12	Real Sociedad	38	14	7	17	66	59	+7	49	
13	Celta Vigo	38	13	10	15	59	60	−1	49	
14	Alavés	38	15	2	21	40	50	−10	47	
15	Levante	38	11	13	14	44	58	−14	46	
16	Athletic Bilbao	38	10	13	15	41	49	−8	43 (Note: Athletic Bilbao finished ahead of Leganés on head-to-head goal difference: Athletic Bilbao 2–0 Leganés, Leganés 1–0 Athletic Bilbao.)	
17	Leganés	38	12	7	19	34	51	−17	43	
18	Deportivo La Coruña (R)	38	6	11	21	38	76	−38	29	Relegation to Segunda División
19	Las Palmas (R)	38	5	7	26	24	74	−50	22	Relegation to Segunda División
20	Málaga (R)	38	5	5	28	24	61	−37	20	Relegation to Segunda División

Source: La Liga, Soccerway
Rules for classification: 1) Points; 2) Head-to-head points; 3) Head-to-head goal difference; 4) Goal difference; 5) Goals scored; 6) Fair-play points (Note: Head-to-head record is used only after all the matches between the teams in question have been played)
(C) Champions; (R) Relegated

==== Segunda División ====
Pos	Team	Pld	W	D	L	GF	GA	GD	Pts	Promotion, qualification or relegation
1	Rayo Vallecano (C, P)	42	21	13	8	67	48	+19	76	Promotion to La Liga
2	Huesca (P)	42	21	12	9	61	40	+21	75	Promotion to La Liga
3	Zaragoza	42	20	11	11	57	44	+13	71 (Note: Zaragoza finished ahead of Sporting Gijón on head-to-head points: Sporting Gijón 0–1 Zaragoza, Zaragoza 2–1 Sporting Gijón)	Qualification for promotion play-offs
4	Sporting Gijón	42	21	8	13	60	40	+20	71	Qualification for promotion play-offs
5	Valladolid (O, P)	42	19	10	13	69	55	+14	67	Qualification for promotion play-offs
6	Numancia	42	18	11	13	52	41	+11	65 (Note: Numancia finished ahead of Oviedo on head-to-head goal difference: Oviedo 3–1 Numancia, Numancia 3–0 Oviedo)	Qualification for promotion play-offs
7	Oviedo	42	18	11	13	54	48	+6	65	
8	Osasuna	42	16	16	10	44	34	+10	64 (Note: Osasuna finished ahead of Cádiz on head-to-head points: Cádiz 0–2 Osasuna, Osasuna 1–0 Cádiz)	
9	Cádiz	42	16	16	10	42	29	+13	64	
10	Granada	42	17	10	15	55	50	+5	61	
11	Tenerife	42	15	14	13	58	50	+8	59	
12	Lugo	42	15	10	17	39	48	−9	55	
13	Alcorcón	42	12	16	14	37	42	−5	52 (Note: Alcorcón finished ahead of Reus and Gimnàstic on head-to-head points: Alcorcón 10 pts, Reus 5 pts, Gimnàstic 1 pt)	
14	Reus	42	12	16	14	31	42	−11	52	
15	Gimnàstic	42	15	7	20	44	50	−6	52	
16	Córdoba	42	15	6	21	57	65	−8	51	
17	Albacete	42	11	16	15	35	46	−11	49	
18	Almería	42	12	12	18	38	45	−7	48 (Note: Almería finished ahead of Cultural Leonesa on head-to head points: Cultural Leonesa 0–0 Almería, Almería 2–1 Cultural Leonesa)	
19	Cultural Leonesa (R)	42	11	15	16	54	67	−13	48	Relegation to Segunda División B
20	Barcelona B (R)	42	10	14	18	46	54	−8	44	Relegation to Segunda División B
21	Lorca FC (Note: Lorca were demoted to the Tercera División due to financial difficulties.) (R)	42	8	9	25	37	68	−31	33	Demotion to Tercera División
22	Sevilla Atlético (R)	42	7	11	24	29	60	−31	32	Relegation to Segunda División B

Source: La Liga
Rules for classification: 1) points; 2) head-to-head points; 3) head-to-head goal difference; 4) goal difference; 5) number of goals scored
(C) Champions; (O) Play-off winners; (P) Promoted; (R) Relegated

===== Promotion play-offs =====
Semi-finals
Numancia	1	2	3
Zaragoza	1	1	2
Valladolid	3	2	5
Sporting Gijón	1	1	2

Final
Numancia	0	1	1
Valladolid	3	1	4

==== Segunda División B ====
Group 1
Pos	Team	Pld	Pts
1	Rayo Majadahonda (O, P)	38	70
2	Deportivo Fabril	38	69
3	Fuenlabrada	38	65
4	Celta Vigo B	38	63
5	Rápido de Bouzas	38	61
6	Navalcarnero	38	61
7	Talavera de la Reina	38	56
8	Real Madrid Castilla	38	55
9	San Sebastián de los Reyes	38	51
10	Atlético Madrid B	38	51
11	Unión Adarve	38	51
12	Ponferradina	38	48
13	Guijuelo	38	45
14	Pontevedra	38	45
15	Valladolid B	38	44
16	Coruxo (O)	38	43
17	Toledo (R)	38	41
18	Racing Ferrol (R)	38	40
19	Gimnástica Segoviana (R)	38	39
20	Cerceda (R)	38	25

Source: BDFútbol
(O) Play-off winners;
(P) Promoted;
(R) Relegated

Group 2
Pos	Team	Pld	Pts
1	Mirandés	38	76
2	Sporting Gijón B	38	75
3	Real Sociedad B	38	74
4	Bilbao Athletic	38	73
5	Racing Santander	38	68
6	Barakaldo	38	63
7	UD Logroñés	38	61
8	Gernika	38	59
9	Tudelano	38	53
10	Leioa	38	51
11	Burgos	38	51
12	Arenas	38	46
13	Real Unión	38	46
14	Amorebieta	38	44
15	Vitoria	38	43
16	Izarra (O)	38	39
17	Peña Sport (R)	38	35
18	Lealtad (R)	38	28
19	Osasuna B (R)	38	24
20	Caudal (R)	38	19

Source: BDFútbol
(O) Play-off winners;
(R) Relegated

Group 3
Pos	Team	Pld	Pts
1	Mallorca (C, O, P)	38	73
2	Villarreal B	38	65
3	Elche (O, P)	38	63
4	Cornellà	38	60
5	Ontinyent	38	56
6	Ebro	38	56
7	Lleida Esportiu	38	55
8	Badalona	38	55
9	Peralada	38	52
10	Hércules	38	51
11	Valencia Mestalla	38	50
12	Sabadell	38	49
13	Alcoyano	38	49
14	Atlético Baleares	38	44
15	Olot	38	43
16	Llagostera (R)	38	42
17	Formentera (R)	38	41
18	Atlético Saguntino (R)	38	40
19	Peña Deportiva (R)	38	36
20	Deportivo Aragón (R)	38	20

Source: BDFútbol
(C) Champions;
(O) Play-off winners;
(P) Promoted;
(R) Relegated

Group 4
Pos	Team	Pld	Pts
1	Cartagena	38	71
2	Marbella	38	70
3	Murcia	38	65
4	Extremadura (O, P)	38	60
5	Melilla	38	60
6	Villanovense	38	54
7	UCAM Murcia	38	52
8	Granada B	38	51
9	San Fernando	38	49
10	El Ejido	38	49
11	Linense	38	48
12	Badajoz	38	48
13	Jumilla	38	47
14	Las Palmas Atlético	38	47
15	Recreativo	38	47
16	Mérida (R)	38	46
17	Écija (R)	38	45
18	Córdoba B (R)	38	43
19	Betis Deportivo (R)	38	40
20	Lorca Deportiva (R)	38	32

Source: BDFútbol
(O) Play-off winners;
(P) Promoted;
(R) Relegated

===== Group champions' play-offs =====
Semifinals
Mallorca	3	0	3
Mirandés	1	0	1
Cartagena	2	0	2
Rayo Majadahonda (a)	1	1	2

Finals
Mallorca	2	1	3
Rayo Majadahonda	1	0	1

Promoted to Segunda División
Elche (One year later)	Extremadura (First time ever)	Mallorca (One year later)	Rayo Majadahonda (First time ever)

=== Cup competitions ===
==== Copa del Rey ====
===== Final =====
21 April 2018
21:30 CEST

Sevilla	0–5	Barcelona
	Report	L. Suárez 14', 40'; Messi 31'; Iniesta 52'; Coutinho 69' (pen.)

Metropolitano Stadium, Madrid
Attendance: 62,623
Referee: Jesús Gil Manzano

==== Supercopa de España ====
===== First leg =====
13 August 2017
22:00

Barcelona	1–3	Real Madrid
Messi 77' (pen.)	Report	Piqué 50' (o.g.); Ronaldo 80'; Asensio 90'

Camp Nou, Barcelona
Attendance: 89,514
Referee: Ricardo de Burgos Bengoetxea

===== Second leg =====
16 August 2017
23:00

Real Madrid	2–0	Barcelona
Asensio 4'; Benzema 39'	Report

Santiago Bernabéu, Madrid
Attendance: 75,167
Referee: José María Sánchez Martínez

Real Madrid won the Supercopa de España 5–1 on aggregate

==== Copa Federación de España ====
Team 1	Agg.	Team 2	1st leg	2nd leg
Ontinyent (3) (Valencian Community)	0–1	(Galicia (Spain)) Pontevedra (3)	0–1	0–0

== Women's football ==
=== League season ===
==== Primera División ====
Pos	Team	Pld	W	D	L	GF	GA	GD	Pts	Qualification or relegation
1	Atlético de Madrid (C)	30	24	5	1	74	21	+53	77	Qualification for the UEFA Champions League and Copa de la Reina
2	Barcelona	30	24	4	2	98	12	+86	76	Qualification for the UEFA Champions League and Copa de la Reina
3	Athletic Club	30	18	2	10	51	41	+10	56	Qualification for the Copa de la Reina
4	Granadilla	30	16	6	8	48	33	+15	54	Qualification for the Copa de la Reina
5	Valencia	30	14	8	8	49	32	+17	50	Qualification for the Copa de la Reina
6	Betis	30	14	4	12	40	37	+3	46	Qualification for the Copa de la Reina
7	Real Sociedad	30	10	8	12	42	37	+5	38 (Note: Levante 1–1 1–2 Real Sociedad; Sporting de Huelva 0–1 1–2 Levante)	Qualification for the Copa de la Reina
8	Levante	30	11	5	14	49	50	−1	38	Qualification for the Copa de la Reina
9	Sporting de Huelva	30	11	5	14	35	42	−7	38	
10	Madrid CFF	30	10	6	14	34	56	−22	36	
11	Rayo Vallecano	30	9	6	15	39	63	−24	33	
12	Sevilla	30	8	7	15	35	50	−15	31	
13	Fundación Albacete	30	8	6	16	42	58	−16	30	
14	Espanyol	30	7	8	15	22	42	−20	29	
15	Zaragoza CFF (R)	30	6	5	19	31	67	−36	23	Relegation to the Segunda División
16	Santa Teresa (R)	30	4	7	19	20	68	−48	19	Relegation to the Segunda División

Source: La Liga, Soccerway
Rules for classification: 1) points; 2) head-to-head points; 3) goal difference; 4) number of goals scored
(C) Champions; (R) Relegated

==== Segunda División ====
===== Group of four teams for promotion =====
Semi-finals
13–20 May 2018
Logroño	2	0	2
Oviedo	0	1	1
13–20 May 2018
Seagull	0	1	1
Tacón	4	2	6

Final
27 May–3 June 2018
Logroño	1	2	3
Tacón	1	1	2

===== Group of three teams for promotion =====
Pos	Team	Pld	W	D	L	GF	GA	GD	Pts	Promotion	MGA	FEM	SPA
1	Málaga (P)	4	4	0	0	6	1	+5	12	Promotion to Primera División	—	1–0	2–1
2	Femarguín	4	1	0	3	7	6	+1	3		0–1	—	5–1
3	Sporting Plaza de Argel	4	1	0	3	5	11	−6	3		0–2	3–2	—

Rules for classification: 1) points; 2) goal difference; 3) number of goals scored.
(P) Promoted

=== Cup competitions ===
==== Copa de la Reina ====
2 June 2018
20:30

Barcelona	1–0	Atlético Madrid
Caldentey 120+2'

Estadio Romano, Mérida
Attendance: 13,600
Referee: Marta Huerta
