= 2018 UEFA Champions League final =

Football match in Kyiv, Ukraine

- Match programme cover
- Event: 2017–18 UEFA Champions League
Real Madrid	Liverpool
(Spain)	(England)
3	1
- Date: 26 May 2018
- Venue: NSC Olimpiyskiy, Kyiv
- Man of the Match: Gareth Bale (Real Madrid)
- Referee: Milorad Mažić (Serbia)
- Attendance: 61,561
- Weather: Sunny; 20 °C (68 °F); 37% humidity

The 2018 UEFA Champions League final was the final match of the 2017–18 UEFA Champions League, the 63rd season of Europe's premier club football tournament organised by UEFA, and the 26th season since it was renamed from the European Cup to the UEFA Champions League. It was played at the NSC Olimpiyskiy in Kyiv, Ukraine on 26 May 2018, between Spanish side and defending champions Real Madrid, who had won the competition in each of the previous two seasons, and English side Liverpool, making their eighth final appearance and first since 2007. The two sides had previously met in the 1981 final.

After Liverpool's Sadio Mané cancelled out Karim Benzema's opener for Real Madrid, two goals from man of the match Gareth Bale proved the difference in a 3–1 win for the Spaniards, making them the first team to win three back-to-back titles in the Champions League era and the first since Bayern Munich defeated Saint-Étienne in the 1976 European Cup final; it was additionally their fourth title in five seasons and their 13th European Cup overall. They also earned the right to play the winners of the 2017–18 UEFA Europa League, Atlético Madrid, in the 2018 UEFA Super Cup and to enter the semi-finals of the 2018 FIFA Club World Cup, losing the former and winning the latter. Additionally, Real Madrid qualified to enter the group stage of the 2018–19 UEFA Champions League, but since they already qualified through their league performance, the berth reserved was given to the champions of the 2017–18 Czech First League, the 11th-ranked association according to next season's access list.

== Venue ==
The NSC Olimpiyskiy in Kyiv hosted the final

The NSC Olimpiyskiy was announced as the final venue on 15 September 2016, following the decision of the UEFA Executive Committee meeting in Athens, Greece. This was the sixth European Cup/Champions League final hosted at an Eastern European venue following those in 1973 in Belgrade, Yugoslavia, the 1983, 1994 and 2007 finals hosted by Athens, Greece, as well as the 2008 final in Moscow, Russia.

The Olimpiyskiy Stadium was built in 1923 and it has been renovated three times, most recently in 2011 in preparation for the UEFA Euro 2012 tournament. The stadium was used as a venue in the 1980 Summer Olympics for its football event and the aforementioned European Championship, including the final match, which saw Spain beat Italy by the record-breaking score of 4–0 on the way to their third title. Its current capacity is 70,050 and it is used by the Ukraine national football team, Dynamo Kyiv, and major domestic matches like the Ukrainian Cup.

== Background ==
Defending champions Real Madrid reached a record 16th final after a 4–3 aggregate win against German side Bayern Munich, knocking them out of the competition for the second consecutive season. This was Real Madrid's third consecutive final, and fourth final in five tournaments with an opportunity to win a record 13th title. Previously they won finals in 1956, 1957, 1958, 1959, 1960, 1966, 1998, 2000, 2002, 2014, 2016 and 2017; and lost in 1962, 1964 and 1981. This was also their 20th final in all seasonal UEFA competitions, having also played in two Cup Winners' Cup finals (losing in 1971 and 1983) and two UEFA Cup finals (winning in 1985 and 1986). Real Madrid are only the third team since the competition's rebranding as the Champions League to reach three consecutive finals after Milan in 1995 and Juventus in 1998. They were the first team in the Champions League era, and the fourth overall, to win three straight finals, a feat only achieved by the Real Madrid side of the 1950s, as they went on to win a record five successive finals, as well as the Ajax and Bayern Munich squads of the 1970s in 1973 and 1976, respectively.

Liverpool reached their eighth final, their first since 2007, after a 7–6 aggregate win against Italian side Roma. They had won the final on five occasions (1977, 1978, 1981, 1984 and 2005), and lost twice (1985 and 2007). This was also their 13th final in UEFA seasonal competitions, having played in one Cup Winners' Cup final (losing in 1966) and four UEFA Cup/Europa League finals (winning in 1973, 1976 and 2001; and losing in 2016). Liverpool were the first team since Bayern Munich in 2011–12 to reach the final having qualified for the competition through the play-off round. This was also the most recent occasion the final featured an English team (Chelsea). Liverpool were the most recent team to defeat Real Madrid in a European Cup final, winning 1–0 in Paris in 1981.

Besides the 1981 final, the two teams had played each other four times in the Champions League era. Liverpool won both matches in the 2008–09 UEFA Champions League round of 16 (1–0 away and 4–0 at home), while Real Madrid won both matches in the 2014–15 UEFA Champions League group stage (3–0 away and 1–0 at home).

=== Previous finals ===
In the following table, finals until 1992 were in the European Cup era, since 1993 were in the UEFA Champions League era.

Team	Previous finals appearances (bold indicates winners)
(Spain) Real Madrid	15 (**1956**, **1957**, **1958**, **1959**, **1960**, 1962, 1964, **1966**, 1981, **1998**, **2000**, **2002**, **2014**, **2016**, **2017**)
(England) Liverpool	7 (**1977**, **1978**, **1981**, **1984**, 1985, **2005**, 2007)

== Route to the final ==
Note: In all results below, the score of the finalist is given first (H: home; A: away).

(Spain) Real Madrid				Round	(England) Liverpool			
Bye				Qualifying phase	Opponent	Agg.	1st leg	2nd leg
Bye				Play-off round	(Germany) TSG Hoffenheim	6–3	2–1 (A)	4–2 (H)
Opponent	Result			Group stage	Opponent	Result		
(Cyprus) APOEL	3–0 (H)			Matchday 1	(Spain) Sevilla	2–2 (H)		
(Germany) Borussia Dortmund	3–1 (A)			Matchday 2	(Russia) Spartak Moscow	1–1 (A)		
(England) Tottenham Hotspur	1–1 (H)			Matchday 3	(Slovenia) Maribor	7–0 (A)		
(England) Tottenham Hotspur	1–3 (A)			Matchday 4	(Slovenia) Maribor	3–0 (H)		
(Cyprus) APOEL	6–0 (A)			Matchday 5	(Spain) Sevilla	3–3 (A)		
(Germany) Borussia Dortmund	3–2 (H)			Matchday 6	(Russia) Spartak Moscow	7–0 (H)		
Group H runners-up: Pos / Team / Pld / Pts; 1 / (England) Tottenham Hotspur / 6 / 16; 2 / (Spain) Real Madrid / 6 / 13; 3 / (Germany) Borussia Dortmund / 6 / 2; 4 / (Cyprus) APOEL / 6 / 2; Source: UEFA				Final standings	Group E winners: Pos / Team / Pld / Pts; 1 / (England) Liverpool / 6 / 12; 2 / (Spain) Sevilla / 6 / 9; 3 / (Russia) Spartak Moscow / 6 / 6; 4 / (Slovenia) Maribor / 6 / 3; Source: UEFA			
Opponent	Agg.	1st leg	2nd leg	Knockout phase	Opponent	Agg.	1st leg	2nd leg
(France) Paris Saint-Germain	5–2	3–1 (H)	2–1 (A)	Round of 16	(Portugal) Porto	5–0	5–0 (A)	0–0 (H)
(Italy) Juventus	4–3	3–0 (A)	1–3 (H)	Quarter-finals	(England) Manchester City	5–1	3–0 (H)	2–1 (A)
(Germany) Bayern Munich	4–3	2–1 (A)	2–2 (H)	Semi-finals	(Italy) Roma	7–6	5–2 (H)	2–4 (A)

== Pre-match ==
=== Ambassador ===
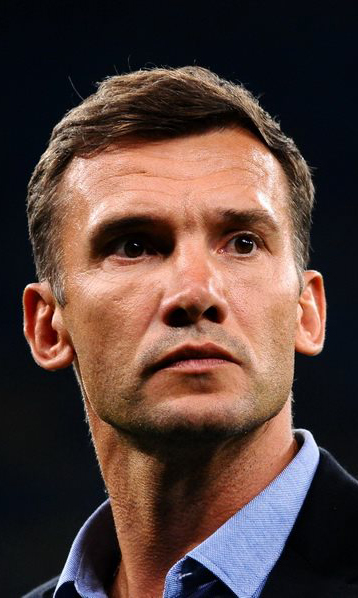
Andriy Shevchenko was named as the ambassador for the final.

The ambassador for the final was former Ukrainian international Andriy Shevchenko, who won the UEFA Champions League with Milan in 2003.

=== Ticketing ===
With a stadium capacity of 63,000 for the final, a total of 40,700 tickets were available to fans and the general public, with the two finalist teams receiving 17,000 tickets each and with 6,700 tickets being available for sale to fans worldwide via UEFA.com from 15 to 22 March 2018 in four price categories: €450, €320, €160, and €70. The remaining tickets were allocated to the local organising committee, UEFA and national associations, commercial partners and broadcasters, and to serve the corporate hospitality programme.

=== Opening ceremony ===
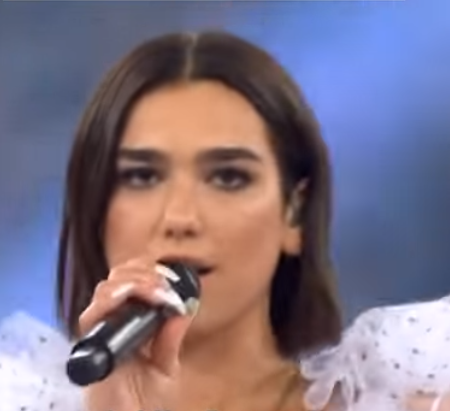
Dua Lipa performing "One Kiss" at the opening ceremony.

English singer Dua Lipa performed at the opening ceremony preceding the final, by singing multiple songs (made by her) including her famous "One Kiss" and the fan-favorite "No Lie". Jamaican rapper Sean Paul joined her as a special guest to perform their collaborative song, "No Lie". The UEFA Champions League Anthem was performed by Croatian cello duo 2Cellos.

=== Related events ===
The 2018 UEFA Women's Champions League final was held two days earlier, on 24 May 2018, at the Valeriy Lobanovskyi Dynamo Stadium between Wolfsburg and Lyon, Lyon emerging victorious 4–1. This was also the last time that the host city for the men's Champions League final was also automatically assigned the Women's Champions League final.

The annual UEFA Champions Festival was held between 24 and 27 May 2018 in the Kyiv city centre.

=== Incidents ===
In late May, The New York Times reported that some fans with allocated tickets had returned them after having trouble finding flights to and accommodation in Kyiv. Locals in Kyiv began offering free accommodation for fans affected by cancelled hotel and apartment arrangements. Several charter flights arranged for Liverpool fans were cancelled, leaving fans with tickets stranded and leading to an unsuccessful search for alternative solutions by the club and city government. Other airlines offered flights to Kyiv from airports in Liverpool and Manchester, using assigned slots at Kyiv's airports.

On 24 May, a group of Liverpool fans were attacked in a restaurant by 20 masked hooligans.

== Match ==
=== Officials ===
On 7 May 2018, UEFA announced that Serbian Milorad Mažić would officiate the final. Mažić has been a FIFA referee since 2009, and gained UEFA's elite referee status in 2013. He was joined by his fellow countrymen, with Milovan Ristić and Dalibor Đurđević as assistant referees, Nenad Đokić and Danilo Grujić as additional assistant referees, and Nemanja Petrović as reserve assistant referee. The fourth official for the final was Frenchman Clément Turpin.

=== Summary ===
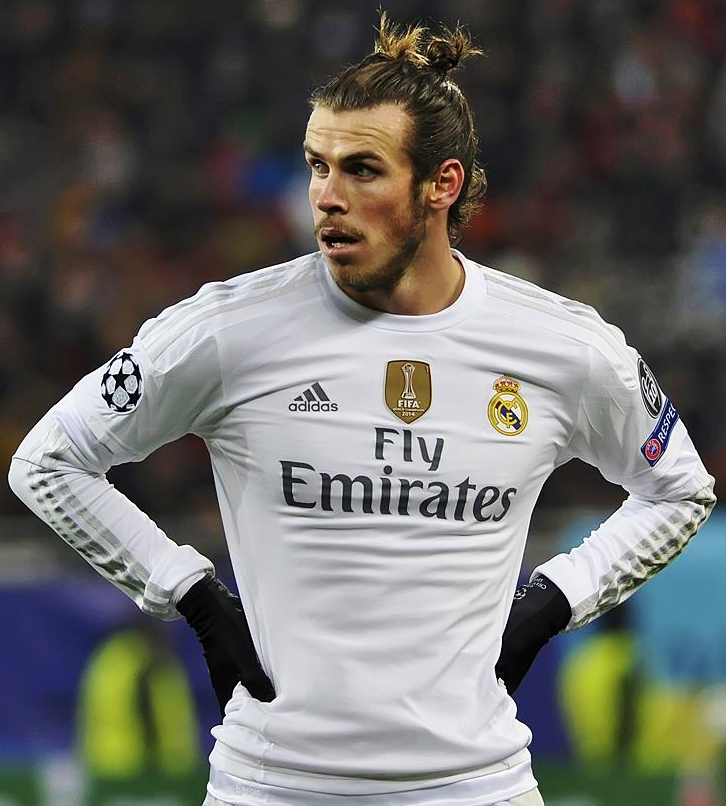
Gareth Bale entered the match as a substitute in the 61st minute and scored two goals for Madrid.

The match began with Liverpool's kickoff and the team's successive attacks to counter Madrid's slower, possession-based buildup. In the 23rd minute, a low shot by Trent Alexander-Arnold went through a defender's legs and forced a late save by Keylor Navas. Two minutes later, Liverpool forward Mohamed Salah was injured competing for the ball with Sergio Ramos, who had locked Salah's arm resulting in a fall. Due to a dislocated shoulder, Salah was substituted four minutes later for Adam Lallana. Madrid's Dani Carvajal was substituted in the 37th minute with a hamstring injury after an unsuccessful backheel. Minutes later, Karim Benzema appeared to score by finishing a shot started by a Cristiano Ronaldo header. His goal was disallowed however because he was judged to have been in an offside position. The first half ended scoreless, with Madrid dominating possession but Liverpool having more chances to score.

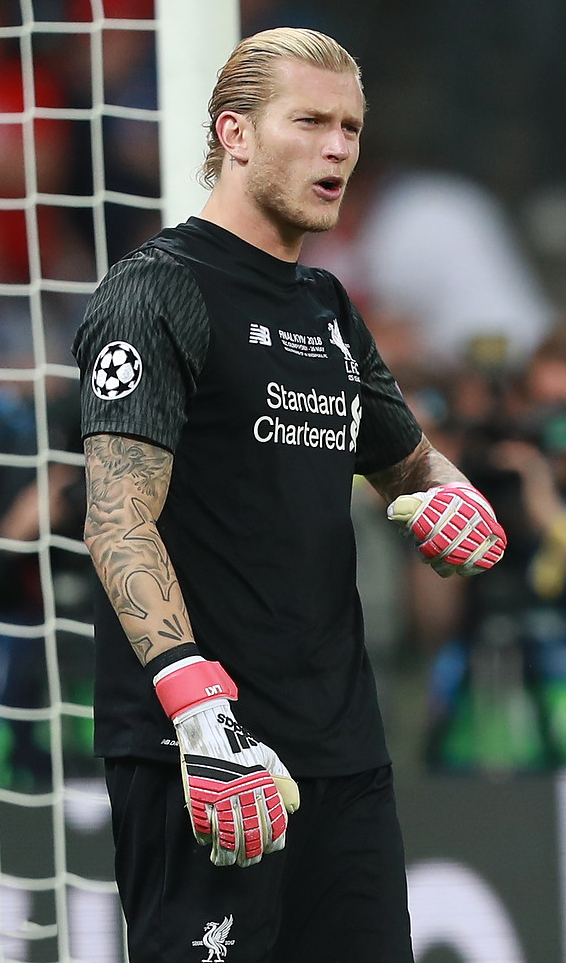
Loris Karius during the game.

The first chance of the second half fell to Isco, who hit the crossbar. In the 51st minute, Benzema scored the match's first goal by deflecting a throw by Liverpool goalkeeper Loris Karius back into the net. Liverpool equalised four minutes later with a tap-in by Sadio Mané, who finished a header by Dejan Lovren after a corner kick by James Milner from the right. Gareth Bale was substituted in for Isco in the 61st minute and scored Madrid's second goal two minutes later, using an acrobatic bicycle kick to finish a cross by Marcelo from the left. Liverpool pressed for a second equalising goal, with a shot by Mané that hit the goal post and calls for a penalty for an alleged handball, but were also losing possession to Madrid. Ronaldo had a chance to score his first goal of the match during a counter-attack in the 73rd minute, but was tackled by Liverpool defender Andy Robertson in the penalty box. Bale scored his second goal of the match in the 83rd minute on a 40-yard (37 m) shot that swerved in front of Karius and went through his hands and into the net. A second chance on goal for Ronaldo in the 93rd minute of play was interrupted by a pitch invader, who was captured by stadium stewards.

=== Details ===
The "home" team (for administrative purposes) was determined by an additional draw held after the semi-final draw, which was held on 13 April 2018, 13:00 CEST, at the UEFA headquarters in Nyon, Switzerland.

26 May 2018
21:45 UTC+3

Real Madrid (Spain)	3–1	(England) Liverpool
Benzema 51'; Bale 63', 83'	Report	Mané 55'

NSC Olimpiyskiy, Kyiv
Attendance: 61,561
Referee: Milorad Mažić (Serbia)

Real Madrid	Liverpool

GK	1	(Costa Rica) Keylor Navas
RB	2	(Spain) Dani Carvajal	(substituted off) 37'
CB	5	(France) Raphaël Varane
CB	4	(Spain) Sergio Ramos (c)
LB	12	(Brazil) Marcelo
DM	14	(Brazil) Casemiro
CM	10	(Croatia) Luka Modrić
CM	8	(Germany) Toni Kroos
AM	22	(Spain) Isco	(substituted off) 61'
CF	9	(France) Karim Benzema	(substituted off) 89'
CF	7	(Portugal) Cristiano Ronaldo
Substitutes:
GK	13	(Spain) Kiko Casilla
DF	6	(Spain) Nacho	(substituted on) 37'
DF	15	(France) Théo Hernandez
MF	20	(Spain) Marco Asensio	(substituted on) 89'
MF	23	(Croatia) Mateo Kovačić
FW	11	(Wales) Gareth Bale	(substituted on) 61'
FW	17	(Spain) Lucas Vázquez
Manager:
(France) Zinedine Zidane

GK	1	(Germany) Loris Karius
RB	66	(England) Trent Alexander-Arnold
CB	6	(Croatia) Dejan Lovren
CB	4	(Netherlands) Virgil van Dijk
LB	26	(Scotland) Andy Robertson
CM	7	(England) James Milner		(substituted off) 83'
CM	14	(England) Jordan Henderson (c)
CM	5	(Netherlands) Georginio Wijnaldum
RF	11	(Egypt) Mohamed Salah		(substituted off) 31'
CF	9	(Brazil) Roberto Firmino
LF	19	(Senegal) Sadio Mané	(yellow card) 82'
Substitutes:
GK	22	(Belgium) Simon Mignolet
DF	2	(England) Nathaniel Clyne
DF	17	(Estonia) Ragnar Klavan
DF	18	(Spain) Alberto Moreno
MF	20	(England) Adam Lallana		(substituted on) 31'
MF	23	(Germany) Emre Can		(substituted on) 83'
FW	29	(England) Dominic Solanke
Manager:
(Germany) Jürgen Klopp

Man of the Match:
Gareth Bale (Real Madrid)

Assistant referees:
Milovan Ristić (Serbia)
Dalibor Đurđević (Serbia)
Fourth official:
Clément Turpin (France)
Additional assistant referees:
Nenad Đokić (Serbia)
Danilo Grujić (Serbia)
Reserve assistant referee:
Nemanja Petrović (Serbia)

Match rules

- 90 minutes.
- 30 minutes of extra time if necessary.
- Penalty shoot-out if scores still level.
- Seven named substitutes, of which up to three may be used.

=== Statistics ===
First half
Statistic	Real Madrid	Liverpool
Goals scored	0	0
Total shots	5	9
Shots on target	0	1
Saves	1	0
Ball possession	65%	35%
Corner kicks	2	2
Fouls committed	2	10
Offsides	4	1
Yellow cards	0	0
Red cards	0	0

Second half
Statistic	Real Madrid	Liverpool
Goals scored	3	1
Total shots	7	3
Shots on target	5	1
Saves	0	2
Ball possession	58%	42%
Corner kicks	7	3
Fouls committed	3	8
Offsides	3	2
Yellow cards	0	1
Red cards	0	0

Overall
Statistic	Real Madrid	Liverpool
Goals scored	3	1
Total shots	12	12
Shots on target	5	2
Saves	1	2
Ball possession	62%	38%
Corner kicks	9	5
Fouls committed	5	18
Offsides	7	3
Yellow cards	0	1
Red cards	0	0

== Post-match ==
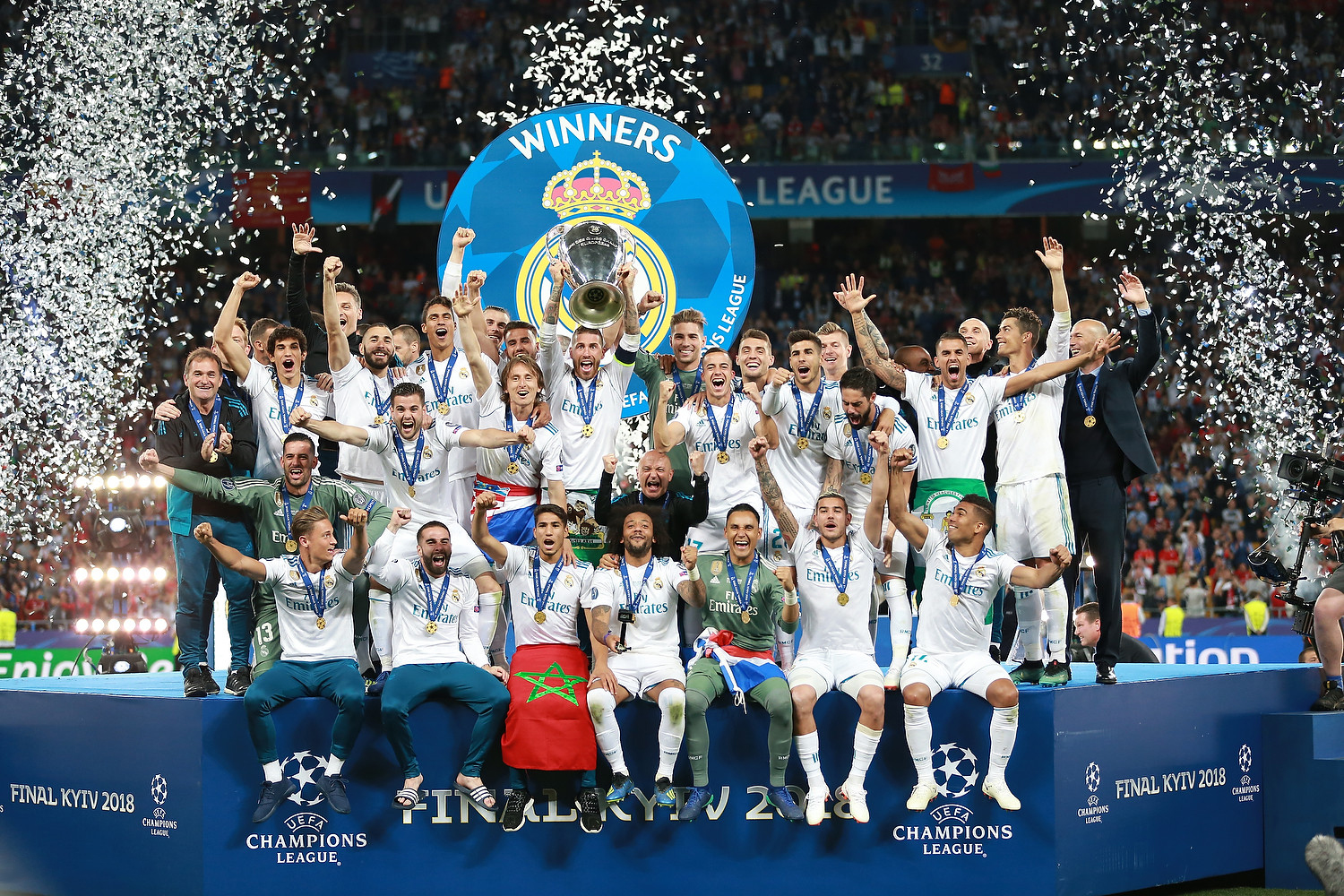
Captain Sergio Ramos hoisting the European Champion Clubs' Cup as Real Madrid celebrate winning the final

Real Madrid became the first team since Bayern Munich in 1974–76 to win three consecutive UEFA Champions Leagues or European Cups. The title was Madrid's 13th, another Champions League record, and their fourth in five years. Real Madrid's victory was the fifth consecutive title for a Spanish side in the Champions League, becoming the longest run for the trophy to be held by teams from the same country since English sides won six consecutive titles between 1977 and 1982.

Manager Zinedine Zidane became the first to win three consecutive Champions League titles and matched Carlo Ancelotti's record of Champions League era wins. Five days after the final, Zidane announced that he would step down as manager in favour of a "different voice". Cristiano Ronaldo became the first player to win the Champions League five times, surpassing the record set by Clarence Seedorf in 2007 and by Andrés Iniesta in 2015. The match also served as the last game for Cristiano Ronaldo at Real Madrid, as he subsequently moved to Juventus in July.

Gareth Bale became the first substitute to score two goals in a Champions League final and was named man of the match. His first goal received acclaim as one of the best in Champions League history and was compared to Ronaldo's bicycle kick goal against Juventus in the quarter-final and manager Zinedine Zidane's goal in the 2002 final.

Sergio Ramos's tackle on Mohamed Salah received mixed reactions from the press and fans on whether the injury was the result of a deliberate blow or an accident. Egyptian fans responded with anger on social media, including insults that became trending topics on Twitter. A Change.org petition calling on UEFA and FIFA to punish Ramos for the challenge received 400,000 signatures within two days. A separate incident involving Ramos and Liverpool goalkeeper Loris Karius raised questions after a video showed him allegedly elbowing Karius in the face prior to his first goalkeeping error. UEFA declined to take action against Ramos for the incident with Karius. After an examination, on 4 June 2018, physiatrist Ross Zafonte at the Massachusetts General Hospital said in a statement that Karius suffered a concussion during the match and that, according to him, it was possible the concussion could have affected the player's performance.

Liverpool manager Jürgen Klopp lost his sixth of seven major finals, including Champions League and league cups. After the match, Loris Karius tearfully apologised to Liverpool supporters who remained in the stands and stated that his mistakes "lost the team the final". After the match, he received online death threats and hate messages directed at him and his family. The game would end up being Karius's last competitive match for Liverpool, as he went on loans to Beşiktaş and Union Berlin before departing for Newcastle United in 2022.

== See also ==
- 1981 European Cup final – contested by same teams
- 2022 UEFA Champions League final – contested by same teams
- 2017–18 Liverpool F.C. season
- 2017–18 Real Madrid CF season
- 2018 UEFA Europa League final
- 2018 UEFA Women's Champions League final
- Liverpool F.C. in international football
- Real Madrid CF in international football
