= 2017–18 UEFA Champions League knockout phase =

International football competition

The 2017–18 UEFA Champions League knockout phase began on 13 February and ended on 26 May 2018 with the final at the NSC Olimpiyskiy in Kyiv, Ukraine, to decide the champions of the 2017–18 UEFA Champions League. A total of 16 teams competed in the knockout phase.

Times are CET/CEST, (Note: CET (UTC+1) for matches to 14 March 2018, and CEST (UTC+2) for matches from 3 April 2018.) as listed by UEFA (local times, if different, are in parentheses).

== Round and draw dates ==
The schedule of the knockout phase was as follows (all draws were held at the UEFA headquarters in Nyon, Switzerland).

Round	Draw	First leg	Second leg
Round of 16	11 December 2017	13–14 & 20–21 February 2018	6–7 & 13–14 March 2018
Quarter-finals	16 March 2018	3–4 April 2018	10–11 April 2018
Semi-finals	13 April 2018	24–25 April 2018	1–2 May 2018
Final	13 April 2018	26 May 2018 at NSC Olimpiyskiy, Kyiv	

== Format ==
The knockout phase involved the 16 teams which qualified as winners and runners-up of each of the eight groups in the group stage.

Each tie in the knockout phase, apart from the final, was played over two legs, with each team playing one leg at home. The team that scored more goals on aggregate over the two legs advanced to the next round. If the aggregate score was level, the away goals rule was applied, i.e. the team that scored more goals away from home over the two legs advanced. If away goals were also equal, then thirty minutes of extra time were played. The away goals rule was again applied after extra time, i.e. if there were goals scored during extra time and the aggregate score was still level, the visiting team advanced by virtue of more away goals scored. If no goals were scored during extra time, the tie was decided by penalty shoot-out. In the final, which was played as a single match, if scores were level at the end of normal time, extra time was played, followed by a penalty shoot-out if scores remained tied.

The mechanism of the draws for each round was as follows:

- In the draw for the round of 16, the eight group winners were seeded, and the eight group runners-up were unseeded. The seeded teams were drawn against the unseeded teams, with the seeded teams hosting the second leg. Teams from the same group or the same association could not be drawn against each other.
- In the draws for the quarter-finals onwards, there were no seedings, and teams from the same group or the same association could be drawn against each other.

== Qualified teams ==
Group	Winners (seeded in round of 16 draw)	Runners-up (unseeded in round of 16 draw)
A	(England) Manchester United	(Switzerland) Basel
B	(France) Paris Saint-Germain	(Germany) Bayern Munich
C	(Italy) Roma	(England) Chelsea
D	(Spain) Barcelona	(Italy) Juventus
E	(England) Liverpool	(Spain) Sevilla
F	(England) Manchester City	(Ukraine) Shakhtar Donetsk
G	(Turkey) Beşiktaş	(Portugal) Porto
H	(England) Tottenham Hotspur	(Spain) Real Madrid

== Bracket ==
Round of 16
(Spain) Sevilla	0	2	2
(England) Manchester United	0	1	1
(Germany) Bayern Munich	5	3	8
(Turkey) Beşiktaş	0	1	1
(Italy) Juventus	2	2	4
(England) Tottenham Hotspur	2	1	3
(Spain) Real Madrid	3	2	5
(France) Paris Saint-Germain	1	1	2
(Portugal) Porto	0	0	0
(England) Liverpool	5	0	5
(Switzerland) Basel	0	2	2
(England) Manchester City	4	1	5
(England) Chelsea	1	0	1
(Spain) Barcelona	1	3	4
(Ukraine) Shakhtar Donetsk	2	0	2
(Italy) Roma (a)	1	1	2

Quarter-finals
(Spain) Sevilla	1	0	1
(Germany) Bayern Munich	2	0	2
(Italy) Juventus	0	3	3
(Spain) Real Madrid	3	1	4
(England) Liverpool	3	2	5
(England) Manchester City	0	1	1
(Spain) Barcelona	4	0	4
(Italy) Roma (a)	1	3	4

Semi-finals
(Germany) Bayern Munich	1	2	3
(Spain) Real Madrid	2	2	4
(England) Liverpool	5	2	7
(Italy) Roma	2	4	6

Final
26 May – Kyiv
(Spain) Real Madrid	3
(England) Liverpool	1

== Round of 16 ==
The draw for the round of 16 was held on 11 December 2017, 12:00 CET.

With five English teams in the round of 16, this was the first time five teams from one association qualified for the Champions League knockout phase.

=== Summary ===
The first legs were played on 13, 14, 20 and 21 February, and the second legs were played on 6, 7, 13 and 14 March 2018.

Team 1	Agg.	Team 2	1st leg	2nd leg
Juventus (Italy)	4–3	(England) Tottenham Hotspur	2–2	2–1
Basel (Switzerland)	2–5	(England) Manchester City	0–4	2–1
Porto (Portugal)	0–5	(England) Liverpool	0–5	0–0
Sevilla (Spain)	2–1	(England) Manchester United	0–0	2–1
Real Madrid (Spain)	5–2	(France) Paris Saint-Germain	3–1	2–1
Shakhtar Donetsk (Ukraine)	2–2 (a)	(Italy) Roma	2–1	0–1
Chelsea (England)	1–4	(Spain) Barcelona	1–1	0–3
Bayern Munich (Germany)	8–1	(Turkey) Beşiktaş	5–0	3–1

=== Matches ===
13 February 2018
20:45

Juventus (Italy)	2–2	(England) Tottenham Hotspur
Higuaín 2', 9' (pen.)	Report	Kane 35'; Eriksen 71'

Juventus Stadium, Turin
Attendance: 41,232
Referee: Felix Brych (Germany)
7 March 2018
20:45 (19:45 UTC+0)

Tottenham Hotspur (England)	1–2	(Italy) Juventus
Son Heung-min 39'	Report	Higuaín 64'; Dybala 67'

Wembley Stadium, London
Attendance: 84,010
Referee: Szymon Marciniak (Poland)

Juventus won 4–3 on aggregate.

13 February 2018
20:45

Basel (Switzerland)	0–4	(England) Manchester City
	Report	Gündoğan 14', 53'; B. Silva 18'; Agüero 23'

St. Jakob-Park, Basel
Attendance: 36,000
Referee: Jonas Eriksson (Sweden)
7 March 2018
20:45 (19:45 UTC+0)

Manchester City (England)	1–2	(Switzerland) Basel
Gabriel Jesus 8'	Report	Elyounoussi 17'; Lang 71'

City of Manchester Stadium, Manchester
Attendance: 49,411
Referee: Pavel Královec (Czech Republic)

Manchester City won 5–2 on aggregate.

14 February 2018
20:45 (19:45 UTC+0)

Porto (Portugal)	0–5	(England) Liverpool
	Report	Mané 25', 53', 85'; Salah 29'; Firmino 69'

Estádio do Dragão, Porto
Attendance: 47,718
Referee: Daniele Orsato (Italy)
6 March 2018
20:45 (19:45 UTC+0)

Liverpool (England)	0–0	(Portugal) Porto
	Report

Anfield, Liverpool
Attendance: 48,768
Referee: Felix Zwayer (Germany)

Liverpool won 5–0 on aggregate.

21 February 2018
20:45

Sevilla (Spain)	0–0	(England) Manchester United
	Report

Ramón Sánchez Pizjuán, Seville
Attendance: 39,725
Referee: Clément Turpin (France)
13 March 2018
20:45 (19:45 UTC+0)

Manchester United (England)	1–2	(Spain) Sevilla
Lukaku 84'	Report	Ben Yedder 74', 78'

Old Trafford, Manchester
Attendance: 74,909
Referee: Danny Makkelie (Netherlands)

Sevilla won 2–1 on aggregate.

14 February 2018
20:45

Real Madrid (Spain)	3–1	(France) Paris Saint-Germain
Ronaldo 45' (pen.), 83'; Marcelo 86'	Report	Rabiot 33'

Santiago Bernabéu, Madrid
Attendance: 78,158
Referee: Gianluca Rocchi (Italy)
6 March 2018
20:45

Paris Saint-Germain (France)	1–2	(Spain) Real Madrid
Cavani 71'	Report	Ronaldo 51'; Casemiro 80'

Parc des Princes, Paris
Attendance: 46,585
Referee: Felix Brych (Germany)

Real Madrid won 5–2 on aggregate.

21 February 2018
20:45 (21:45 UTC+2)

Shakhtar Donetsk (Ukraine)	2–1	(Italy) Roma
Ferreyra 52'; Fred 71'	Report	Ünder 41'

Metalist Stadium, Kharkiv (Note: Shakhtar Donetsk played their home match at Metalist Stadium, Kharkiv, instead of their regular stadium, the Donbas Arena in Donetsk, due to the war in Donbas.)
Attendance: 35,124
Referee: Willie Collum (Scotland)
13 March 2018
20:45

Roma (Italy)	1–0	(Ukraine) Shakhtar Donetsk
Džeko 52'	Report

Stadio Olimpico, Rome
Attendance: 47,693
Referee: Alberto Undiano Mallenco (Spain)

2–2 on aggregate; Roma won on away goals.

20 February 2018
20:45 (19:45 UTC+0)

Chelsea (England)	1–1	(Spain) Barcelona
Willian 62'	Report	Messi 75'

Stamford Bridge, London
Attendance: 37,741
Referee: Cüneyt Çakır (Turkey)
14 March 2018
20:45

Barcelona (Spain)	3–0	(England) Chelsea
Messi 3', 63'; Dembélé 20'	Report

Camp Nou, Barcelona
Attendance: 97,183
Referee: Damir Skomina (Slovenia)

Barcelona won 4–1 on aggregate.

20 February 2018
20:45

Bayern Munich (Germany)	5–0	(Turkey) Beşiktaş
Müller 43', 66'; Coman 53'; Lewandowski 79', 88'	Report

Allianz Arena, Munich
Attendance: 70,000
Referee: Ovidiu Hațegan (Romania)
14 March 2018
18:00 (20:00 UTC+3)

Beşiktaş (Turkey)	1–3	(Germany) Bayern Munich
Vágner Love 59'	Report	Thiago 18'; Gönül 46' (o.g.); Wagner 84'

Vodafone Park, Istanbul
Attendance: 36,885
Referee: Michael Oliver (England)

Bayern Munich won 8–1 on aggregate.

== Quarter-finals ==
The draw for the quarter-finals was held on 16 March 2018, 12:00 CET.

=== Summary ===
The first legs were played on 3 and 4 April, and the second legs were played on 10 and 11 April 2018.

Team 1	Agg.	Team 2	1st leg	2nd leg
Barcelona (Spain)	4–4 (a)	(Italy) Roma	4–1	0–3
Sevilla (Spain)	1–2	(Germany) Bayern Munich	1–2	0–0
Juventus (Italy)	3–4	(Spain) Real Madrid	0–3	3–1
Liverpool (England)	5–1	(England) Manchester City	3–0	2–1

=== Matches ===
4 April 2018
20:45

Barcelona (Spain)	4–1	(Italy) Roma
De Rossi 38' (o.g.); Manolas 55' (o.g.); Piqué 59'; L. Suárez 87'	Report	Džeko 80'

Camp Nou, Barcelona
Attendance: 90,106
Referee: Danny Makkelie (Netherlands)
10 April 2018
20:45

Roma (Italy)	3–0	(Spain) Barcelona
Džeko 6'; De Rossi 58' (pen.); Manolas 82'	Report

Stadio Olimpico, Rome
Attendance: 56,580
Referee: Clément Turpin (France)

4–4 on aggregate; Roma won on away goals.

3 April 2018
20:45

Sevilla (Spain)	1–2	(Germany) Bayern Munich
Sarabia 31'	Report	Navas 37' (o.g.); Thiago 68'

Ramón Sánchez Pizjuán, Seville
Attendance: 40,635
Referee: Daniele Orsato (Italy)
11 April 2018
20:45

Bayern Munich (Germany)	0–0	(Spain) Sevilla
	Report

Allianz Arena, Munich
Attendance: 70,000
Referee: Willie Collum (Scotland)

Bayern Munich won 2–1 on aggregate.

3 April 2018
20:45

Juventus (Italy)	0–3	(Spain) Real Madrid
	Report	Ronaldo 3', 64'; Marcelo 72'

Juventus Stadium, Turin
Attendance: 40,849
Referee: Cüneyt Çakır (Turkey)
11 April 2018
20:45

Real Madrid (Spain)	1–3	(Italy) Juventus
Ronaldo 90+8' (pen.)	Report	Mandžukić 2', 37'; Matuidi 61'

Santiago Bernabéu, Madrid
Attendance: 75,796
Referee: Michael Oliver (England)

Real Madrid won 4–3 on aggregate.

4 April 2018
20:45 (19:45 UTC+1)

Liverpool (England)	3–0	(England) Manchester City
Salah 12'; Oxlade-Chamberlain 21'; Mané 31'	Report

Anfield, Liverpool
Attendance: 50,685
Referee: Felix Brych (Germany)
10 April 2018
20:45 (19:45 UTC+1)

Manchester City (England)	1–2	(England) Liverpool
Gabriel Jesus 2'	Report	Salah 56'; Firmino 77'

City of Manchester Stadium, Manchester
Attendance: 53,461
Referee: Antonio Mateu Lahoz (Spain)

Liverpool won 5–1 on aggregate.

== Semi-finals ==
The draw for the semi-finals was held on 13 April 2018, 13:00 CEST.

For the first time since the 2009–10 UEFA Champions League, all the four teams at this stage represent different national associations.

=== Summary ===
The first legs were played on 24 and 25 April, and the second legs were played on 1 and 2 May 2018.

Team 1	Agg.	Team 2	1st leg	2nd leg
Bayern Munich (Germany)	3–4	(Spain) Real Madrid	1–2	2–2
Liverpool (England)	7–6	(Italy) Roma	5–2	2–4

=== Matches ===
25 April 2018
20:45

Bayern Munich (Germany)	1–2	(Spain) Real Madrid
Kimmich 28'	Report	Marcelo 44'; Asensio 57'

Allianz Arena, Munich
Attendance: 70,000
Referee: Björn Kuipers (Netherlands)
1 May 2018
20:45

Real Madrid (Spain)	2–2	(Germany) Bayern Munich
Benzema 11', 46'	Report	Kimmich 3'; Rodríguez 63'

Santiago Bernabéu, Madrid
Attendance: 77,459
Referee: Cüneyt Çakır (Turkey)

Real Madrid won 4–3 on aggregate.

24 April 2018
20:45 (19:45 UTC+1)

Liverpool (England)	5–2	(Italy) Roma
Salah 36', 45+1'; Mané 56'; Firmino 61', 69'	Report	Džeko 81'; Perotti 85' (pen.)

Anfield, Liverpool
Attendance: 51,236
Referee: Felix Brych (Germany)
2 May 2018
20:45

Roma (Italy)	4–2	(England) Liverpool
Milner 15' (o.g.); Džeko 52'; Nainggolan 86', 90+4' (pen.)	Report	Mané 9'; Wijnaldum 25'

Stadio Olimpico, Rome
Attendance: 61,889
Referee: Damir Skomina (Slovenia)

Liverpool won 7–6 on aggregate.

== Final ==
The final was played at the NSC Olimpiyskiy in Kyiv on 26 May 2018. The "home" team (for administrative purposes) was determined by an additional draw held after the semi-final draw.

26 May 2018
20:45 (21:45 UTC+3)

Real Madrid (Spain)	3–1	(England) Liverpool
Benzema 51'; Bale 63', 83'	Report	Mané 55'

NSC Olimpiyskiy, Kyiv
Attendance: 61,561
Referee: Milorad Mažić (Serbia)
