= 2017–18 UEFA Europa League knockout phase =

International football competition

The 2017–18 UEFA Europa League knockout phase began on 13 February and ended on 16 May 2018 with the final at the Parc Olympique Lyonnais in Décines-Charpieu, France, to decide the champions of the 2017–18 UEFA Europa League. A total of 32 teams competed in the knockout phase.

Times up to 24 March 2018 (round of 32 and round of 16) are CET (UTC+1), thereafter (quarter-finals and beyond) times are CEST (UTC+2).

== Round and draw dates ==
The schedule of the knockout phase is as follows (all draws were held at the UEFA headquarters in Nyon, Switzerland).

Round	Draw	First leg	Second leg
Round of 32	11 December 2017	15 February 2018	22 February 2018
Round of 16	23 February 2018	8 March 2018	15 March 2018
Quarter-finals	16 March 2018	5 April 2018	12 April 2018
Semi-finals	13 April 2018	26 April 2018	3 May 2018
Final	13 April 2018	16 May 2018 at Parc Olympique Lyonnais, Décines-Charpieu	

Matches may also be played on Tuesdays or Wednesdays instead of the regular Thursdays due to scheduling conflicts.

== Format ==
The knockout phase involves 32 teams: the 24 teams which qualify as winners and runners-up of each of the twelve groups in the group stage, and the eight third-placed teams from the Champions League group stage.

Each tie in the knockout phase, apart from the final, is played over two legs, with each team playing one leg at home. The team that scores more goals on aggregate over the two legs advance to the next round. If the aggregate score is level, the away goals rule is applied, i.e. the team that scored more goals away from home over the two legs advances. If away goals are also equal, then thirty minutes of extra time is played. The away goals rule is again applied after extra time, i.e. if there are goals scored during extra time and the aggregate score is still level, the visiting team advances by virtue of more away goals scored. If no goals are scored during extra time, the tie is decided by penalty shoot-out. In the final, which is played as a single match, if scores are level at the end of normal time, extra time is played, followed by penalty shoot-out if scores remain tied.

The mechanism of the draws for each round is as follows:

- In the draw for the round of 32, the twelve group winners and the four third-placed teams from the Champions League group stage with the better group records are seeded, and the twelve group runners-up and the other four third-placed teams from the Champions League group stage are unseeded. The seeded teams are drawn against the unseeded teams, with the seeded teams hosting the second leg. Teams from the same group or the same association cannot be drawn against each other.
- In the draws for the round of 16 onwards, there are no seedings, and teams from the same group or the same association can be drawn against each other.

On 17 July 2014, the UEFA emergency panel ruled that Ukrainian and Russian clubs would not be drawn against each other "until further notice" due to the political unrest between the countries.

== Qualified teams ==
=== Europa League group stage winners and runners-up ===
Group	Winners (seeded in round of 32 draw)	Runners-up (unseeded in round of 32 draw)
A	(Spain) Villarreal	(Kazakhstan) Astana
B	(Ukraine) Dynamo Kyiv	(Serbia) Partizan
C	(Portugal) Braga	(Bulgaria) Ludogorets Razgrad
D	(Italy) Milan	(Greece) AEK Athens
E	(Italy) Atalanta	(France) Lyon
F	(Russia) Lokomotiv Moscow	(Denmark) Copenhagen
G	(Czech Republic) Viktoria Plzeň	(Romania) FCSB
H	(England) Arsenal	(Serbia) Red Star Belgrade
I	(Austria) Red Bull Salzburg	(France) Marseille
J	(Spain) Athletic Bilbao	(Sweden) Östersunds FK
K	(Italy) Lazio	(France) Nice
L	(Russia) Zenit Saint Petersburg	(Spain) Real Sociedad

=== Champions League group stage third-placed teams ===
Seed	Grp	Team	Pld	W	D	L	GF	GA	GD	Pts	Seeding
1	A	(Russia) CSKA Moscow	6	3	0	3	8	10	−2	9	Seeded in round of 32 draw
2	C	(Spain) Atlético Madrid	6	1	4	1	5	4	+1	7	Seeded in round of 32 draw
3	G	(Germany) RB Leipzig	6	2	1	3	10	11	−1	7	Seeded in round of 32 draw
4	D	(Portugal) Sporting CP	6	2	1	3	8	9	−1	7	Seeded in round of 32 draw
5	F	(Italy) Napoli	6	2	0	4	11	11	0	6	Unseeded in round of 32 draw
6	E	(Russia) Spartak Moscow	6	1	3	2	9	13	−4	6	Unseeded in round of 32 draw
7	B	(Scotland) Celtic	6	1	0	5	5	18	−13	3	Unseeded in round of 32 draw
8	H	(Germany) Borussia Dortmund	6	0	2	4	7	13	−6	2	Unseeded in round of 32 draw

Source: UEFA
Rules for classification: 1) Points; 2) Goal difference; 3) Goals scored; 4) Away goals scored; 5) Wins; 6) Away wins; 7) Disciplinary points; 8) Club coefficient (UCL Regulations Article 16.04).

== Bracket ==
Round of 32
(Italy) Napoli	1	2	3
(Germany) RB Leipzig (a)	3	0	3
(Scotland) Celtic	1	0	1
(Russia) Zenit Saint Petersburg	0	3	3
(France) Marseille	3	0	3
(Portugal) Braga	0	1	1
(Russia) Spartak Moscow	1	2	3
(Spain) Athletic Bilbao	3	1	4
(Romania) FCSB	1	1	2
(Italy) Lazio	0	5	5
(Greece) AEK Athens	1	0	1
(Ukraine) Dynamo Kyiv (a)	1	0	1
(Germany) Borussia Dortmund	3	1	4
(Italy) Atalanta	2	1	3
(Spain) Real Sociedad	2	1	3
(Austria) Red Bull Salzburg	2	2	4
(Bulgaria) Ludogorets Razgrad	0	0	0
(Italy) Milan	3	1	4
(Sweden) Östersunds FK	0	2	2
(England) Arsenal	3	1	4
(Serbia) Red Star Belgrade	0	0	0
(Russia) CSKA Moscow	0	1	1
(France) Lyon	3	1	4
(Spain) Villarreal	1	0	1
(Denmark) Copenhagen	1	0	1
(Spain) Atlético Madrid	4	1	5
(France) Nice	2	0	2
(Russia) Lokomotiv Moscow	3	1	4
(Kazakhstan) Astana	1	3	4
(Portugal) Sporting CP	3	3	6
(Serbia) Partizan	1	0	1
(Czech Republic) Viktoria Plzeň	1	2	3

Round of 16
(Germany) RB Leipzig	2	1	3
(Russia) Zenit Saint Petersburg	1	1	2
(France) Marseille	3	2	5
(Spain) Athletic Bilbao	1	1	2
(Italy) Lazio	2	2	4
(Ukraine) Dynamo Kyiv	2	0	2
(Germany) Borussia Dortmund	1	0	1
(Austria) Red Bull Salzburg	2	0	2
(Italy) Milan	0	1	1
(England) Arsenal	2	3	5
(Russia) CSKA Moscow (a)	0	3	3
(France) Lyon	1	2	3
(Spain) Atlético Madrid	3	5	8
(Russia) Lokomotiv Moscow	0	1	1
(Portugal) Sporting CP (a.e.t.)	2	1	3
(Czech Republic) Viktoria Plzeň	0	2	2

Quarter-finals
(Germany) RB Leipzig	1	2	3
(France) Marseille	0	5	5
(Italy) Lazio	4	1	5
(Austria) Red Bull Salzburg	2	4	6
(England) Arsenal	4	2	6
(Russia) CSKA Moscow	1	2	3
(Spain) Atlético Madrid	2	0	2
(Portugal) Sporting CP	0	1	1

Semi-finals
(France) Marseille (a.e.t.)	2	1	3
(Austria) Red Bull Salzburg	0	2	2
(England) Arsenal	1	0	1
(Spain) Atlético Madrid	1	1	2

Final
16 May – Décines-Charpieu
(France) Marseille	0
(Spain) Atlético Madrid	3

== Round of 32 ==
The draw for the round of 32 was held on 11 December 2017, 13:00 CET.

=== Summary ===
The first legs were played on 13 and 15 February, and the second legs were played on 21 and 22 February 2018.

Team 1	Agg.	Team 2	1st leg	2nd leg
Borussia Dortmund (Germany)	4–3	(Italy) Atalanta	3–2	1–1
Nice (France)	2–4	(Russia) Lokomotiv Moscow	2–3	0–1
Copenhagen (Denmark)	1–5	(Spain) Atlético Madrid	1–4	0–1
Spartak Moscow (Russia)	3–4	(Spain) Athletic Bilbao	1–3	2–1
AEK Athens (Greece)	1–1 (a)	(Ukraine) Dynamo Kyiv	1–1	0–0
Celtic (Scotland)	1–3	(Russia) Zenit Saint Petersburg	1–0	0–3
Napoli (Italy)	3–3 (a)	(Germany) RB Leipzig	1–3	2–0
Red Star Belgrade (Serbia)	0–1	(Russia) CSKA Moscow	0–0	0–1
Lyon (France)	4–1	(Spain) Villarreal	3–1	1–0
Real Sociedad (Spain)	3–4	(Austria) Red Bull Salzburg	2–2	1–2
Partizan (Serbia)	1–3	(Czech Republic) Viktoria Plzeň	1–1	0–2
FCSB (Romania)	2–5	(Italy) Lazio	1–0	1–5
Ludogorets Razgrad (Bulgaria)	0–4	(Italy) Milan	0–3	0–1
Astana (Kazakhstan)	4–6	(Portugal) Sporting CP	1–3	3–3
Östersunds FK (Sweden)	2–4	(England) Arsenal	0–3	2–1
Marseille (France)	3–1	(Portugal) Braga	3–0	0–1

=== Matches ===
15 February 2018
19:00

Borussia Dortmund (Germany)	3–2	(Italy) Atalanta
Schürrle 30'; Batshuayi 65', 90+1'	Report	Iličić 51', 56'

Westfalenstadion, Dortmund
Attendance: 62,500
Referee: Daniel Stefański (Poland)
22 February 2018
21:05

Atalanta (Italy)	1–1	(Germany) Borussia Dortmund
Tolói 11'	Report	Schmelzer 83'

Mapei Stadium – Città del Tricolore, Reggio Emilia (Note: Atalanta played their home match at Mapei Stadium – Città del Tricolore, Reggio Emilia, instead of their regular stadium Stadio Atleti Azzurri d'Italia, Bergamo, which wasn't given a UEFA licence to hold games.)
Attendance: 17,492
Referee: Jesús Gil Manzano (Spain)

Borussia Dortmund won 4–3 on aggregate.

15 February 2018
19:00

Nice (France)	2–3	(Russia) Lokomotiv Moscow
Balotelli 4', 28' (pen.)	Report	Fernandes 45' (pen.), 69', 77'

Allianz Riviera, Nice
Attendance: 16,918
Referee: István Kovács (Romania)
22 February 2018
17:00

Lokomotiv Moscow (Russia)	1–0	(France) Nice
Denisov 30'	Report

RZD Arena, Moscow
Attendance: 18,104
Referee: Pavel Královec (Czech Republic)

Lokomotiv Moscow won 4–2 on aggregate.

15 February 2018
21:05

Copenhagen (Denmark)	1–4	(Spain) Atlético Madrid
Fischer 15'	Report	Saúl 21'; Gameiro 37'; Griezmann 71'; Vitolo 77'

Parken Stadium, Copenhagen
Attendance: 34,912
Referee: Aleksei Kulbakov (Belarus)
22 February 2018
19:00

Atlético Madrid (Spain)	1–0	(Denmark) Copenhagen
Gameiro 7'	Report

Wanda Metropolitano, Madrid
Attendance: 44,035
Referee: Gediminas Mažeika (Lithuania)

Atlético Madrid won 5–1 on aggregate.

15 February 2018
19:00

Spartak Moscow (Russia)	1–3	(Spain) Athletic Bilbao
Luiz Adriano 60'	Report	Aduriz 22', 39'; Kutepov 45+1' (o.g.)

Otkritie Arena, Moscow
Attendance: 43,145
Referee: Benoît Bastien (France)
22 February 2018
21:05

Athletic Bilbao (Spain)	1–2	(Russia) Spartak Moscow
Etxeita 57'	Report	Luiz Adriano 44'; Melgarejo 85'

San Mamés, Bilbao
Attendance: 36,873
Referee: Tobias Stieler (Germany)

Athletic Bilbao won 4–3 on aggregate.

15 February 2018
21:05

AEK Athens (Greece)	1–1	(Ukraine) Dynamo Kyiv
Ajdarević 80'	Report	Tsyhankov 19'

Olympic Stadium, Athens
Attendance: 30,518
Referee: Carlos del Cerro Grande (Spain)
22 February 2018
19:00

Dynamo Kyiv (Ukraine)	0–0	(Greece) AEK Athens
	Report

NSC Olimpiyskiy Stadium, Kyiv
Attendance: 27,024
Referee: Matej Jug (Slovenia)

1–1 on aggregate; Dynamo Kyiv won on away goals.

15 February 2018
21:05

Celtic (Scotland)	1–0	(Russia) Zenit Saint Petersburg
McGregor 78'	Report

Celtic Park, Glasgow
Attendance: 56,743
Referee: Damir Skomina (Slovenia)
22 February 2018
19:00

Zenit Saint Petersburg (Russia)	3–0	(Scotland) Celtic
Ivanović 8'; Kuzyayev 27'; Kokorin 61'	Report

Krestovsky Stadium, Saint Petersburg
Attendance: 50,492
Referee: Antonio Mateu Lahoz (Spain)

Zenit Saint Petersburg won 3–1 on aggregate.

15 February 2018
21:05

Napoli (Italy)	1–3	(Germany) RB Leipzig
Ounas 52'	Report	Werner 61', 90+3'; Bruma 74'

Stadio San Paolo, Naples
Attendance: 14,554
Referee: Artur Soares Dias (Portugal)
22 February 2018
19:00

RB Leipzig (Germany)	0–2	(Italy) Napoli
	Report	Zieliński 33'; Insigne 86'

Red Bull Arena, Leipzig
Attendance: 36,163
Referee: Anthony Taylor (England)

3–3 on aggregate; RB Leipzig won on away goals.

13 February 2018 (Note: The Red Star Belgrade v CSKA Moscow match was scheduled on 13 February in order to avoid a scheduling conflict with the Partizan v Viktoria Plzeň match, in the same city.)
18:00

Red Star Belgrade (Serbia)	0–0	(Russia) CSKA Moscow
	Report

Red Star Stadium, Belgrade
Attendance: 35,642
Referee: Paweł Raczkowski (Poland)
21 February 2018 (Note: The CSKA Moscow v Red Star Belgrade match was scheduled on 21 February in order to avoid a scheduling conflict with the Lokomotiv Moscow v Nice match, in the same city.)
18:00

CSKA Moscow (Russia)	1–0	(Serbia) Red Star Belgrade
Dzagoev 45+1'	Report

VEB Arena, Moscow
Attendance: 18,753
Referee: Jorge Sousa (Portugal)

CSKA Moscow won 1–0 on aggregate.

15 February 2018
21:05

Lyon (France)	3–1	(Spain) Villarreal
Ndombele 46'; Fekir 49'; Depay 82'	Report	Fornals 63'

Parc Olympique Lyonnais, Décines-Charpieu
Attendance: 46,846
Referee: Viktor Kassai (Hungary)
22 February 2018
19:00

Villarreal (Spain)	0–1	(France) Lyon
	Report	Traoré 85'

Estadio de la Cerámica, Villarreal
Attendance: 17,028
Referee: Luca Banti (Italy)

Lyon won 4–1 on aggregate.

15 February 2018
19:00

Real Sociedad (Spain)	2–2	(Austria) Red Bull Salzburg
Odriozola 57'; Januzaj 80'	Report	Oyarzabal 27' (o.g.); Minamino 90+4'

Anoeta, San Sebastián
Attendance: 19,790
Referee: Bobby Madden (Scotland)
22 February 2018
21:05

Red Bull Salzburg (Austria)	2–1	(Spain) Real Sociedad
Dabbur 10'; V. Berisha 74' (pen.)	Report	Navas 28'

Red Bull Arena, Wals-Siezenheim
Attendance: 13,912
Referee: Sergei Karasev (Russia)

Red Bull Salzburg won 4–3 on aggregate.

15 February 2018
21:05

Partizan (Serbia)	1–1	(Czech Republic) Viktoria Plzeň
Tawamba 58'	Report	Řezník 81'

Partizan Stadium, Belgrade
Attendance: 17,165
Referee: Anastasios Sidiropoulos (Greece)
22 February 2018
19:00

Viktoria Plzeň (Czech Republic)	2–0	(Serbia) Partizan
Krmenčík 67'; Čermák 90+4'	Report

Doosan Arena, Plzeň
Attendance: 10,185
Referee: Jakob Kehlet (Denmark)

Viktoria Plzeň won 3–1 on aggregate.

15 February 2018
21:05

FCSB (Romania)	1–0	(Italy) Lazio
Gnohéré 29'	Report

Arena Națională, Bucharest
Attendance: 33,455
Referee: Deniz Aytekin (Germany)
22 February 2018
19:00

Lazio (Italy)	5–1	(Romania) FCSB
Immobile 7', 42', 71'; Bastos 35'; Felipe Anderson 51'	Report	Gnohéré 82'

Stadio Olimpico, Rome
Attendance: 27,597
Referee: Slavko Vinčić (Slovenia)

Lazio won 5–2 on aggregate.

15 February 2018
19:00

Ludogorets Razgrad (Bulgaria)	0–3	(Italy) Milan
	Report	Cutrone 45'; Rodríguez 64' (pen.); Borini 90+2'

Ludogorets Arena, Razgrad
Attendance: 7,887
Referee: Milorad Mažić (Serbia)
22 February 2018
21:05

Milan (Italy)	1–0	(Bulgaria) Ludogorets Razgrad
Borini 21'	Report

San Siro, Milan
Attendance: 17,453
Referee: Alberto Undiano Mallenco (Spain)

Milan won 4–0 on aggregate.

15 February 2018
17:00

Astana (Kazakhstan)	1–3	(Portugal) Sporting CP
Tomasov 7'	Report	Fernandes 48' (pen.); Martins 50'; Doumbia 56'

Astana Arena, Astana
Attendance: 29,737
Referee: Ruddy Buquet (France)
22 February 2018
19:00

Sporting CP (Portugal)	3–3	(Kazakhstan) Astana
Dost 3'; Fernandes 53', 63'	Report	Tomasov 37'; Twumasi 80'; Shomko 90+4'

Estádio José Alvalade, Lisbon
Attendance: 30,456
Referee: Tamás Bognár (Hungary)

Sporting CP won 6–4 on aggregate.

15 February 2018
19:00

Östersunds FK (Sweden)	0–3	(England) Arsenal
	Report	Monreal 13'; Papagiannopoulos 24' (o.g.); Özil 58'

Jämtkraft Arena, Östersund
Attendance: 7,665
Referee: David Fernández Borbalán (Spain)
22 February 2018
21:05

Arsenal (England)	1–2	(Sweden) Östersunds FK
Kolašinac 47'	Report	Aiesh 22'; Sema 23'

Emirates Stadium, London
Attendance: 58,405
Referee: Ivan Kružliak (Slovakia)

Arsenal won 4–2 on aggregate.

15 February 2018
19:00

Marseille (France)	3–0	(Portugal) Braga
Germain 4', 69'; Thauvin 74'	Report

Stade Vélodrome, Marseille
Attendance: 21,731
Referee: Serdar Gözübüyük (Netherlands)
22 February 2018
21:05

Braga (Portugal)	1–0	(France) Marseille
R. Horta 31'	Report

Estádio Municipal, Braga
Attendance: 9,016
Referee: Svein Oddvar Moen (Norway)

Marseille won 3–1 on aggregate.

== Round of 16 ==
The draw for the round of 16 was held on 23 February 2018, 13:00 CET.

=== Summary ===
The first legs were played on 8 March, and the second legs were played on 15 March 2018.

Team 1	Agg.	Team 2	1st leg	2nd leg
Lazio (Italy)	4–2	(Ukraine) Dynamo Kyiv	2–2	2–0
RB Leipzig (Germany)	3–2	(Russia) Zenit Saint Petersburg	2–1	1–1
Atlético Madrid (Spain)	8–1	(Russia) Lokomotiv Moscow	3–0	5–1
CSKA Moscow (Russia)	3–3 (a)	(France) Lyon	0–1	3–2
Marseille (France)	5–2	(Spain) Athletic Bilbao	3–1	2–1
Sporting CP (Portugal)	3–2	(Czech Republic) Viktoria Plzeň	2–0	1–2 (a.e.t.)
Borussia Dortmund (Germany)	1–2	(Austria) Red Bull Salzburg	1–2	0–0
Milan (Italy)	1–5	(England) Arsenal	0–2	1–3

=== Matches ===
8 March 2018
21:05

Lazio (Italy)	2–2	(Ukraine) Dynamo Kyiv
Immobile 54'; Felipe Anderson 62'	Report	Tsyhankov 52'; Júnior Moraes 79'

Stadio Olimpico, Rome
Attendance: 21,562
Referee: Ivan Kružliak (Slovakia)
15 March 2018
19:00

Dynamo Kyiv (Ukraine)	0–2	(Italy) Lazio
	Report	Lucas 23'; De Vrij 83'

NSC Olimpiyskiy Stadium, Kyiv
Attendance: 52,639
Referee: Jesús Gil Manzano (Spain)

Lazio won 4–2 on aggregate.

8 March 2018
21:05

RB Leipzig (Germany)	2–1	(Russia) Zenit Saint Petersburg
Bruma 56'; Werner 77'	Report	Criscito 86'

Red Bull Arena, Leipzig
Attendance: 19,877
Referee: Ovidiu Hațegan (Romania)
15 March 2018
19:00

Zenit Saint Petersburg (Russia)	1–1	(Germany) RB Leipzig
Driussi 45+1'	Report	Augustin 22'

Krestovsky Stadium, Saint Petersburg
Attendance: 44,092
Referee: Daniele Orsato (Italy)

RB Leipzig won 3–2 on aggregate.

8 March 2018
19:00

Atlético Madrid (Spain)	3–0	(Russia) Lokomotiv Moscow
Saúl 22'; Costa 47'; Koke 90'	Report

Wanda Metropolitano, Madrid
Attendance: 40,767
Referee: Jakob Kehlet (Denmark)
15 March 2018
17:00

Lokomotiv Moscow (Russia)	1–5	(Spain) Atlético Madrid
Rybus 20'	Report	Correa 16'; Saúl 47'; Torres 65' (pen.), 70'; Griezmann 85'

RZD Arena, Moscow
Attendance: 22,041
Referee: Artur Soares Dias (Portugal)

Atlético Madrid won 8–1 on aggregate.

8 March 2018
19:00

CSKA Moscow (Russia)	0–1	(France) Lyon
	Report	Marcelo 68'

VEB Arena, Moscow
Attendance: 13,990
Referee: Antonio Mateu Lahoz (Spain)
15 March 2018
21:05

Lyon (France)	2–3	(Russia) CSKA Moscow
Cornet 58'; Mariano 71'	Report	Golovin 39'; Musa 60'; Wernbloom 65'

Parc Olympique Lyonnais, Décines-Charpieu
Attendance: 38,622
Referee: Bobby Madden (Scotland)

3–3 on aggregate; CSKA Moscow won on away goals.

8 March 2018
21:05

Marseille (France)	3–1	(Spain) Athletic Bilbao
Ocampos 1', 57'; Payet 14'	Report	Aduriz 45+3' (pen.)

Stade Vélodrome, Marseille
Attendance: 37,657
Referee: Jorge Sousa (Portugal)
15 March 2018
19:00

Athletic Bilbao (Spain)	1–2	(France) Marseille
Williams 74'	Report	Payet 38' (pen.); Ocampos 52'

San Mamés, Bilbao
Attendance: 40,580
Referee: Anthony Taylor (England)

Marseille won 5–2 on aggregate.

8 March 2018
21:05

Sporting CP (Portugal)	2–0	(Czech Republic) Viktoria Plzeň
Montero 45+1', 49'	Report

Estádio José Alvalade, Lisbon
Attendance: 26,090
Referee: Aleksei Kulbakov (Belarus)
15 March 2018
19:00

Viktoria Plzeň (Czech Republic)	2–1 (a.e.t.)	(Portugal) Sporting CP
Bakoš 6', 65'	Report	Battaglia 105+2'

Doosan Arena, Plzeň
Attendance: 9,370
Referee: Tobias Stieler (Germany)

Sporting CP won 3–2 on aggregate.

8 March 2018
19:00

Borussia Dortmund (Germany)	1–2	(Austria) Red Bull Salzburg
Schürrle 62'	Report	V. Berisha 49' (pen.), 56'

Westfalenstadion, Dortmund
Attendance: 53,700
Referee: Slavko Vinčić (Slovenia)
15 March 2018
21:05

Red Bull Salzburg (Austria)	0–0	(Germany) Borussia Dortmund
	Report

Red Bull Arena, Wals-Siezenheim
Attendance: 29,520
Referee: Benoît Bastien (France)

Red Bull Salzburg won 2–1 on aggregate.

8 March 2018
19:00

Milan (Italy)	0–2	(England) Arsenal
	Report	Mkhitaryan 15'; Ramsey 45+4'

San Siro, Milan
Attendance: 72,821
Referee: Clément Turpin (France)
15 March 2018
21:05

Arsenal (England)	3–1	(Italy) Milan
Welbeck 39' (pen.), 86'; Xhaka 71'	Report	Çalhanoğlu 35'

Emirates Stadium, London
Attendance: 58,973
Referee: Jonas Eriksson (Sweden)

Arsenal won 5–1 on aggregate.

== Quarter-finals ==
The draw for the quarter-finals was held on 16 March 2018, 13:00 CET.

For the first time since the 2004–05 UEFA Cup, all the eight teams at this stage represented different national associations.

=== Summary ===
The first legs were played on 5 April, and the second legs were played on 12 April 2018.

Team 1	Agg.	Team 2	1st leg	2nd leg
RB Leipzig (Germany)	3–5	(France) Marseille	1–0	2–5
Arsenal (England)	6–3	(Russia) CSKA Moscow	4–1	2–2
Atlético Madrid (Spain)	2–1	(Portugal) Sporting CP	2–0	0–1
Lazio (Italy)	5–6	(Austria) Red Bull Salzburg	4–2	1–4

=== Matches ===
5 April 2018
21:05

RB Leipzig (Germany)	1–0	(France) Marseille
Werner 45+1'	Report

Red Bull Arena, Leipzig
Attendance: 34,043
Referee: Alberto Undiano Mallenco (Spain)
12 April 2018
21:05

Marseille (France)	5–2	(Germany) RB Leipzig
Ilsanker 6' (o.g.); Sarr 9'; Thauvin 38'; Payet 60'; Sakai 90+4'	Report	Bruma 2'; Augustin 55'

Stade Vélodrome, Marseille
Attendance: 61,882
Referee: Björn Kuipers (Netherlands)

Marseille won 5–3 on aggregate.

5 April 2018
21:05

Arsenal (England)	4–1	(Russia) CSKA Moscow
Ramsey 9', 28'; Lacazette 23' (pen.), 35'	Report	Golovin 15'

Emirates Stadium, London
Attendance: 58,285
Referee: Pavel Královec (Czech Republic)
12 April 2018
21:05

CSKA Moscow (Russia)	2–2	(England) Arsenal
Chalov 39'; Nababkin 50'	Report	Welbeck 75'; Ramsey 90+2'

VEB Arena, Moscow
Attendance: 29,284
Referee: Felix Zwayer (Germany)

Arsenal won 6–3 on aggregate.

5 April 2018
21:05

Atlético Madrid (Spain)	2–0	(Portugal) Sporting CP
Koke 1'; Griezmann 40'	Report

Wanda Metropolitano, Madrid
Attendance: 53,301
Referee: Sergei Karasev (Russia)
12 April 2018
21:05

Sporting CP (Portugal)	1–0	(Spain) Atlético Madrid
Montero 28'	Report

Estádio José Alvalade, Lisbon
Attendance: 28,437
Referee: Milorad Mažić (Serbia)

Atlético Madrid won 2–1 on aggregate.

5 April 2018
21:05

Lazio (Italy)	4–2	(Austria) Red Bull Salzburg
Lulić 8'; Parolo 49'; Felipe Anderson 74'; Immobile 76'	Report	V. Berisha 30' (pen.); Minamino 71'

Stadio Olimpico, Rome
Attendance: 42,538
Referee: Ovidiu Hațegan (Romania)
12 April 2018
21:05

Red Bull Salzburg (Austria)	4–1	(Italy) Lazio
Dabbur 56'; Haidara 72'; Hwang Hee-chan 74'; Lainer 76'	Report	Immobile 55'

Red Bull Arena, Wals-Siezenheim
Attendance: 29,520
Referee: Damir Skomina (Slovenia)

Red Bull Salzburg won 6–5 on aggregate.

== Semi-finals ==
The draw for the semi-finals was held on 13 April 2018, 12:00 CEST.

=== Summary ===
The first legs were played on 26 April, and the second legs were played on 3 May 2018.

Team 1	Agg.	Team 2	1st leg	2nd leg
Marseille (France)	3–2	(Austria) Red Bull Salzburg	2–0	1–2 (a.e.t.)
Arsenal (England)	1–2	(Spain) Atlético Madrid	1–1	0–1

=== Matches ===
26 April 2018
21:05

Marseille (France)	2–0	(Austria) Red Bull Salzburg
Thauvin 15'; N'Jie 63'	Report

Stade Vélodrome, Marseille
Attendance: 62,312
Referee: Willie Collum (Scotland)
3 May 2018
21:05

Red Bull Salzburg (Austria)	2–1 (a.e.t.)	(France) Marseille
Haidara 53'; Sarr 65' (o.g.)	Report	Rolando 116'

Red Bull Arena, Wals-Siezenheim
Attendance: 29,520
Referee: Sergei Karasev (Russia)

Marseille won 3–2 on aggregate.

26 April 2018
21:05

Arsenal (England)	1–1	(Spain) Atlético Madrid
Lacazette 61'	Report	Griezmann 82'

Emirates Stadium, London
Attendance: 59,066
Referee: Clément Turpin (France)
3 May 2018
21:05

Atlético Madrid (Spain)	1–0	(England) Arsenal
Costa 45+2'	Report

Wanda Metropolitano, Madrid
Attendance: 64,196
Referee: Gianluca Rocchi (Italy)

Atlético Madrid won 2–1 on aggregate.

== Final ==
The final was played at the Parc Olympique Lyonnais in Décines-Charpieu on 16 May 2018. The "home" team (for administrative purposes) was determined by an additional draw held after the semi-final draw.

16 May 2018
20:45

Marseille (France)	0–3	(Spain) Atlético Madrid
	Report	Griezmann 21', 49'; Gabi 89'

Parc Olympique Lyonnais, Décines-Charpieu
Attendance: 55,768
Referee: Björn Kuipers (Netherlands)
