= 2017–18 UEFA Champions League group stage =

International football competition

The 2017–18 UEFA Champions League group stage began on 12 September and ended on 6 December 2017. A total of 32 teams competed in the group stage to decide the 16 places in the knockout phase of the 2017–18 UEFA Champions League.

== Draw ==
The draw for the group stage was held on 24 August 2017, 18:00 CEST, at the Grimaldi Forum in Monaco.

The 32 teams were drawn into eight groups of four, with the restriction that teams from the same association could not be drawn against each other. For the draw, the teams were seeded into four pots based on the following principles:

- Pot 1 contained the title holders and the champions of the top seven associations based on their 2016 UEFA country coefficients. If the title holders were one of the champions of the top seven associations, the champions of the association ranked eighth were also seeded into Pot 1.
- Pot 2, 3 and 4 contained the remaining teams, seeded based on their 2017 UEFA club coefficients.

On 17 July 2014, the UEFA emergency panel ruled that Ukrainian and Russian clubs would not be drawn against each other "until further notice" due to the political unrest between the countries.

Moreover, the draw was controlled for teams from the same association in order to split the teams evenly into the two sets of four groups (A–D, E–H) for maximum television coverage. On each matchday, one set of four groups played their matches on Tuesday, while the other set of four groups played their matches on Wednesday, with the two sets of groups alternating between each matchday.

The fixtures were decided after the draw, using a computer draw not shown to public, with the following match sequence (Regulations Article 16.02):

Matchday	Matches (Note: Positions for scheduling did not use the seeding pots, e.g., Team 1 was not necessarily the team from Pot 1 in the draw.)
Matchday 1	2 v 3, 4 v 1
Matchday 2	1 v 2, 3 v 4
Matchday 3	3 v 1, 2 v 4
Matchday 4	1 v 3, 4 v 2
Matchday 5	3 v 2, 1 v 4
Matchday 6	2 v 1, 4 v 3

There were certain scheduling restrictions: for example, teams from the same city (e.g., Real Madrid and Atlético Madrid) in general were not scheduled to play at home on the same matchday (to avoid teams from the same city playing at home on the same day or on consecutive days, due to logistics and crowd control), and teams in certain countries (e.g., Russia and Azerbaijan) were not scheduled to play at home on the last matchday (due to cold weather and simultaneous kick-off times).

== Teams ==
Below were the participating teams (with their 2017 UEFA club coefficients), grouped by their seeding pot. They included 22 teams which entered in this stage, and the 10 winners of the play-off round (5 in Champions Route, 5 in League Route).

Key to colours
Group winners and runners-up advance to the round of 16
Third-placed teams enter the Europa League round of 32

Pot 1 (by association rank)
Assoc.	Team	Notes	Coeff.
1	(Spain) Real Madrid		176.999
2	(Germany) Bayern Munich		154.899
3	(England) Chelsea		106.192
4	(Italy) Juventus		140.666
5	(Portugal) Benfica		111.866
6	(France) Monaco		62.333
7	(Russia) Spartak Moscow		18.606
8	(Ukraine) Shakhtar Donetsk		87.526

Pot 2
Team	Notes	Coeff.
(Spain) Barcelona		151.999
(Spain) Atlético Madrid		142.999
(France) Paris Saint-Germain		126.333
(Germany) Borussia Dortmund		124.899
(Spain) Sevilla		112.999
(England) Manchester City		100.192
(Portugal) Porto		98.866
(England) Manchester United		95.192

Pot 3
Team	Notes	Coeff.
(Italy) Napoli		88.666
(England) Tottenham Hotspur		77.192
(Switzerland) Basel		74.415
(Greece) Olympiacos		64.580
(Belgium) Anderlecht		58.480
(England) Liverpool		56.192
(Italy) Roma		53.666
(Turkey) Beşiktaş		45.840

Pot 4
Team	Notes	Coeff.
(Scotland) Celtic		42.785
(Russia) CSKA Moscow		39.606
(Portugal) Sporting CP		36.866
(Cyprus) APOEL		26.210
(Netherlands) Feyenoord		23.212
(Slovenia) Maribor		21.125
(Azerbaijan) Qarabağ		18.050
(Germany) RB Leipzig		15.899

Notes

1. ^{TH} Title holders, automatically placed at the top position of seeding list.
2. ^{EL} Europa League title holders, qualified automatically
3. ^{CR} Winners of the play-off round (Champions Route).
4. ^{LR} Winners of the play-off round (League Route).

== Format ==
In each group, teams played against each other home-and-away in a round-robin format. The group winners and runners-up advanced to the round of 16, while the third-placed teams entered the Europa League round of 32.

=== Tiebreakers ===
Teams were ranked according to points (3 points for a win, 1 point for a draw, 0 points for a loss), and if tied on points, the following tiebreaking criteria were applied, in the order given, to determine the rankings (Regulations Articles 17.01):

1. Points in head-to-head matches among tied teams;
2. Goal difference in head-to-head matches among tied teams;
3. Away goals scored in head-to-head matches among tied teams;
4. If more than two teams are tied, and after applying all head-to-head criteria above, a subset of teams are still tied, all head-to-head criteria above are reapplied exclusively to this subset of teams;
5. Goal difference in all group matches;
6. Goals scored in all group matches;
7. Away goals scored in all group matches;
8. Wins in all group matches;
9. Away wins in all group matches;
10. Disciplinary points (red card = 3 points, yellow card = 1 point, expulsion for two yellow cards in one match = 3 points);
11. UEFA club coefficient.

== Groups ==
The matchdays were 12–13 September, 26–27 September, 17–18 October, 31 October – 1 November, 21–22 November, and 5–6 December 2017. The match kickoff times were 20:45 CEST/CET in general, except for certain matches for geographical reasons.

Times are CET/CEST, (Note: CET (UTC+1) for matches in 31 October to 6 December 2017, and CEST (UTC+2) for matches in 12 September to 18 October 2017.) as listed by UEFA (local times, if different, are in parentheses).

=== Group A ===
Pos	Team	Pld	W	D	L	GF	GA	GD	Pts	Qualification	MUN	BSL	CSKA	BEN
1	(England) Manchester United	6	5	0	1	12	3	+9	15	Advance to knockout phase	—	3–0	2–1	2–0
2	(Switzerland) Basel	6	4	0	2	11	5	+6	12	Advance to knockout phase	1–0	—	1–2	5–0
3	(Russia) CSKA Moscow	6	3	0	3	8	10	−2	9	Transfer to Europa League	1–4	0–2	—	2–0
4	(Portugal) Benfica	6	0	0	6	1	14	−13	0		0–1	0–2	1–2	—

Source: UEFA
Rules for classification: Group stage tiebreakers
12 September 2017
20:45 (19:45 UTC+1)

Benfica (Portugal)	1–2	(Russia) CSKA Moscow
Seferovic 50'	Report	Vitinho 63' (pen.); Zhamaletdinov 71'

Estádio da Luz, Lisbon
Attendance: 38,323
Referee: Alberto Undiano Mallenco (Spain)
12 September 2017
20:45 (19:45 UTC+1)

Manchester United (England)	3–0	(Switzerland) Basel
Fellaini 35'; Lukaku 53'; Rashford 84'	Report

Old Trafford, Manchester
Attendance: 73,854
Referee: Ruddy Buquet (France)

27 September 2017
20:45

Basel (Switzerland)	5–0	(Portugal) Benfica
Lang 2'; Oberlin 20', 69'; Van Wolfswinkel 60' (pen.); Riveros 76'	Report

St. Jakob-Park, Basel
Attendance: 34,111
Referee: Craig Thomson (Scotland)
27 September 2017
20:45 (21:45 UTC+3)

CSKA Moscow (Russia)	1–4	(England) Manchester United
Kuchayev 90'	Report	Lukaku 4', 27'; Martial 19' (pen.); Mkhitaryan 57'

VEB Arena, Moscow
Attendance: 29,073
Referee: Jonas Eriksson (Sweden)

18 October 2017
20:45 (21:45 UTC+3)

CSKA Moscow (Russia)	0–2	(Switzerland) Basel
	Report	Xhaka 29'; Oberlin 90'

VEB Arena, Moscow
Attendance: 27,996
Referee: Björn Kuipers (Netherlands)
18 October 2017
20:45 (19:45 UTC+1)

Benfica (Portugal)	0–1	(England) Manchester United
	Report	Rashford 64'

Estádio da Luz, Lisbon
Attendance: 57,684
Referee: Felix Zwayer (Germany)

31 October 2017
20:45

Basel (Switzerland)	1–2	(Russia) CSKA Moscow
Zuffi 32'	Report	Dzagoev 65'; Wernbloom 79'

St. Jakob-Park, Basel
Attendance: 33,303
Referee: Milorad Mažić (Serbia)
31 October 2017
20:45 (19:45 UTC+0)

Manchester United (England)	2–0	(Portugal) Benfica
Svilar 45' (o.g.); Blind 78' (pen.)	Report

Old Trafford, Manchester
Attendance: 74,437
Referee: Gediminas Mažeika (Lithuania)

22 November 2017
18:00 (20:00 UTC+3)

CSKA Moscow (Russia)	2–0	(Portugal) Benfica
Shchennikov 13'; Jardel 56' (o.g.)	Report

VEB Arena, Moscow
Attendance: 27,709
Referee: Deniz Aytekin (Germany)
22 November 2017
20:45

Basel (Switzerland)	1–0	(England) Manchester United
Lang 89'	Report

St. Jakob-Park, Basel
Attendance: 36,000
Referee: Daniele Orsato (Italy)

5 December 2017
20:45 (19:45 UTC+0)

Benfica (Portugal)	0–2	(Switzerland) Basel
	Report	Elyounoussi 5'; Oberlin 65'

Estádio da Luz, Lisbon
Attendance: 22,470
Referee: Jesús Gil Manzano (Spain)
5 December 2017
20:45 (19:45 UTC+0)

Manchester United (England)	2–1	(Russia) CSKA Moscow
Lukaku 64'; Rashford 66'	Report	Vitinho 45'

Old Trafford, Manchester
Attendance: 74,669
Referee: Gianluca Rocchi (Italy)

=== Group B ===
Pos	Team	Pld	W	D	L	GF	GA	GD	Pts	Qualification	PAR	BAY	CEL	AND
1	(France) Paris Saint-Germain	6	5	0	1	25	4	+21	15 (Note: Head-to-head results: Paris Saint-Germain 3–0 Bayern Munich, Bayern Munich 3–1 Paris Saint-Germain.)	Advance to knockout phase	—	3–0	7–1	5–0
2	(Germany) Bayern Munich	6	5	0	1	13	6	+7	15	Advance to knockout phase	3–1	—	3–0	3–0
3	(Scotland) Celtic	6	1	0	5	5	18	−13	3 (Note: Head-to-head results: Anderlecht 0–3 Celtic, Celtic 0–1 Anderlecht.)	Transfer to Europa League	0–5	1–2	—	0–1
4	(Belgium) Anderlecht	6	1	0	5	2	17	−15	3		0–4	1–2	0–3	—

Source: UEFA
Rules for classification: Group stage tiebreakers
Notes:
12 September 2017
20:45

Bayern Munich (Germany)	3–0	(Belgium) Anderlecht
Lewandowski 12' (pen.); Thiago 65'; Kimmich 90'	Report

Allianz Arena, Munich
Attendance: 70,000
Referee: Paolo Tagliavento (Italy)
12 September 2017
20:45 (19:45 UTC+1)

Celtic (Scotland)	0–5	(France) Paris Saint-Germain
	Report	Neymar 19'; Mbappé 34'; Cavani 40' (pen.), 85'; Lustig 83' (o.g.)

Celtic Park, Glasgow
Attendance: 57,562
Referee: Daniele Orsato (Italy)

27 September 2017
20:45

Paris Saint-Germain (France)	3–0	(Germany) Bayern Munich
Dani Alves 2'; Cavani 31'; Neymar 63'	Report

Parc des Princes, Paris
Attendance: 46,252
Referee: Antonio Mateu Lahoz (Spain)
27 September 2017
20:45

Anderlecht (Belgium)	0–3	(Scotland) Celtic
	Report	Griffiths 38'; Roberts 50'; Sinclair 90+3'

Constant Vanden Stock Stadium, Brussels
Attendance: 19,898
Referee: Jesús Gil Manzano (Spain)

18 October 2017
20:45

Anderlecht (Belgium)	0–4	(France) Paris Saint-Germain
	Report	Mbappé 3'; Cavani 44'; Neymar 66'; Di María 88'

Constant Vanden Stock Stadium, Brussels
Attendance: 19,108
Referee: Pavel Královec (Czech Republic)
18 October 2017
20:45

Bayern Munich (Germany)	3–0	(Scotland) Celtic
Müller 17'; Kimmich 29'; Hummels 51'	Report

Allianz Arena, Munich
Attendance: 70,000
Referee: Sergei Karasev (Russia)

31 October 2017
20:45

Paris Saint-Germain (France)	5–0	(Belgium) Anderlecht
Verratti 30'; Neymar 45+4'; Kurzawa 52', 72', 78'	Report

Parc des Princes, Paris
Attendance: 46,403
Referee: David Fernández Borbalán (Spain)
31 October 2017
20:45 (19:45 UTC+0)

Celtic (Scotland)	1–2	(Germany) Bayern Munich
McGregor 74'	Report	Coman 22'; Martínez 77'

Celtic Park, Glasgow
Attendance: 58,269
Referee: Danny Makkelie (Netherlands)

22 November 2017
20:45

Anderlecht (Belgium)	1–2	(Germany) Bayern Munich
Hanni 63'	Report	Lewandowski 51'; Tolisso 77'

Constant Vanden Stock Stadium, Brussels
Attendance: 19,753
Referee: Anthony Taylor (England)
22 November 2017
20:45

Paris Saint-Germain (France)	7–1	(Scotland) Celtic
Neymar 9', 22'; Cavani 28', 79'; Mbappé 35'; Verratti 75'; Dani Alves 80'	Report	Dembélé 1'

Parc des Princes, Paris
Attendance: 46,288
Referee: Anastasios Sidiropoulos (Greece)

5 December 2017
20:45

Bayern Munich (Germany)	3–1	(France) Paris Saint-Germain
Lewandowski 8'; Tolisso 37', 69'	Report	Mbappé 50'

Allianz Arena, Munich
Attendance: 70,000
Referee: Cüneyt Çakır (Turkey)
5 December 2017
20:45 (19:45 UTC+0)

Celtic (Scotland)	0–1	(Belgium) Anderlecht
	Report	Šimunović 62' (o.g.)

Celtic Park, Glasgow
Attendance: 57,931
Referee: Matej Jug (Slovenia)

=== Group C ===
Pos	Team	Pld	W	D	L	GF	GA	GD	Pts	Qualification	ROM	CHE	ATM	QRB
1	(Italy) Roma	6	3	2	1	9	6	+3	11 (Note: Head-to-head results: Chelsea 3–3 Roma, Roma 3–0 Chelsea.)	Advance to knockout phase	—	3–0	0–0	1–0
2	(England) Chelsea	6	3	2	1	16	8	+8	11	Advance to knockout phase	3–3	—	1–1	6–0
3	(Spain) Atlético Madrid	6	1	4	1	5	4	+1	7	Transfer to Europa League	2–0	1–2	—	1–1
4	(Azerbaijan) Qarabağ	6	0	2	4	2	14	−12	2		1–2	0–4	0–0	—

Source: UEFA
Rules for classification: Group stage tiebreakers
Notes:
12 September 2017
20:45 (19:45 UTC+1)

Chelsea (England)	6–0	(Azerbaijan) Qarabağ
Pedro 5'; Zappacosta 30'; Azpilicueta 55'; Bakayoko 71'; Batshuayi 76'; Medvedev 82' (o.g.)	Report

Stamford Bridge, London
Attendance: 41,150
Referee: Anastasios Sidiropoulos (Greece)
12 September 2017
20:45

Roma (Italy)	0–0	(Spain) Atlético Madrid
	Report

Stadio Olimpico, Rome
Attendance: 36,064
Referee: Milorad Mažić (Serbia)

27 September 2017
18:00 (20:00 UTC+4)

Qarabağ (Azerbaijan)	1–2	(Italy) Roma
Pedro Henrique 28'	Report	Manolas 7'; Džeko 15'

Olympic Stadium, Baku (Note: Qarabağ played their home matches at Olympic Stadium, Baku, instead of their regular stadium Azersun Arena, Baku.)
Attendance: 67,200
Referee: Artur Soares Dias (Portugal)
27 September 2017
20:45

Atlético Madrid (Spain)	1–2	(England) Chelsea
Griezmann 40' (pen.)	Report	Morata 60'; Batshuayi 90+3'

Estadio Wanda Metropolitano, Madrid
Attendance: 60,643
Referee: Cüneyt Çakır (Turkey)

18 October 2017
18:00 (20:00 UTC+4)

Qarabağ (Azerbaijan)	0–0	(Spain) Atlético Madrid
	Report

Olympic Stadium, Baku
Attendance: 47,923
Referee: Ruddy Buquet (France)
18 October 2017
20:45 (19:45 UTC+1)

Chelsea (England)	3–3	(Italy) Roma
David Luiz 11'; Hazard 37', 75'	Report	Kolarov 40'; Džeko 64', 70'

Stamford Bridge, London
Attendance: 41,105
Referee: Damir Skomina (Slovenia)

31 October 2017
20:45

Atlético Madrid (Spain)	1–1	(Azerbaijan) Qarabağ
Partey 56'	Report	Míchel 40'

Estadio Wanda Metropolitano, Madrid
Attendance: 55,893
Referee: Deniz Aytekin (Germany)
31 October 2017
20:45

Roma (Italy)	3–0	(England) Chelsea
El Shaarawy 1', 36'; Perotti 63'	Report

Stadio Olimpico, Rome
Attendance: 55,036
Referee: Jonas Eriksson (Sweden)

22 November 2017
18:00 (21:00 UTC+4)

Qarabağ (Azerbaijan)	0–4	(England) Chelsea
	Report	Hazard 21' (pen.); Willian 36', 85'; Fàbregas 73' (pen.)

Olympic Stadium, Baku
Attendance: 67,100
Referee: Jorge Sousa (Portugal)
22 November 2017
20:45

Atlético Madrid (Spain)	2–0	(Italy) Roma
Griezmann 69'; Gameiro 85'	Report

Estadio Wanda Metropolitano, Madrid
Attendance: 56,253
Referee: Björn Kuipers (Netherlands)

5 December 2017
20:45 (19:45 UTC+0)

Chelsea (England)	1–1	(Spain) Atlético Madrid
Savić 75' (o.g.)	Report	Saúl 56'

Stamford Bridge, London
Attendance: 40,875
Referee: Danny Makkelie (Netherlands)
5 December 2017
20:45

Roma (Italy)	1–0	(Azerbaijan) Qarabağ
Perotti 53'	Report

Stadio Olimpico, Rome
Attendance: 34,258
Referee: Tobias Stieler (Germany)

=== Group D ===
Pos	Team	Pld	W	D	L	GF	GA	GD	Pts	Qualification	BAR	JUV	SPO	OLY
1	(Spain) Barcelona	6	4	2	0	9	1	+8	14	Advance to knockout phase	—	3–0	2–0	3–1
2	(Italy) Juventus	6	3	2	1	7	5	+2	11	Advance to knockout phase	0–0	—	2–1	2–0
3	(Portugal) Sporting CP	6	2	1	3	8	9	−1	7	Transfer to Europa League	0–1	1–1	—	3–1
4	(Greece) Olympiacos	6	0	1	5	4	13	−9	1		0–0	0–2	2–3	—

Source: UEFA
Rules for classification: Group stage tiebreakers
12 September 2017
20:45

Barcelona (Spain)	3–0	(Italy) Juventus
Messi 45', 69'; Rakitić 56'	Report

Camp Nou, Barcelona
Attendance: 78,656
Referee: Damir Skomina (Slovenia)
12 September 2017
20:45 (21:45 UTC+3)

Olympiacos (Greece)	2–3	(Portugal) Sporting CP
Pardo 89', 90+3'	Report	Doumbia 2'; Martins 13'; Fernandes 43'

Karaiskakis Stadium, Piraeus
Attendance: 30,168
Referee: Viktor Kassai (Hungary)

27 September 2017
20:45 (19:45 UTC+1)

Sporting CP (Portugal)	0–1	(Spain) Barcelona
	Report	Coates 49' (o.g.)

Estádio José Alvalade, Lisbon
Attendance: 48,575
Referee: Ovidiu Hațegan (Romania)
27 September 2017
20:45

Juventus (Italy)	2–0	(Greece) Olympiacos
Higuaín 69'; Mandžukić 80'	Report

Juventus Stadium, Turin
Attendance: 33,460
Referee: Tobias Stieler (Germany)

18 October 2017
20:45

Juventus (Italy)	2–1	(Portugal) Sporting CP
Pjanić 29'; Mandžukić 84'	Report	Alex Sandro 12' (o.g.)

Juventus Stadium, Turin
Attendance: 36,288
Referee: Michael Oliver (England)
18 October 2017
20:45

Barcelona (Spain)	3–1	(Greece) Olympiacos
Nikolaou 18' (o.g.); Messi 61'; Digne 64'	Report	Nikolaou 90'

Camp Nou, Barcelona
Attendance: 55,026
Referee: Willie Collum (Scotland)

31 October 2017
20:45 (19:45 UTC+0)

Sporting CP (Portugal)	1–1	(Italy) Juventus
Bruno César 20'	Report	Higuaín 79'

Estádio José Alvalade, Lisbon
Attendance: 48,442
Referee: Clément Turpin (France)
31 October 2017
20:45 (21:45 UTC+2)

Olympiacos (Greece)	0–0	(Spain) Barcelona
	Report

Karaiskakis Stadium, Piraeus
Attendance: 31,600
Referee: Anthony Taylor (England)

22 November 2017
20:45

Juventus (Italy)	0–0	(Spain) Barcelona
	Report

Juventus Stadium, Turin
Attendance: 40,876
Referee: Milorad Mažić (Serbia)
22 November 2017
20:45 (19:45 UTC+0)

Sporting CP (Portugal)	3–1	(Greece) Olympiacos
Dost 40', 66'; Bruno César 43'	Report	Odjidja-Ofoe 86'

Estádio José Alvalade, Lisbon
Attendance: 42,528
Referee: Felix Zwayer (Germany)

5 December 2017
20:45

Barcelona (Spain)	2–0	(Portugal) Sporting CP
Alcácer 59'; Mathieu 90+1' (o.g.)	Report

Camp Nou, Barcelona
Attendance: 48,336
Referee: Craig Thomson (Scotland)
5 December 2017
20:45 (21:45 UTC+2)

Olympiacos (Greece)	0–2	(Italy) Juventus
	Report	Cuadrado 15'; Bernardeschi 90'

Karaiskakis Stadium, Piraeus
Attendance: 29,567
Referee: David Fernández Borbalán (Spain)

=== Group E ===
Pos	Team	Pld	W	D	L	GF	GA	GD	Pts	Qualification	LIV	SEV	SPM	MRB
1	(England) Liverpool	6	3	3	0	23	6	+17	12	Advance to knockout phase	—	2–2	7–0	3–0
2	(Spain) Sevilla	6	2	3	1	12	12	0	9	Advance to knockout phase	3–3	—	2–1	3–0
3	(Russia) Spartak Moscow	6	1	3	2	9	13	−4	6	Transfer to Europa League	1–1	5–1	—	1–1
4	(Slovenia) Maribor	6	0	3	3	3	16	−13	3		0–7	1–1	1–1	—

Source: UEFA
Rules for classification: Group stage tiebreakers
13 September 2017
20:45

Maribor (Slovenia)	1–1	(Russia) Spartak Moscow
Bohar 85'	Report	Samedov 59'

Ljudski vrt, Maribor
Attendance: 12,566
Referee: Deniz Aytekin (Germany)
13 September 2017
20:45 (19:45 UTC+1)

Liverpool (England)	2–2	(Spain) Sevilla
Firmino 21'; Salah 37'	Report	Ben Yedder 5'; Correa 72'

Anfield, Liverpool
Attendance: 52,332
Referee: Danny Makkelie (Netherlands)

26 September 2017
20:45

Sevilla (Spain)	3–0	(Slovenia) Maribor
Ben Yedder 27', 38', 83' (pen.)	Report

Estadio Ramón Sánchez Pizjuán, Seville
Attendance: 34,705
Referee: Aleksei Kulbakov (Belarus)
26 September 2017
20:45 (21:45 UTC+3)

Spartak Moscow (Russia)	1–1	(England) Liverpool
Fernando 23'	Report	Coutinho 31'

Otkritie Arena, Moscow
Attendance: 43,376
Referee: Clément Turpin (France)

17 October 2017
20:45 (21:45 UTC+3)

Spartak Moscow (Russia)	5–1	(Spain) Sevilla
Promes 18', 90'; Melgarejo 58'; Glushakov 67'; Luiz Adriano 74'	Report	Kjær 30'

Otkritie Arena, Moscow
Attendance: 44,307
Referee: Gianluca Rocchi (Italy)
17 October 2017
20:45

Maribor (Slovenia)	0–7	(England) Liverpool
	Report	Firmino 4', 54'; Coutinho 13'; Salah 19', 40'; Oxlade-Chamberlain 86'; Alexander-Arnold 90'

Ljudski vrt, Maribor
Attendance: 12,506
Referee: Viktor Kassai (Hungary)

1 November 2017
20:45

Sevilla (Spain)	2–1	(Russia) Spartak Moscow
Lenglet 30'; Banega 59'	Report	Zé Luís 78'

Estadio Ramón Sánchez Pizjuán, Seville
Attendance: 38,002
Referee: Artur Soares Dias (Portugal)
1 November 2017
20:45 (19:45 UTC+0)

Liverpool (England)	3–0	(Slovenia) Maribor
Salah 49'; Can 64'; Sturridge 90'	Report

Anfield, Liverpool
Attendance: 47,957
Referee: Ivan Kružliak (Slovakia)

21 November 2017
18:00 (20:00 UTC+3)

Spartak Moscow (Russia)	1–1	(Slovenia) Maribor
Zé Luís 82'	Report	Mešanović 90+2'

Otkritie Arena, Moscow
Attendance: 42,920
Referee: Willie Collum (Scotland)
21 November 2017
20:45

Sevilla (Spain)	3–3	(England) Liverpool
Ben Yedder 51', 60' (pen.); Pizarro 90+3'	Report	Firmino 2', 30'; Mané 22'

Estadio Ramón Sánchez Pizjuán, Seville
Attendance: 39,495
Referee: Felix Brych (Germany)

6 December 2017
20:45

Maribor (Slovenia)	1–1	(Spain) Sevilla
Tavares 10'	Report	Ganso 75'

Ljudski vrt, Maribor
Attendance: 11,976
Referee: Ovidiu Hațegan (Romania)
6 December 2017
20:45 (19:45 UTC+0)

Liverpool (England)	7–0	(Russia) Spartak Moscow
Coutinho 4' (pen.), 15', 50'; Firmino 19'; Mané 47', 76'; Salah 86'	Report

Anfield, Liverpool
Attendance: 48,779
Referee: Szymon Marciniak (Poland)

=== Group F ===
Pos	Team	Pld	W	D	L	GF	GA	GD	Pts	Qualification	MCI	SHK	NAP	FEY
1	(England) Manchester City	6	5	0	1	14	5	+9	15	Advance to knockout phase	—	2–0	2–1	1–0
2	(Ukraine) Shakhtar Donetsk	6	4	0	2	9	9	0	12	Advance to knockout phase	2–1	—	2–1	3–1
3	(Italy) Napoli	6	2	0	4	11	11	0	6	Transfer to Europa League	2–4	3–0	—	3–1
4	(Netherlands) Feyenoord	6	1	0	5	5	14	−9	3		0–4	1–2	2–1	—

Source: UEFA
Rules for classification: Group stage tiebreakers
13 September 2017
20:45

Feyenoord (Netherlands)	0–4	(England) Manchester City
	Report	Stones 2', 63'; Agüero 10'; Gabriel Jesus 25'

De Kuip, Rotterdam
Attendance: 43,500
Referee: Szymon Marciniak (Poland)
13 September 2017
20:45 (21:45 UTC+3)

Shakhtar Donetsk (Ukraine)	2–1	(Italy) Napoli
Taison 15'; Ferreyra 58'	Report	Milik 72' (pen.)

Metalist Stadium, Kharkiv (Note: Shakhtar Donetsk played their home matches at Metalist Stadium, Kharkiv, instead of their regular stadium, the Donbas Arena in Donetsk, due to the war in Donbas.)
Attendance: 32,679
Referee: Felix Zwayer (Germany)

26 September 2017
20:45

Napoli (Italy)	3–1	(Netherlands) Feyenoord
Insigne 7'; Mertens 49'; Callejón 70'	Report	Amrabat 90+3'

Stadio San Paolo, Naples
Attendance: 22,577
Referee: Willie Collum (Scotland)
26 September 2017
20:45 (19:45 UTC+1)

Manchester City (England)	2–0	(Ukraine) Shakhtar Donetsk
De Bruyne 48'; Sterling 90'	Report

City of Manchester Stadium, Manchester
Attendance: 45,310
Referee: Jorge Sousa (Portugal)

17 October 2017
20:45 (19:45 UTC+1)

Manchester City (England)	2–1	(Italy) Napoli
Sterling 9'; Gabriel Jesus 13'	Report	Diawara 73' (pen.)

City of Manchester Stadium, Manchester
Attendance: 48,520
Referee: Antonio Mateu Lahoz (Spain)
17 October 2017
20:45

Feyenoord (Netherlands)	1–2	(Ukraine) Shakhtar Donetsk
Berghuis 8'	Report	Bernard 24', 54'

De Kuip, Rotterdam
Attendance: 43,500
Referee: Alberto Undiano Mallenco (Spain)

1 November 2017
20:45

Napoli (Italy)	2–4	(England) Manchester City
Insigne 21'; Jorginho 62' (pen.)	Report	Otamendi 34'; Stones 48'; Agüero 69'; Sterling 90+2'

Stadio San Paolo, Naples
Attendance: 44,483
Referee: Felix Brych (Germany)
1 November 2017
20:45 (21:45 UTC+2)

Shakhtar Donetsk (Ukraine)	3–1	(Netherlands) Feyenoord
Ferreyra 14'; Marlos 17', 68'	Report	Jørgensen 12'

Metalist Stadium, Kharkiv
Attendance: 24,570
Referee: Anastasios Sidiropoulos (Greece)

21 November 2017
20:45 (19:45 UTC+0)

Manchester City (England)	1–0	(Netherlands) Feyenoord
Sterling 88'	Report

City of Manchester Stadium, Manchester
Attendance: 43,548
Referee: Ivan Kružliak (Slovakia)
21 November 2017
20:45

Napoli (Italy)	3–0	(Ukraine) Shakhtar Donetsk
Insigne 56'; Zieliński 81'; Mertens 83'	Report

Stadio San Paolo, Naples
Attendance: 10,573
Referee: Damir Skomina (Slovenia)

6 December 2017
20:45

Feyenoord (Netherlands)	2–1	(Italy) Napoli
Jørgensen 33'; St. Juste 90+1'	Report	Zieliński 2'

De Kuip, Rotterdam
Attendance: 36,500
Referee: Michael Oliver (England)
6 December 2017
20:45 (21:45 UTC+2)

Shakhtar Donetsk (Ukraine)	2–1	(England) Manchester City
Bernard 26'; Ismaily 32'	Report	Agüero 90+2' (pen.)

Metalist Stadium, Kharkiv
Attendance: 33,154
Referee: Benoît Bastien (France)

=== Group G ===
Pos	Team	Pld	W	D	L	GF	GA	GD	Pts	Qualification	BES	POR	RBL	MON
1	(Turkey) Beşiktaş	6	4	2	0	11	5	+6	14	Advance to knockout phase	—	1–1	2–0	1–1
2	(Portugal) Porto	6	3	1	2	15	10	+5	10	Advance to knockout phase	1–3	—	3–1	5–2
3	(Germany) RB Leipzig	6	2	1	3	10	11	−1	7	Transfer to Europa League	1–2	3–2	—	1–1
4	(France) Monaco	6	0	2	4	6	16	−10	2		1–2	0–3	1–4	—

Source: UEFA
Rules for classification: Group stage tiebreakers
13 September 2017
20:45

RB Leipzig (Germany)	1–1	(France) Monaco
Forsberg 33'	Report	Tielemans 34'

Red Bull Arena, Leipzig
Attendance: 40,068
Referee: Michael Oliver (England)
13 September 2017
20:45 (19:45 UTC+1)

Porto (Portugal)	1–3	(Turkey) Beşiktaş
Tošić 21' (o.g.)	Report	Talisca 13'; Tosun 28'; Babel 86'

Estádio do Dragão, Porto
Attendance: 42,429
Referee: Anthony Taylor (England)

26 September 2017
20:45 (21:45 UTC+3)

Beşiktaş (Turkey)	2–0	(Germany) RB Leipzig
Babel 11'; Talisca 43'	Report

Vodafone Park, Istanbul
Attendance: 36,641
Referee: Sergei Karasev (Russia)
26 September 2017
20:45

Monaco (France)	0–3	(Portugal) Porto
	Report	Aboubakar 31', 69'; Layún 89'

Stade Louis II, Monaco
Attendance: 11,703
Referee: Slavko Vinčić (Slovenia)

17 October 2017
20:45

Monaco (France)	1–2	(Turkey) Beşiktaş
Falcao 30'	Report	Tosun 34', 54'

Stade Louis II, Monaco
Attendance: 7,403
Referee: Milorad Mažić (Serbia)
17 October 2017
20:45

RB Leipzig (Germany)	3–2	(Portugal) Porto
Orbán 8'; Forsberg 38'; Augustin 41'	Report	Aboubakar 18'; Marcano 44'

Red Bull Arena, Leipzig
Attendance: 41,496
Referee: Paolo Tagliavento (Italy)

1 November 2017
18:00 (20:00 UTC+3)

Beşiktaş (Turkey)	1–1	(France) Monaco
Tosun 54' (pen.)	Report	Lopes 45+1'

Vodafone Park, Istanbul
Attendance: 39,346
Referee: Paolo Tagliavento (Italy)
1 November 2017
20:45 (19:45 UTC+0)

Porto (Portugal)	3–1	(Germany) RB Leipzig
Herrera 13'; D. Pereira 61'; M. Pereira 90+3'	Report	Werner 48'

Estádio do Dragão, Porto
Attendance: 41,616
Referee: Ovidiu Hațegan (Romania)

21 November 2017
18:00 (20:00 UTC+3)

Beşiktaş (Turkey)	1–1	(Portugal) Porto
Talisca 41'	Report	Felipe 29'

Vodafone Park, Istanbul
Attendance: 36,919
Referee: Antonio Mateu Lahoz (Spain)
21 November 2017
20:45

Monaco (France)	1–4	(Germany) RB Leipzig
Falcao 43'	Report	Jemerson 6' (o.g.); Werner 9', 31' (pen.); Keïta 45'

Stade Louis II, Monaco
Attendance: 9,029
Referee: Alberto Undiano Mallenco (Spain)

6 December 2017
20:45

RB Leipzig (Germany)	1–2	(Turkey) Beşiktaş
Keïta 87'	Report	Negredo 10' (pen.); Talisca 90'

Red Bull Arena, Leipzig
Attendance: 42,558
Referee: Viktor Kassai (Hungary)
6 December 2017
20:45 (19:45 UTC+0)

Porto (Portugal)	5–2	(France) Monaco
Aboubakar 9', 33'; Brahimi 45'; Telles 65'; Soares 88'	Report	Glik 61' (pen.); Falcao 78'

Estádio do Dragão, Porto
Attendance: 42,509
Referee: Jonas Eriksson (Sweden)

=== Group H ===
Pos	Team	Pld	W	D	L	GF	GA	GD	Pts	Qualification	TOT	RMA	DOR	APO
1	(England) Tottenham Hotspur	6	5	1	0	15	4	+11	16	Advance to knockout phase	—	3–1	3–1	3–0
2	(Spain) Real Madrid	6	4	1	1	17	7	+10	13	Advance to knockout phase	1–1	—	3–2	3–0
3	(Germany) Borussia Dortmund	6	0	2	4	7	13	−6	2 (Note: Head-to-head results: APOEL 1–1 Borussia Dortmund, Borussia Dortmund 1–1 APOEL (tied on head-to-head results, ranked on total goal difference).)	Transfer to Europa League	1–2	1–3	—	1–1
4	(Cyprus) APOEL	6	0	2	4	2	17	−15	2		0–3	0–6	1–1	—

Source: UEFA
Rules for classification: Group stage tiebreakers
Notes:
13 September 2017
20:45

Real Madrid (Spain)	3–0	(Cyprus) APOEL
Ronaldo 12', 51' (pen.); Ramos 61'	Report

Estadio Santiago Bernabéu, Madrid
Attendance: 71,060
Referee: Benoît Bastien (France)
13 September 2017
20:45 (19:45 UTC+1)

Tottenham Hotspur (England)	3–1	(Germany) Borussia Dortmund
Son Heung-min 4'; Kane 15', 60'	Report	Yarmolenko 11'

Wembley Stadium, London
Attendance: 67,343
Referee: Gianluca Rocchi (Italy)

26 September 2017
20:45

Borussia Dortmund (Germany)	1–3	(Spain) Real Madrid
Aubameyang 54'	Report	Bale 18'; Ronaldo 50', 79'

Westfalenstadion, Dortmund
Attendance: 65,849
Referee: Björn Kuipers (Netherlands)
26 September 2017
20:45 (21:45 UTC+3)

APOEL (Cyprus)	0–3	(England) Tottenham Hotspur
	Report	Kane 39', 62', 67'

GSP Stadium, Nicosia
Attendance: 16,324
Referee: Pavel Královec (Czech Republic)

17 October 2017
20:45 (21:45 UTC+3)

APOEL (Cyprus)	1–1	(Germany) Borussia Dortmund
Poté 62'	Report	Papastathopoulos 67'

GSP Stadium, Nicosia
Attendance: 15,604
Referee: Aleksei Kulbakov (Belarus)
17 October 2017
20:45

Real Madrid (Spain)	1–1	(England) Tottenham Hotspur
Ronaldo 43' (pen.)	Report	Varane 28' (o.g.)

Estadio Santiago Bernabéu, Madrid
Attendance: 76,589
Referee: Szymon Marciniak (Poland)

1 November 2017
20:45

Borussia Dortmund (Germany)	1–1	(Cyprus) APOEL
Guerreiro 29'	Report	Poté 51'

Westfalenstadion, Dortmund
Attendance: 64,500
Referee: Matej Jug (Slovenia)
1 November 2017
20:45 (19:45 UTC+0)

Tottenham Hotspur (England)	3–1	(Spain) Real Madrid
Alli 27', 56'; Eriksen 65'	Report	Ronaldo 80'

Wembley Stadium, London
Attendance: 83,782
Referee: Cüneyt Çakır (Turkey)

21 November 2017
20:45 (21:45 UTC+2)

APOEL (Cyprus)	0–6	(Spain) Real Madrid
	Report	Modrić 23'; Benzema 39', 45+1'; Nacho 41'; Ronaldo 49', 54'

GSP Stadium, Nicosia
Attendance: 19,705
Referee: Artur Soares Dias (Portugal)
21 November 2017
20:45

Borussia Dortmund (Germany)	1–2	(England) Tottenham Hotspur
Aubameyang 31'	Report	Kane 49'; Son Heung-min 76'

Westfalenstadion, Dortmund
Attendance: 65,849
Referee: Clément Turpin (France)

6 December 2017
20:45

Real Madrid (Spain)	3–2	(Germany) Borussia Dortmund
Mayoral 8'; Ronaldo 12'; Vázquez 81'	Report	Aubameyang 43', 49'

Estadio Santiago Bernabéu, Madrid
Attendance: 73,323
Referee: Pavel Královec (Czech Republic)
6 December 2017
20:45 (19:45 UTC+0)

Tottenham Hotspur (England)	3–0	(Cyprus) APOEL
Llorente 20'; Son Heung-min 37'; Nkoudou 80'	Report

Wembley Stadium, London
Attendance: 42,679
Referee: Slavko Vinčić (Slovenia)
