= 2016–17 Liverpool F.C. season =

English football club season

Liverpool
2016–17 season
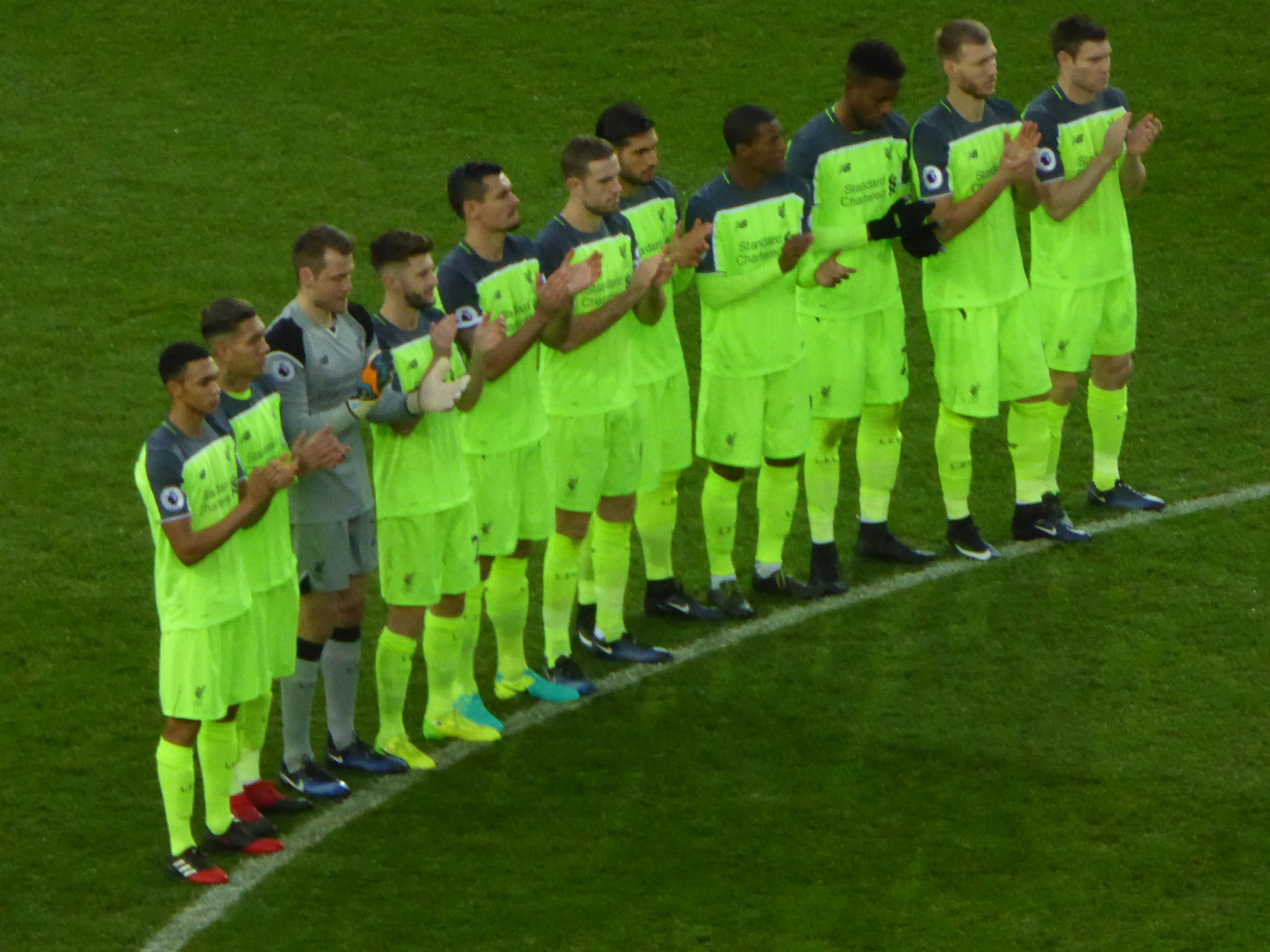
- Liverpool players before Manchester United away, 15 January 2017
- Owner: Fenway Sports Group
- Chairman: Tom Werner
- Manager: Jürgen Klopp
- Stadium: Anfield
- Premier League: 4th
- FA Cup: Fourth round
- EFL Cup: Semi-finals
- Top goalscorer: League: Philippe Coutinho; Sadio Mané (13 each); All: Philippe Coutinho (14)
| Home colours | Away colours | Third colours |

The 2016–17 season was Liverpool Football Club's 125th season in existence and their 55th consecutive season in the top flight of English football. It was also the club's 25th consecutive season in the Premier League. Along with the Premier League, Liverpool also competed in the FA Cup and EFL Cup. The season covered the period from 1 July 2016 to 30 June 2017. It started with a 4–3 away win against Arsenal and ended with a 3–0 home win against relegated Middlesbrough, which secured the Reds a place in the top four and qualification to the UEFA Champions League playoff round.

== Season review ==
=== Pre-season ===
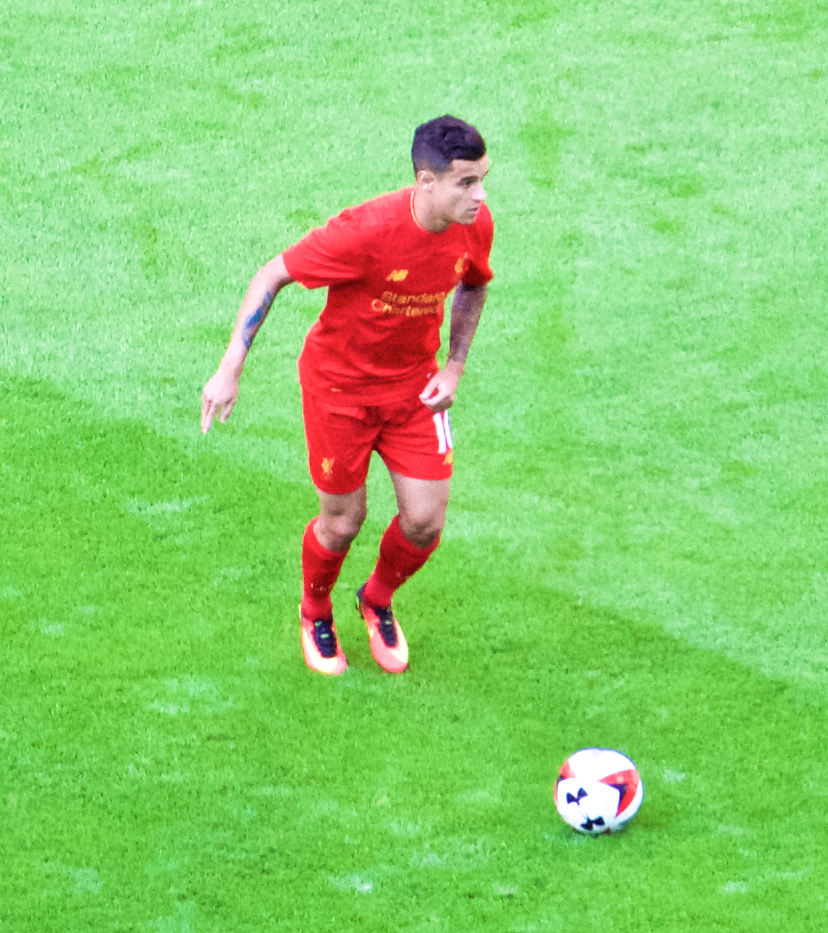
Philippe Coutinho playing against Barcelona in the 2016 International Champions Cup.

Liverpool began their pre-season on 8 July away at Tranmere Rovers. Danny Ings scored the only goal in a 1–0 win. Five days later, the Reds travelled to the Highbury Stadium to face League One side Fleetwood Town. New signing Marko Grujić scored the opening goal on his debut, followed by a goal apiece by Lucas Leiva and 16-year-old debutant Ben Woodburn before two goals by Roberto Firmino rounded out the 5–0 win. Liverpool won their third successive pre-season match on 17 July, with Ings and Woodburn scoring in a 2–0 win over Wigan Athletic. On 20 July, Liverpool defeated Huddersfield Town 2–0 through goals from Alberto Moreno and Grujić; reserve goalkeeper Shamal George also featured in the last 25 minutes of the match as a striker.

Liverpool began their campaign in the International Champions Cup on 28 July, conceding a 0–1 defeat against Chelsea. On 30 July, Liverpool defeated Milan 2–0 with goals from Divock Origi and Firmino. Liverpool then played the final pre-season match in the United States against Roma, suffering a 2–1 defeat. On 6 August, Liverpool played Barcelona at the Wembley Stadium in the final match of the International Champions Cup and won 4–0, with summer signing Sadio Mané getting on the scoresheet along with Origi and Grujić, and former Liverpool player Javier Mascherano scoring an own goal. Liverpool's pre-season ended the following day with a 4–0 defeat at Mainz 05's Opel Arena.

=== August ===
Liverpool began the season with a visit to the Emirates Stadium on 14 August to face-off with Arsenal. Arsenal opened the scoring with a Theo Walcott strike in the 31st minute, one minute after the Arsenal striker saw his penalty kick saved by Liverpool goalkeeper Simon Mignolet, but a free-kick by Philippe Coutinho drew the scoreline level just before the break. The Reds continued the momentum into the second half and were 4–1 up after 63 minutes through strikes from Adam Lallana, Coutinho and Mané. Two quickfire goals from Alex Oxlade-Chamberlain and Calum Chambers in response caused a nervy end to the match, but the Reds were able to see out the 4–3 victory. Liverpool played their second league match away at Burnley on 20 August. Liverpool dominated possession throughout, but was unable to recover from calamitous defending in the first half and suffered a 2–0 defeat. On 23 August, Liverpool began their quest for the EFL Cup in a match against Burton Albion at the Pirelli Stadium. A brace from Daniel Sturridge, an own goal from Tom Naylor and a goal apiece from Firmino and Origi saw a 5–0 win and progression to the next round of the competition. On 27 August, Liverpool played away to Tottenham Hotspur in the Premier League. A James Milner penalty had the Reds 1–0 up at half-time, but a Danny Rose equalizer in the 72nd minute caused the match to end in a 1–1 draw.

=== September ===
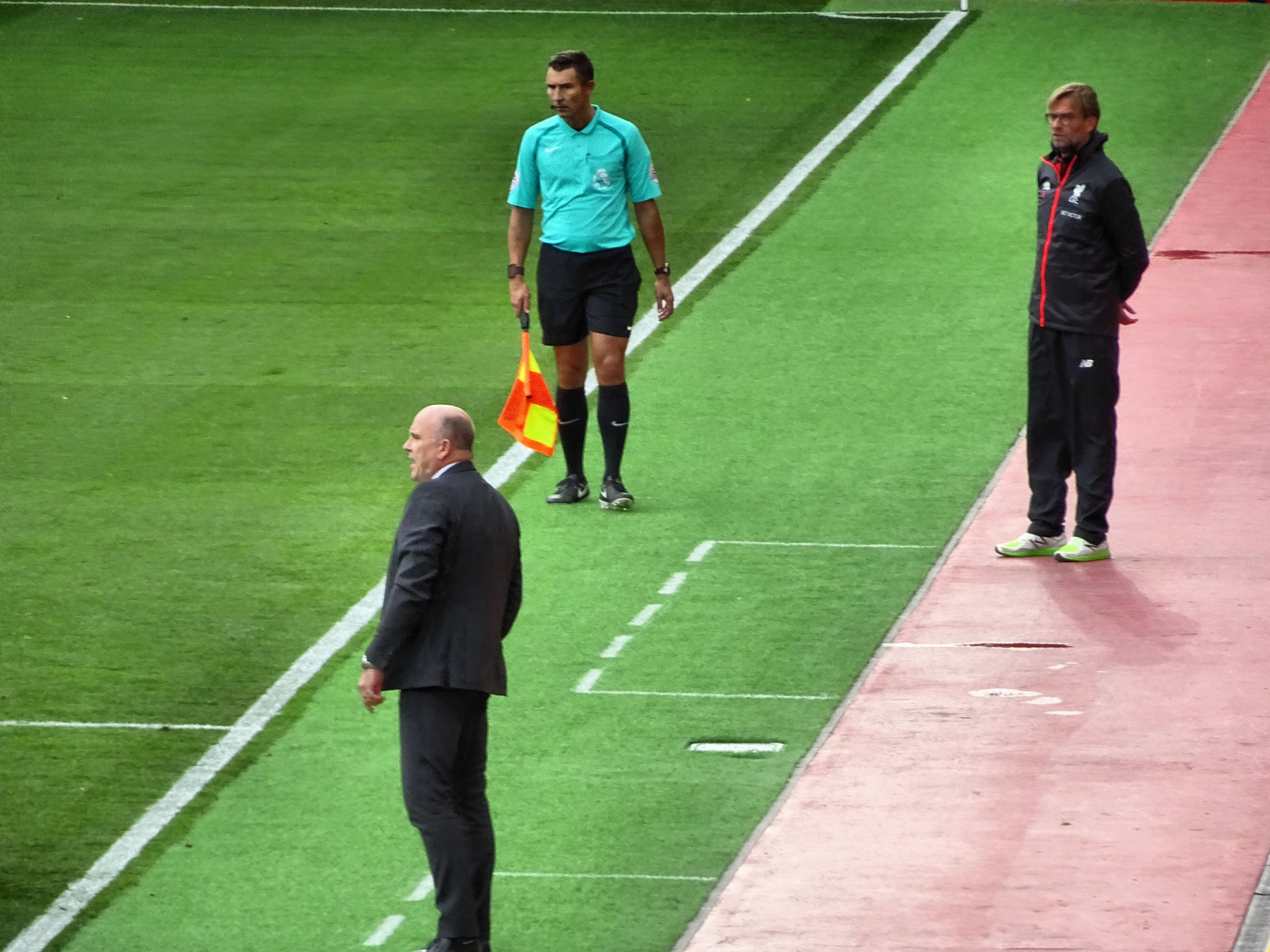
Managers Mike Phelan and Jürgen Klopp in their technical areas at the 5–1 win over Hull City.

On 10 September, after the international break, Liverpool hosted defending champions Leicester City at Anfield. Liverpool were 2–0 up within 30 minutes through goals from Firmino and Mané, but a fumbling of the ball at the back by Lucas Leiva allowed Jamie Vardy to narrow the lead before the break. However, a goal by Lallana in the 56th minute restored the two-goal lead, and Firmino's second goal of the match in the closing stages saw out a 4–1 win. The match was played before Anfield's largest crowd since 1977, with a 54,000 sell-out in the newly expanded stadium. Liverpool then played away at Stamford Bridge against Chelsea on 16 September, winning 2–1. Dejan Lovren's close range finish in the 17th minute and skipper Jordan Henderson's spectacular 25-yard strike in the 36th were enough to secure the 3 points. Liverpool played against Derby County at the Pride Park Stadium in the third round of the EFL Cup on 20 September. They defeated the Rams 3–0 with Ragnar Klavan scoring his first goal for the club, with Coutinho and Origi also getting on the scoresheet. On 24 September, Liverpool made it three wins in a row in the Premier League when they bested Hull City 5–1 at Anfield through strikes from Lallana, Mané, Coutinho and two converted penalties by Milner.

=== October ===
On 1 October, Liverpool defeated Swansea City 2–1 at the Liberty Stadium. A poor first-half saw the Reds down at the break, but a vast improvement in the second half with goals coming from Firmino and a late penalty by Milner were enough to secure the three points. Liverpool faced Manchester United at Anfield on 17 October. The North-West derby was largely forgettable and ended in a 0–0 draw, with Liverpool securing their first clean sheet in the league of the season in a match of few chances. Liverpool then hosted West Bromwich Albion at Anfield on 22 October, winning 2–1. The Reds controlled the game and were 2–0 up at half-time through goals from Mané and Coutinho, but a late Gareth McAuley strike narrowed the scoreline to 2–1. On 25 October, Liverpool played Tottenham Hotspur at Anfield in the fourth round of the EFL Cup. The Reds won 2–1 with a brace from Sturridge seeing them through to the quarter-finals of the competition. Liverpool saw out October with a match against Crystal Palace at Selhurst Park on the 29th. Emre Can, Lovren, Joël Matip and Firmino scored for the Reds in the thrilling encounter which ended 4–2.

=== November ===
Liverpool faced Watford at Anfield on 6 November. The Reds defeated the Hornets 6–1 with Mané bagging a brace, Coutinho, Can and Firmino getting on the scoresheet and Georginio Wijnaldum scoring his first goal for the club. This result put Liverpool top of the Premier League for the first time since April 2014. Following the international break, Liverpool faced Southampton away at St Mary's Stadium on 19 November. The Reds controlled the match but were unable to break down the Saints' defence as the match ended 0–0. On 26 November, Liverpool hosted Sunderland at Anfield. Origi made the breakthrough for the Reds in the 75th minute and Milner converted a penalty in the closing stages of the match to see out a 2–0 victory. Ben Woodburn made his debut for Liverpool when he came on as a substitute for Wijnaldum in the 92nd minute. Three days later, on 29 November, Liverpool hosted Leeds United at Anfield in the fifth round of the EFL Cup. Origi opened the scoring in the 76th minute and Woodburn's volley in the box in the 81st saw out a 2–0 victory and progression to the semi-finals of the competition. Woodburn's goal at the age of 17 years and 45 days old made him Liverpool's youngest ever goalscorer, surpassing Michael Owen's record by 99 days.

=== December ===
Liverpool faced AFC Bournemouth at Dean Court on 4 December. Mané and Origi scored one apiece in the first half and Can scored another in the second half to see the Reds to a 3–1 lead, but three goals from Bournemouth in the final 20 minutes of the match caused Liverpool to suffer a 3–4 defeat. Liverpool then faced West Ham United at Anfield on 11 December, drawing 2–2. On 14 December, Liverpool travelled to the Riverside Stadium to face Middlesbrough. Lallana bagged a brace and created another for Origi to see the Reds to a 3–0 victory. Next up was Everton, the Merseyside Derby, on 19 December. Mané scored the winning and only goal in the 94th minute. Liverpool then faced Stoke City. Stoke rapidly opened the score in the 12th minute, but an equaliser from Lallana and a goal from Firmino made the Reds lead at half-time. In the second half, an own goal by Giannelli Imbula and a goal from Sturridge ensured a 4–1 Reds win. On 31 December, Liverpool hosted Manchester City, with the Reds winning 1–0 thanks to a header by Wijnaldum in the eighth minute.

=== January ===
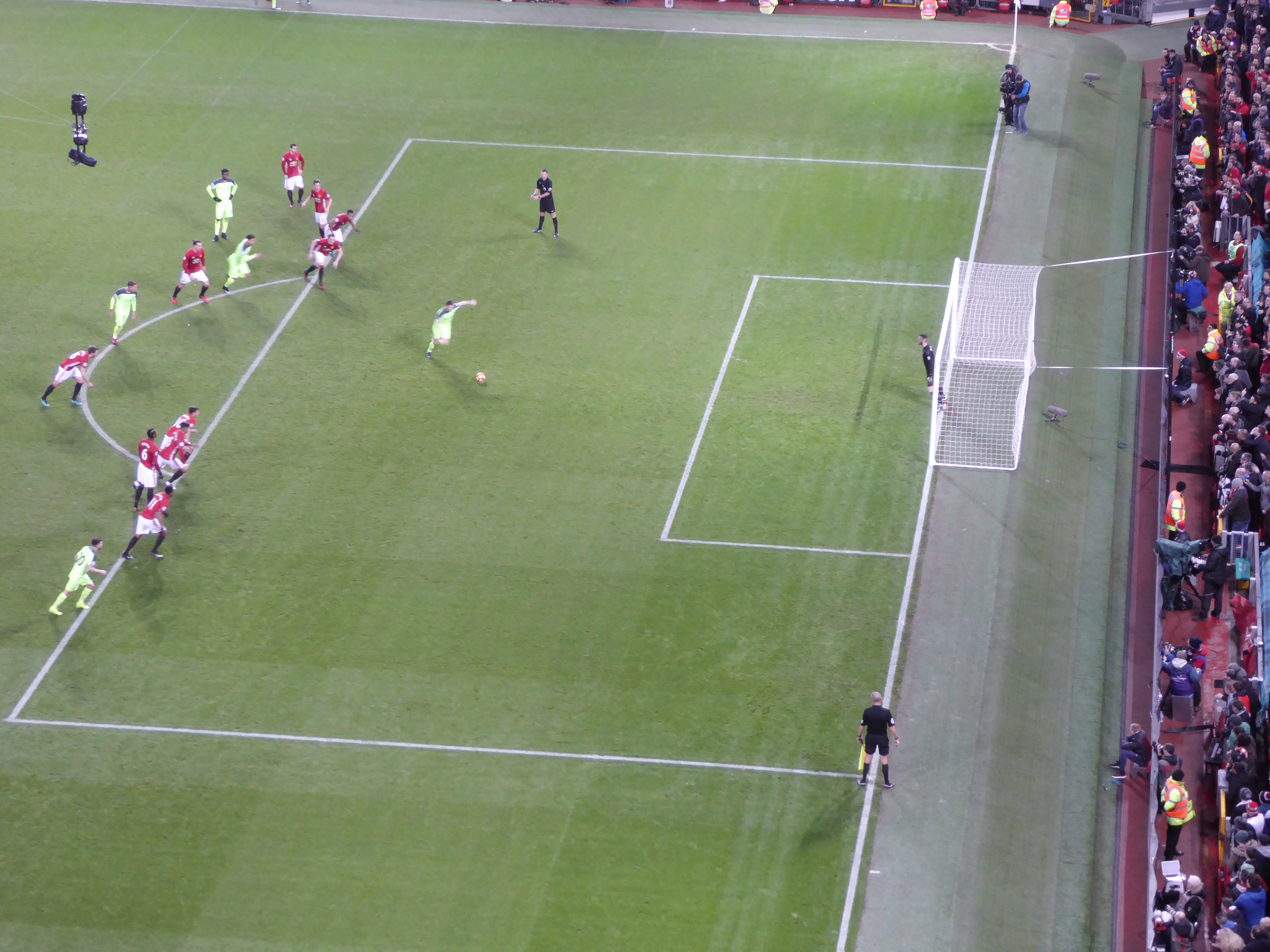
James Milner scores a penalty kick to give Liverpool the lead at Old Trafford; the final score was 1–1.

Liverpool went to play Sunderland, where Sturridge opened the scoring with a header, but minutes later Jermain Defoe levelled it from the spot so that it would go 1–1 at half-time. Mané scored another for 2–1 in the 71st minute, but ten minutes later, he handled the ball in the penalty area with the referee pointing to the spot. Defoe scored once again and the match ended level, with the reds missing out important points. On 8 January, Liverpool played a goalless draw against Plymouth Argyle in the third round of the FA Cup. The match was marked with the Reds fielding the youngest starting 11 in their history. Liverpool then faced Southampton, on 11 January, in the EFL Cup semi-finals first leg at St Mary's, losing the game 1–0 with Redmond scoring the only goal in 20th minute. Three days later, the Reds faced Manchester United at Old Trafford. Milner opened the scoring from the spot in the 26th minute, after Paul Pogba handled the ball in the box. In the 84th minute, Zlatan Ibrahimović levelled the match 1–1. Liverpool were up to play the replay with Plymouth on the 18th. A goal by Lucas Leiva in the 17th minute made them earn their first and last win in January. Later in this month, Liverpool hosted Swansea City in the Premier League. Early in the second half, two fast goals by Fernando Llorente gave Swansea the commanding position. However, Liverpool levelled through Firmino in the 54th and 69th minute. Gylfi Sigurðsson finished a shot in the back of the net for 2–3. On 25 January, Liverpool hosted Southampton in the second leg of the EFL Cup semi-final. They dominated the match, made some good chances, including a shot by Can cleared off the line by Southampton goalkeeper Fraser Forster. At the stoppage time, Shane Long sealed the win for the Saints with a goal to make the aggregate score 2–0. The bad month for Liverpool continued, as they were eliminated from the FA Cup after a 1–2 home loss to Wolverhampton Wanderers. The Reds ended the month with a 1–1 home draw to Chelsea in the Premier League, where David Luiz opened the scoring with a free-kick, just to leave it for Wijnaldum to level in the 58th. Diego Costa saw his penalty shot stopped by Mignolet in the 78th minute.

=== February ===
Liverpool started February with a 2–0 loss away to Hull City, which was Mane's first game after Senegal lost in the quarter-finals of the 2017 Africa Cup of Nations. The goals for Hull came from Alfred N'Diaye just before the break and Oumar Niasse in the 84th minute. One week later, the Reds won for the first time since five matches in the Premier League, with two Mané goals in two minutes sealing the 2–0 win for the Merseyside team against Spurs. On 27 February, Liverpool lost 3–1 away to Leicester in the first match for their new manager Craig Shakespeare following the sacking of the title-winning Claudio Ranieri. Jamie Vardy opened the scoring with Danny Drinkwater making it two before the break. Early in the second half, Vardy scored his second goal of the night to see his team leading 3–0, and Coutinho made the final result in the 69th minute.

=== March ===
On 4 March, Liverpool continued their winning ways against fellow top six teams with a 3–1 home victory over Arsenal. The Reds were 2–0 up at the break with goals from Firmino in the ninth minute and Mané in the 40th, but Danny Welbeck halved the Liverpool lead with a goal in the 57th minute. In the stoppage time, Wijnaldum sealed the match off, making it 3–1 following a low cross by Origi from the right. Liverpool then went on to win a vital three points home against Burnley on 12 March, winning 2–1. After falling down to an Ashley Barnes strike early in the match, Wijnaldum equalized in the stoppage time of the first half just seconds before the half's end, and in the 64th minute, Can gave Liverpool the lead with a long-range shot that ended up out of the grasp of goalkeeper Tom Heaton. On 19 March, Liverpool traveled to Manchester City for a crucial game in the battle for Champions League qualification. Milner opened the scoring from the spot in the 51st minute, though Sergio Agüero leveled at the 69th. Both sides missed many chances, including a mishit by Lallana from five yards, but by the end, the draw was considered a fair result.

=== April ===
Liverpool started their month on 1 April against Everton in the Merseyside Derby at Anfield. Mané put Liverpool ahead, but Matthew Pennington drew Everton level in the 28th minute. The host Reds regained the lead two minutes and 57 seconds later with a strike from Coutinho. Origi, a substitute for the injured Mané, added a third goal just minutes after being introduced and the scoreline remained 3–1 till the final whistle. The second fixture was on 5 April against AFC Bournemouth at Anfield. Benik Afobe scored early for the visiting Cherries off a back-pass mishap from Wijnaldum. However, Coutinho drew the match level at 1–1 with a goal in the 40th minute. The Reds struck first in the second half with a goal from Origi, assisted by Wijnaldum, in the 59th. Bournemouth was able to draw the game level through a late Joshua King goal putting the score at 2–2, which the match finished. The day before their upcoming fixture, an away match at Stoke City, Klopp confirmed Mané would ruled out for the remainder of Liverpool's season. Liverpool had no time to dwell upon this as Stoke awaited the following day. With a side featuring youth players such as Trent Alexander-Arnold and Woodburn, Liverpool fell behind 1–0 at the half following a Jonathan Walters goal just before the break. However, the introduction of Firmino and Coutinho at half-time led to responses in the 70th and 72nd minutes, where Coutinho then Firmino respectively scored to put the scoreline at 1–2. The Reds saw the match out, marking their first away victory of the calendar year in the Premier League. Liverpool's April continued with a match at West Brom, where the sole goal came from Firmino off a set piece header in first-half injury time. The final fixture of the month was a return to Anfield to square-off with Crystal Palace. Coutinho opened the scoring in the 24th minute off a free-kick, however former Liverpool man Christian Benteke leveled the match then scored a second in the 74th to hand Liverpool a 1–2 loss, just their second Premier League home defeat of the season.

=== May ===
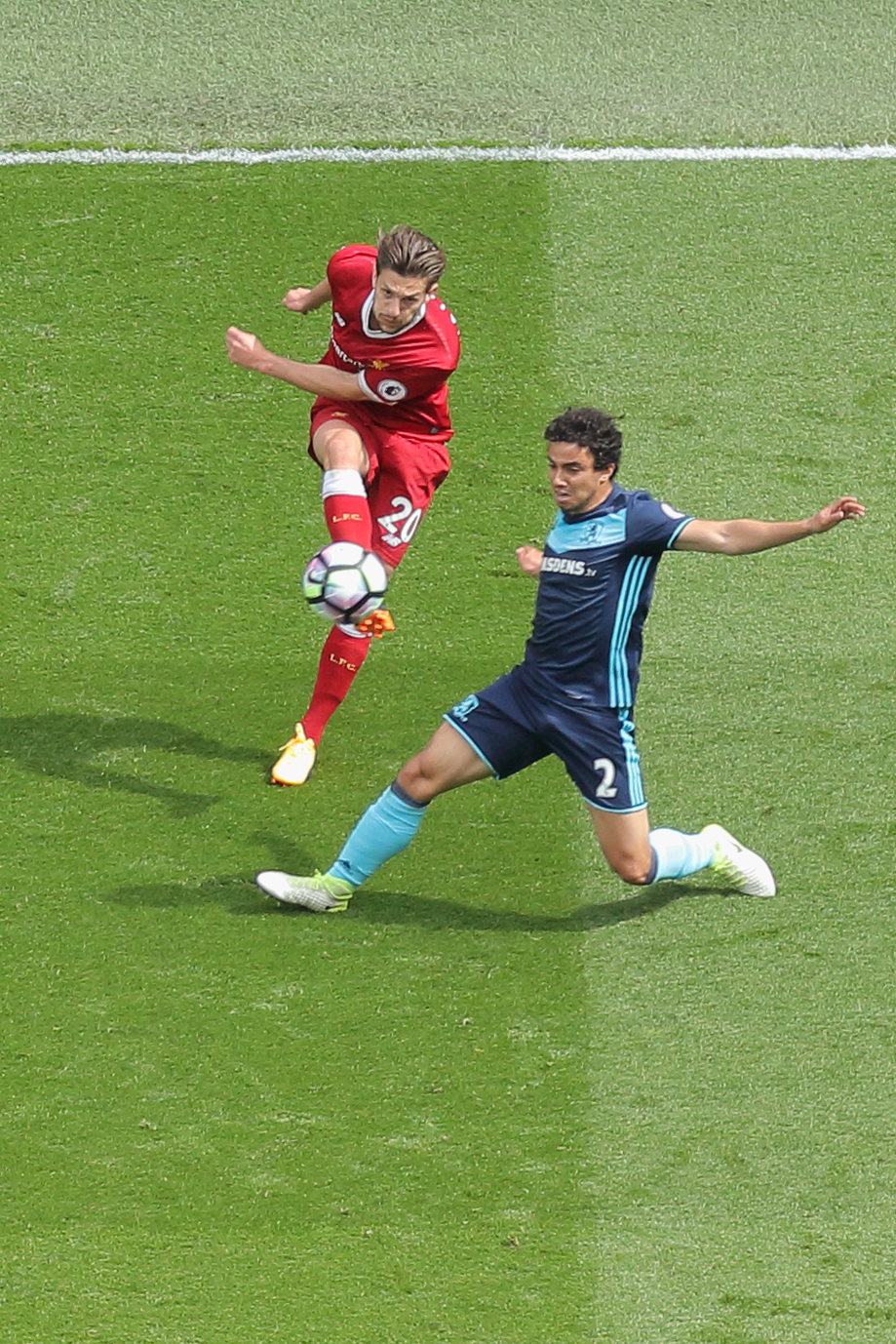
Adam Lallana tries to escape the attentions of Middlesbrough full-back Fábio on the final day of the season.

The final month of the season for Liverpool began on 7 May with a home match against Southampton. The result was a 0–0 draw, with the best chance coming to the Reds through a 66th-minute penalty that was taken by Milner and ultimately missed. The kick came just moments after Southampton goalkeeper Fraser Forster approached Milner as he put the ball on the spot seemingly in an attempt to win a psychological advantage before the penalty. This draw resulted in the fourth match against Southampton out of four played in this season where Liverpool failed to score. The penultimate match of the season (and final away match) was on 14 May, a visit at Olympic Stadium to face West Ham. The Reds struck first in the 35th minute thanks to Sturridge's finish following what was described as a "sublime" pass from Coutinho. In the second half, Coutinho scored twice in four minutes and Origi's goal in the 76th minute capped off a 0–4 victory.

The final match of the season took place on 21 May, at Anfield against Middlesbrough. While Middlesbrough were already guaranteed relegation and a Premier League finish of 19th, Liverpool sat in fourth place at the time of kick-off, with Arsenal just one point behind and Manchester City two points ahead, with a win guaranteeing Liverpool a spot in the UEFA Champions League for next season. The match stayed at 0–0 for the first 45 minutes, however Wijnaldum found a breakthrough for the Reds in first-half stoppage time, putting Liverpool up 1–0 at the half. Coutinho added a second just six minutes into the second half and that goal was followed by a third from Lallana just five minutes after that putting Liverpool up 3–0, where the scoreline would remain. Liverpool clinched fourth place in the final Premier League table to secure Champions League football for the 2017–18 season.

== First team ==
| Squad No. | Name | Nationality | Position(s) | Date of birth | Signed from | Apps | Goals | Assists |
Goalkeepers
| 1 | Loris Karius | (Germany) | GK | 22 June 1993 (aged 24) | (Germany) Mainz 05 | 16 | 0 | 0 |
| 13 | Alex Manninger | (Austria) | GK | 4 June 1977 (aged 40) | (Germany) FC Augsburg | 0 | 0 | 0 |
| 22 | Simon Mignolet | (Belgium) | GK | 6 March 1988 (aged 29) | (England) Sunderland | 180 | 0 | 0 |
| 34 | Ádám Bogdán | (Hungary) | GK | 27 September 1987 (aged 29) | (England) Bolton Wanderers | 6 | 0 | 0 |
Defenders
| 2 | Nathaniel Clyne | (England) | RB | 5 April 1991 (aged 26) | (England) Southampton | 93 | 2 | 4 |
| 6 | Dejan Lovren | (Croatia) | CB | 5 July 1989 (aged 27) | (England) Southampton | 109 | 4 | 1 |
| 12 | Joe Gomez | (England) | RB/LB/CB | 23 May 1997 (aged 20) | (England) Charlton Athletic | 10 | 0 | 1 |
| 17 | Ragnar Klavan | (Estonia) | CB | 30 October 1985 (aged 31) | (Germany) FC Augsburg | 25 | 1 | 0 |
| 18 | Alberto Moreno | (Spain) | LB | 5 July 1992 (aged 24) | (Spain) Sevilla | 109 | 3 | 8 |
| 32 | Joël Matip | (Cameroon) | CB | 8 August 1991 (aged 25) | (Germany) Schalke 04 | 32 | 1 | 0 |
| 56 | Connor Randall | (England) | RB | 21 October 1995 (aged 21) | (England) LFC Academy | 8 | 0 | 0 |
| 66 | Trent Alexander-Arnold | (England) | RB | 7 October 1998 (aged 18) | (England) LFC Academy | 12 | 0 | 1 |
Midfielders
| 5 | Georginio Wijnaldum | (Netherlands) | CM/AM | 11 November 1990 (aged 26) | (England) Newcastle United | 42 | 6 | 11 |
| 7 | James Milner (vice-captain) | (England) | DM/CM/LB/RB | 4 January 1986 (aged 31) | (England) Manchester City | 85 | 14 | 18 |
| 10 | Philippe Coutinho | (Brazil) | AM/LW | 12 June 1992 (aged 25) | (Italy) Inter Milan | 181 | 42 | 35 |
| 14 | Jordan Henderson (captain) | (England) | CM/DM | 17 June 1990 (aged 27) | (England) Sunderland | 239 | 23 | 36 |
| 16 | Marko Grujić | (Serbia) | CM | 13 April 1996 (aged 21) | (Serbia) Red Star | 8 | 0 | 1 |
| 20 | Adam Lallana | (England) | CM/AM/RW/LW | 10 May 1988 (aged 29) | (England) Southampton | 125 | 21 | 19 |
| 21 | Lucas Leiva (3rd captain) | (Brazil) | DM/CB | 9 January 1987 (aged 30) | (Brazil) Grêmio | 346 | 7 | 19 |
| 23 | Emre Can | (Germany) | DM/CM | 12 January 1994 (aged 23) | (Germany) Bayer Leverkusen | 129 | 8 | 6 |
| 35 | Kevin Stewart | (England) | DM | 7 September 1993 (aged 23) | (England) Tottenham Hotspur | 20 | 0 | 0 |
| 53 | Ovie Ejaria | (England) | CM/AM | 18 November 1997 (aged 19) | (England) Arsenal | 8 | 0 | 0 |
| 54 | Sheyi Ojo | (England) | RW/LW | 19 June 1997 (aged 20) | (England) LFC Academy | 13 | 1 | 4 |
Forwards
| 11 | Roberto Firmino | (Brazil) | FW/AM/LW | 2 October 1991 (aged 25) | (Germany) Hoffenheim | 90 | 23 | 17 |
| 15 | Daniel Sturridge | (England) | FW | 1 September 1989 (aged 27) | (England) Chelsea | 119 | 60 | 15 |
| 19 | Sadio Mané | (Senegal) | RW/LW | 10 April 1992 (aged 25) | (England) Southampton | 29 | 13 | 7 |
| 27 | Divock Origi | (Belgium) | FW | 18 April 1995 (aged 22) | (France) Lille | 76 | 21 | 6 |
| 28 | Danny Ings | (England) | FW | 23 July 1992 (aged 24) | (England) Burnley | 11 | 3 | 0 |
| 58 | Ben Woodburn | (Wales) | FW/RW/LW | 15 October 1999 (aged 17) | (England) LFC Academy | 9 | 1 | 0 |

=== New contracts ===
| Date | Pos | No. | Player | Ref. |
|---|---|---|---|---|
| 11 July 2016 | GK | 52 | (Wales) Danny Ward | |
| 25 January 2017 | MF | 10 | (Brazil) Philippe Coutinho | |
| 27 January 2017 | DF | 12 | (England) Joe Gomez | |
| 22 February 2017 | MF | 20 | (England) Adam Lallana | |
| 28 April 2017 | DF | 6 | (Croatia) Dejan Lovren | |

== Transfers and loans ==
=== Transfers in ===
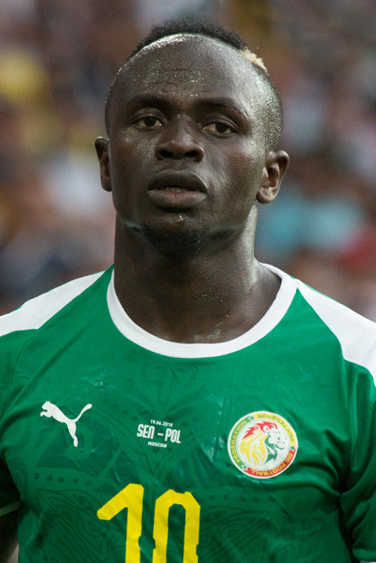
£30m was spent signing Southampton's Senegal striker Sadio Mané.

| Entry date | Position | No. | Player | From club | Fee | Ref. |
|---|---|---|---|---|---|---|
| 1 July 2016 | DF | 32 | (Cameroon) Joël Matip | (Germany) Schalke 04 | Free | |
| 1 July 2016 | GK | 1 | (Germany) Loris Karius | (Germany) Mainz 05 | £4,700,000 | |
| 1 July 2016 | FW | 19 | (Senegal) Sadio Mané | (England) Southampton | £36,000,000 | |
| 20 July 2016 | DF | 17 | (Estonia) Ragnar Klavan | (Germany) FC Augsburg | £4,200,000 | |
| 22 July 2016 | GK | 13 | (Austria) Alex Manninger | (Germany) FC Augsburg | Free | |
| 22 July 2016 | MF | 5 | (Netherlands) Georginio Wijnaldum | (England) Newcastle United | £23,000,000 (Note: Fee may eventually rise to £25,000,000.) | |
| Total | | | | | £67,900,000 | |

=== Transfers out ===
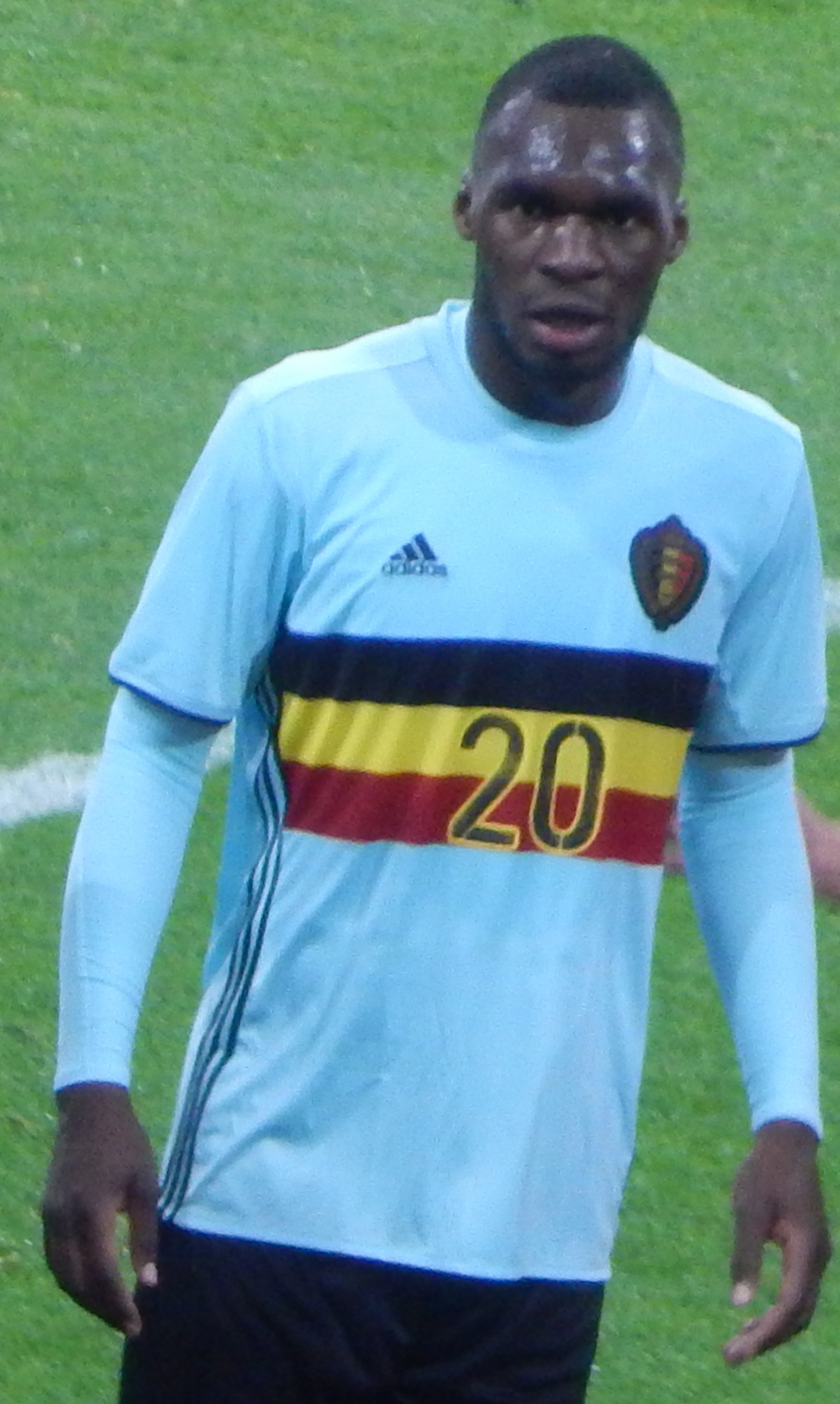
Liverpool's largest reported transfer fee in was the £27m paid by Crystal Palace for Christian Benteke.

| Exit date | Position | No. | Player | To club | Fee | Ref. |
|---|---|---|---|---|---|---|
| 1 July 2016 | MF | 46 | (England) Jordan Rossiter | (Scotland) Rangers | £250,000 | |
| 1 July 2016 | DF | 3 | (Spain) José Enrique | (Spain) Real Zaragoza | Released | |
| 1 July 2016 | DF | 4 | (Ivory Coast) Kolo Touré | (Scotland) Celtic | Released | |
| 1 July 2016 | FW | 39 | (Germany) Samed Yeşil | (Greece) Panionios | Released | |
| 1 July 2016 | MF | 53 | (Portugal) João Carlos Teixeira | (Portugal) Porto | £250,000 | |
| 1 July 2016 | FW | 48 | (England) Jerome Sinclair | (England) Watford | £4,000,000 | |
| 13 July 2016 | MF | 64 | (Spain) Sergi Canós | (England) Norwich City | £2,500,000 (Note: Fee may eventually rise to £4,000,000.) | |
| 14 July 2016 | DF | 37 | (Slovakia) Martin Škrtel | (Turkey) Fenerbahçe | £5,500,000 | |
| 14 July 2016 | MF | 33 | (England) Jordon Ibe | (England) AFC Bournemouth | £15,000,000 | |
| 25 July 2016 | MF | 24 | (Wales) Joe Allen | (England) Stoke City | £11,000,000 (Note: Fee may eventually rise to £13,000,000.) | |
| 27 July 2016 | DF | 44 | (Australia) Brad Smith | (England) AFC Bournemouth | £3,000,000 (Note: Fee may eventually rise to £6,000,000.) | |
| 20 August 2016 | FW | 9 | (Belgium) Christian Benteke | (England) Crystal Palace | £27,000,000 (Note: Fee may eventually rise to £32,000,000.) | |
| 31 August 2016 | MF | — | (Spain) Luis Alberto | (Italy) Lazio | £4,300,000 (Note: Fee may eventually rise to £6,000,000.) | |
| 31 August 2016 | FW | 45 | (Italy) Mario Balotelli | (France) Nice | Free | |
| 13 January 2017 | DF | 57 | (England) Joe Maguire | (England) Fleetwood Town | Undisclosed | |
| 18 January 2017 | DF | 26 | (Portugal) Tiago Ilori | (England) Reading | £3,750,000 | |
| Total | | | | | £76,550,000 | |

=== Loans out ===
| Start date | End date | Position | No. | Player | To club | Fee | Ref. |
|---|---|---|---|---|---|---|---|
| 10 July 2016 | End of season | GK | 39 | (Scotland) Ryan Fulton | (England) Chesterfield | None | |
| 11 July 2016 | End of season | GK | 52 | (Wales) Danny Ward | (England) Huddersfield Town | None | |
| 20 July 2016 | End of season | GK | 34 | (Hungary) Ádám Bogdán | (England) Wigan Athletic | None | |
| 26 July 2016 | End of season | MF | 40 | (England) Ryan Kent | (England) Barnsley | None | |
| 5 August 2016 | End of season | DF | 38 | (England) Jon Flanagan | (England) Burnley | None | |
| 5 August 2016 | End of season | AM | — | (Brazil) Allan | (Germany) Hertha BSC | None | |
| 26 August 2016 | End of season | ST | — | (Nigeria) Taiwo Awoniyi | (Netherlands) NEC | None | |
| 31 August 2016 | End of season | DF | 47 | (England) Andre Wisdom | (Austria) Red Bull Salzburg | None | |
| 31 August 2016 | 23 January 2017 (Note: On 23 January 2017, Lazar Marković's season-long loan at Sporting CP was terminated.) | RW | 50 | (Serbia) Lazar Marković | (Portugal) Sporting CP | None | |
| 6 January 2017 | End of season | DM | 68 | (Spain) Pedro Chirivella | (Netherlands) Go Ahead Eagles | None | |
| 23 January 2017 | End of season | RW | 50 | (Serbia) Lazar Marković | (England) Hull City | None | |
| 27 January 2017 | End of season | CM | 25 | (England) Cameron Brannagan | (England) Fleetwood Town | None | |
| 31 January 2017 | End of season | ST | 41 | (England) Jack Dunn | (England) Tranmere Rovers | None | |
| 1 February 2017 | End of season | CB | 3 | (France) Mamadou Sakho | (England) Crystal Palace | £2,000,000 | |

=== Transfer summary ===
Spending

Summer: ▼£ 67,900,000

Winter: £ 0

Total: ▼£ 67,900,000

Income

Summer: ▲£ 72,800,000

Winter: ▲£ 5,750,000

Total: ▲£ 78,550,000

Net Expenditure

Summer: ▲£ 4,900,000

Winter: ▲£ 5,750,000

Total: ▲£ 10,650,000

== Friendlies ==
=== Pre-season ===
| 8 July 2016 Friendly | Tranmere Rovers | 0–1 | Liverpool | Birkenhead, England |
| 19:00 BST | | Report | Ings 78' | Stadium: Prenton Park; Attendance: 13,000 |

| 13 July 2016 Friendly | Fleetwood Town | 0–5 | Liverpool | Fleetwood, England |
| 19:00 BST | | Report | Grujić 18'; Woodburn 52'; Lucas 69'; Firmino 70', 90+1' | Stadium: Highbury Stadium; Attendance: 5,254 |

| 17 July 2016 Friendly | Wigan Athletic | 0–2 | Liverpool | Wigan, England |
| 16:00 BST | | Report | Ings 71'; Woodburn 74' | Stadium: DW Stadium; Attendance: 18,000 |

| 20 July 2016 Friendly | Huddersfield Town | 0–2 | Liverpool | Huddersfield, England |
| 19:45 BST | | Report | Grujić 32'; Moreno 90' (pen.) | Stadium: John Smith's Stadium; Attendance: 21,266 |

| 2 August 2016 Friendly | Liverpool | 1–2 | Roma | St. Louis, MO, United States |
| 01:35 BST | Ojo 45+1' | Report | Džeko 30'; Salah 62' | Stadium: Busch Stadium; Attendance: 28,573 |

| 7 August 2016 Friendly | Mainz 05 | 4–0 | Liverpool | Mainz, Germany |
| 14:45 BST | Brosinski 15' (pen.); Córdoba 45'; Mallı 59'; Muto 74' | Report | | Stadium: Coface Arena; Referee: 31,600 |

==== International Champions Cup ====
| 28 July 2016 Friendly | Chelsea | 1–0 | Liverpool | Pasadena, CA, United States |
| 04:35 BST | Cahill 10' | Report | | Stadium: Rose Bowl; Attendance: 53,117; Referee: Baldomero Toledo (United States) |

| 31 July 2016 Friendly | Liverpool | 2–0 | Milan | Santa Clara, CA, United States |
| 03:05 BST | Lallana (yellow card) 40'; Origi 59'; Firmino 73' | Report | | Stadium: Levi's Stadium; Attendance: 30,758; Referee: Kevin Stott (United States) |

| 6 August 2016 Friendly | Liverpool | 4–0 | Barcelona | London, England |
| 17:15 BST | Mané 15'; Mascherano 47' (o.g.); Origi 48'; Grujić 90+3' | Report | | Stadium: Wembley Stadium; Attendance: 89,845; Referee: Martin Atkinson |

=== During season ===
| 13 November 2016 Friendly | Liverpool | 5–0 | Accrington Stanley | Liverpool, England |
| | Can; Wilson; Brewster | Source | | Stadium: Melwood; Attendance: 0 |

=== Post-season ===
| 24 May 2017 Friendly | Sydney FC | 0–3 | Liverpool | Sydney, Australia |
| 11:00 BST | | Report | Sturridge 7'; Moreno 18'; Firmino 38' | Stadium: ANZ Stadium; Attendance: 72,892 |

== Competitions ==
=== Overall ===
| Competition | Started round | Final position / round | First match | Last match |
|---|---|---|---|---|
| Premier League | — | 4th | 14 August 2016 | 21 May 2017 |
| FA Cup | Third round | Fourth round | 8 January 2017 | 28 January 2017 |
| EFL Cup | Second round | Semi-finals | 23 August 2016 | 25 January 2017 |

Source: Competitions

=== Overview ===
| Competition | Record | | | | | | | |
| Competition | G | W | D | L | GF | GA | GD | Win % |
|---|---|---|---|---|---|---|---|---|
| Premier League | 38 | 22 | 10 | 6 | 78 | 42 | +36 | 57.89 |
| FA Cup | 3 | 1 | 1 | 1 | 2 | 2 | +0 | 33.33 |
| EFL Cup | 6 | 4 | 0 | 2 | 12 | 3 | +9 | 66.67 |
| Total | 47 | 27 | 11 | 9 | 92 | 47 | +45 | 57.45 |

Source: Competitions

=== Premier League ===
==== League table ====
| Pos | Team | Pld | W | D | L | GF | GA | GD | Pts | Qualification or relegation |
|---|---|---|---|---|---|---|---|---|---|---|
| 2 | Tottenham Hotspur | 38 | 26 | 8 | 4 | 86 | 26 | +60 | 86 | Qualification for the Champions League group stage |
| 3 | Manchester City | 38 | 23 | 9 | 6 | 80 | 39 | +41 | 78 | Qualification for the Champions League group stage |
| 4 | Liverpool | 38 | 22 | 10 | 6 | 78 | 42 | +36 | 76 | Qualification for the Champions League play-off round |
| 5 | Arsenal | 38 | 23 | 6 | 9 | 77 | 44 | +33 | 75 | Qualification for the Europa League group stage (Note: Arsenal qualified for the Europa League group stage by winning the 2016–17 FA Cup. As they had also qualified there by the virtue of their league position (5th), this spot was passed to the next-highest ranked team (6th), Manchester United.) |
| 6 | Manchester United | 38 | 18 | 15 | 5 | 54 | 29 | +25 | 69 | Qualification for the Champions League group stage (Note: Manchester United qualified for the Champions League group stage by winning the 2016–17 UEFA Europa League. Based on their league position (6th), they would have received the spot above to enter the Europa League group stage. This spot was vacated without replacement as per UEFA regulations.) |

Source: Premier League
Rules for classification: 1) Points; 2) Goal difference; 3) Goals scored; 4) Play-offs (only if needed to decide champion, teams for relegation or teams for UEFA competitions).

==== Results summary ====
| Overall | | | | | | | | Home | | | | | | Away | | | | | |
| Pld | W | D | L | GF | GA | GD | Pts | W | D | L | GF | GA | GD | W | D | L | GF | GA | GD |
|---|---|---|---|---|---|---|---|---|---|---|---|---|---|---|---|---|---|---|---|
| 38 | 22 | 10 | 6 | 78 | 42 | +36 | 76 | 12 | 5 | 2 | 45 | 18 | +27 | 10 | 5 | 4 | 33 | 24 | +9 |

==== Results by matchday ====
| Matchday | 1 | 2 | 3 | 4 | 5 | 6 | 7 | 8 | 9 | 10 | 11 | 12 | 13 | 14 | 15 | 16 | 17 | 18 | 19 | 20 | 21 | 22 | 23 | 24 | 25 | 26 | 27 | 28 | 29 | 30 | 31 | 32 | 33 | 34 | 35 | 36 | 37 | 38 |
|---|---|---|---|---|---|---|---|---|---|---|---|---|---|---|---|---|---|---|---|---|---|---|---|---|---|---|---|---|---|---|---|---|---|---|---|---|---|---|
| Ground | A | A | A | H | A | H | A | H | H | A | H | A | H | A | H | A | A | H | H | A | A | H | H | A | H | A | H | H | A | H | H | A | A | H | A | H | A | H |
| Result | W | L | D | W | W | W | W | D | W | W | W | D | W | L | D | W | W | W | W | D | D | L | D | L | W | L | W | W | D | W | D | W | W | L | W | D | W | W |
| Position | 2 | 9 | 10 | 5 | 4 | 4 | 2 | 4 | 2 | 3 | 1 | 2 | 2 | 3 | 3 | 2 | 2 | 2 | 2 | 2 | 3 | 3 | 4 | 4 | 4 | 5 | 3 | 4 | 4 | 3 | 3 | 3 | 3 | 3 | 3 | 4 | 4 | 4 |

Source: Statto
A = Away; H = Home; W = Win; D = Draw; L = Loss

==== Matches ====
Win Draw Loss

On 15 June 2016, the fixtures for the forthcoming season were announced.

| 14 August 2016 1 | Arsenal | 3–4 | Liverpool | Holloway, London |
| 16:00 BST | Walcott 31'; Coquelin (yellow card) 37'; Iwobi (yellow card) 58'; Oxlade-Chamberlain 64'; Chambers 75'; Xhaka (yellow card) 86' | Report | Lallana (yellow card) 26', (goal) 49'; Moreno (yellow card) 29'; Lovren (yellow card) 41'; Coutinho 45', 56'; Mané 63' | Stadium: Emirates Stadium; Attendance: 60,033; Referee: Michael Oliver |

| 20 August 2016 2 | Burnley | 2–0 | Liverpool | Burnley |
| 15:00 BST | Vokes 2'; Gray 37' | Report | Henderson (yellow card) 65' | Stadium: Turf Moor; Attendance: 21,313; Referee: Lee Mason |

| 27 August 2016 3 | Tottenham Hotspur | 1–1 | Liverpool | London |
| 12:30 BST | Rose (yellow card) 29', (goal) 72'; Vertonghen (yellow card) 51'; Alli (yellow card) 77' | Report | Mané (yellow card) 32'; Milner 43' (pen.); Coutinho (yellow card) 45+1'; Lovren (yellow card) 63'; Henderson (yellow card) 65'; Matip (yellow card) 90+4' | Stadium: White Hart Lane; Attendance: 31,211; Referee: Robert Madley |

| 10 September 2016 4 | Liverpool | 4–1 | Leicester City | Liverpool |
| 17:30 BST | Firmino 13', 89'; Mané 31'; Henderson (yellow card) 44'; Lallana 56' | Report | Amartey (yellow card) 28'; Vardy 38'; Drinkwater (yellow card) 57'; Huth (yellow card) 82' | Stadium: Anfield; Attendance: 53,075; Referee: Craig Pawson |

| 16 September 2016 5 | Chelsea | 1–2 | Liverpool | Fulham, London |
| 20:00 BST | Willian (yellow card) 45+1'; Costa 61' | Report | Lovren 17'; Henderson 36'; Lucas (yellow card) 89' | Stadium: Stamford Bridge; Attendance: 41,514; Referee: Martin Atkinson |

| 24 September 2016 6 | Liverpool | 5–1 | Hull City | Liverpool |
| 15:00 BST | Lallana 17'; Milner (yellow card) 19', (goal) 30' (pen.), 71' (pen.); Mané 36'; Coutinho 52' | Report | Huddlestone (yellow card) 7'; Elmohamady (red card) 29'; Mason (yellow card) 37'; Meyler 51' | Stadium: Anfield; Attendance: 53,109; Referee: Andre Marriner |

| 1 October 2016 7 | Swansea City | 1–2 | Liverpool | Swansea |
| 12:30 BST | Fer 8'; Cork (yellow card) 38'; Britton (yellow card) 54' | Report | Henderson (yellow card) 25'; Sturridge (yellow card) 39'; Firmino 54'; Milner 84' (pen.) | Stadium: Liberty Stadium; Attendance: 20,862; Referee: Michael Oliver |

| 17 October 2016 8 | Liverpool | 0–0 | Manchester United | Liverpool |
| 20:00 BST | | Report | Bailly (yellow card) 44'; Young (yellow card) 45+1'; Ibrahimović (yellow card) 90'; Fellaini (yellow card) 90+1' | Stadium: Anfield; Attendance: 52,769; Referee: Anthony Taylor |

| 22 October 2016 9 | Liverpool | 2–1 | West Bromwich Albion | Liverpool |
| 17:30 BST | Mané 20'; Coutinho 35'; Henderson (yellow card) 88' | Report | Yacob (yellow card) 43'; McClean (yellow card) 57'; McAuley 81'; Morrison (yellow card) 85' | Stadium: Anfield; Attendance: 53,218; Referee: Neil Swarbrick |

| 29 October 2016 10 | Crystal Palace | 2–4 | Liverpool | Selhurst, London |
| 17:30 BST | McArthur 18', 33'; Cabaye (yellow card) 62' | Report | Can 16', (yellow card) 49'; Lovren 21'; Matip 44'; Firmino 71', (yellow card) 72' | Stadium: Selhurst Park; Attendance: 25,628; Referee: Andre Marriner |

| 6 November 2016 11 | Liverpool | 6–1 | Watford | Liverpool |
| 14:15 GMT | Mané 27', 60'; Coutinho 30'; Can 43'; Firmino 57'; Wijnaldum (yellow card) 88', (goal) 90+1' | Report | Holebas (yellow card) 56'; Janmaat 75'; Britos (yellow card) 80' | Stadium: Anfield; Attendance: 53,163; Referee: Michael Oliver |

| 19 November 2016 12 | Southampton | 0–0 | Liverpool | Southampton |
| 15:00 GMT | Cédric (yellow card) 61' | Report | Coutinho (yellow card) 78' | Stadium: St Mary's Stadium; Attendance: 31,848; Referee: Mark Clattenburg |

| 26 November 2016 13 | Liverpool | 2–0 | Sunderland | Liverpool |
| 15:00 GMT | Lovren (yellow card) 67'; Origi 75'; Milner 90+1' (pen.) | Report | Koné (yellow card) 60'; O'Shea (yellow card) 64'; Pienaar (yellow card) 70' | Stadium: Anfield; Attendance: 53,114; Referee: Anthony Taylor |

| 4 December 2016 14 | Bournemouth | 4–3 | Liverpool | Bournemouth |
| 13:30 GMT | Wilshere (yellow card) 48'; Francis (yellow card) 50'; C. Wilson 56' (pen.); Fraser 76'; Cook 78'; Aké 90+3' | Report | Mané 20'; Origi 22'; Henderson (yellow card) 53'; Can 64', (yellow card) 87' | Stadium: Dean Court; Attendance: 11,183; Referee: Robert Madley |

| 11 December 2016 15 | Liverpool | 2–2 | West Ham United | Liverpool |
| 16:30 GMT | Lallana 5'; Origi 48'; Firmino (yellow card) 53'; Mané (yellow card) 76' | Report | Payet 27'; Antonio 39' | Stadium: Anfield; Attendance: 53,068; Referee: Mark Clattenburg |

| 14 December 2016 16 | Middlesbrough | 0–3 | Liverpool | Middlesbrough |
| 19:45 GMT | Gibson (yellow card) 69' | Report | Lallana 29', 68'; Origi 60' | Stadium: Riverside Stadium; Attendance: 32,704; Referee: Jonathan Moss |

| 19 December 2016 17 | Everton | 0–1 | Liverpool | Liverpool |
| 20:00 GMT | Barkley (yellow card) 68'; Coleman (yellow card) 69'; Gueye (yellow card) 75' | Report | Lovren (yellow card) 56'; Mané 90+4' | Stadium: Goodison Park; Attendance: 39,590; Referee: Mike Dean |

| 27 December 2016 18 | Liverpool | 4–1 | Stoke City | Liverpool |
| 17:15 GMT | Lallana 35'; Firmino 44'; Imbula 59' (o.g.); Sturridge 70' | Report | Walters 12'; Allen (yellow card) 36' | Stadium: Anfield; Attendance: 53,094; Referee: Michael Oliver |

| 31 December 2016 19 | Liverpool | 1–0 | Manchester City | Liverpool |
| 17:30 GMT | Klavan (yellow card) 7'; Wijnaldum 8'; Can (yellow card) 75' | Report | Otamendi (yellow card) 90+3' | Stadium: Anfield; Attendance: 53,120; Referee: Craig Pawson |

| 2 January 2017 20 | Sunderland | 2–2 | Liverpool | Sunderland |
| 15:00 GMT | Rodwell (yellow card) 13'; Defoe 25' (pen.), 84' (pen.); Larsson (yellow card) 52' | Report | Sturridge 19'; Milner (yellow card) 30'; Mané 72', (yellow card) 83'; Lallana (yellow card) 83' | Stadium: Stadium of Light; Attendance: 46,494; Referee: Anthony Taylor |

| 15 January 2017 21 | Manchester United | 1–1 | Liverpool | Manchester |
| 16:00 GMT | Ibrahimović 84'; Herrera (yellow card) 90+1' | Report | Milner 27' (pen.); Lovren (yellow card) 31'; Wijnaldum (yellow card) 61'; Firmino (yellow card) 90+1' | Stadium: Old Trafford; Attendance: 75,276; Referee: Michael Oliver |

| 21 January 2017 22 | Liverpool | 2–3 | Swansea City | Liverpool |
| 12:30 GMT | Klavan (yellow card) 37'; Firmino 55', 69' | Report | Llorente 48', 52'; Sigurðsson 74'; Fer (yellow card) 90' | Stadium: Anfield; Attendance: 53,169; Referee: Kevin Friend |

| 31 January 2017 23 | Liverpool | 1–1 | Chelsea | Liverpool |
| 20:00 GMT | Henderson (yellow card) 45'; Wijnaldum 57'; Milner (yellow card) 59' | Report | David Luiz 24'; Willian (yellow card) 79' | Stadium: Anfield; Attendance: 53,157; Referee: Mark Clattenburg |

| 4 February 2017 24 | Hull City | 2–0 | Liverpool | Hull |
| 15:00 GMT | Maguire (yellow card) 27'; N'Diaye 44'; Tymon (yellow card) 74'; Niasse 84' | Report | Milner (yellow card) 40' | Stadium: KCOM Stadium; Attendance: 24,822; Referee: Lee Mason |

| 11 February 2017 25 | Liverpool | 2–0 | Tottenham Hotspur | Liverpool |
| 17:30 GMT | Mané 16', 18'; Henderson (yellow card) 53'; Matip (yellow card) 56'; Milner (yellow card) 68' | Report | Son (yellow card) 28'; Kane (yellow card) 67'; Winks (yellow card) 68'; Dier (yellow card) 78'; Alderweireld (yellow card) 83' | Stadium: Anfield; Attendance: 53,159; Referee: Anthony Taylor |

| 27 February 2017 26 | Leicester City | 3–1 | Liverpool | Leicester |
| 20:00 GMT | Vardy 28', 60'; Drinkwater 39' | Report | Coutinho 68' | Stadium: King Power Stadium; Attendance: 32,034; Referee: Michael Oliver |

| 4 March 2017 27 | Liverpool | 3–1 | Arsenal | Liverpool |
| 17:30 GMT | Firmino 9'; Mané 40'; Can (yellow card) 68'; Wijnaldum 90+1' | Report | Coquelin (yellow card) 34'; Welbeck 57'; Xhaka (yellow card) 78' | Stadium: Anfield; Attendance: 53,146; Referee: Robert Madley |

| 12 March 2017 28 | Liverpool | 2–1 | Burnley | Liverpool |
| 16:00 GMT | Wijnaldum 45+1'; Can 61', (yellow card) 63'; Lallana (yellow card) 87' | Report | Barnes 7'; Mee (yellow card) 37'; Barton (yellow card) 58' | Stadium: Anfield; Attendance: 53,145; Referee: Craig Pawson |

| 19 March 2017 29 | Manchester City | 1–1 | Liverpool | Manchester |
| 16:30 GMT | Touré (yellow card) 22'; Clichy (yellow card) 50'; Silva (yellow card) 50'; Agüero 69' | Report | Firmino (yellow card) 16'; Matip (yellow card) 43'; Milner 51' (pen.); Mané (yellow card) 89' | Stadium: City of Manchester Stadium; Attendance: 54,449; Referee: Michael Oliver |

| 1 April 2017 30 | Liverpool | 3–1 | Everton | Liverpool |
| 12:30 BST | Mané 8'; Coutinho 31'; Origi 60'; Can (yellow card) 68' | Report | Davies (yellow card) 26'; Pennington 28'; Barkley (yellow card) 40'; Williams (yellow card) 62' | Stadium: Anfield; Attendance: 52,920; Referee: Anthony Taylor |

| 5 April 2017 31 | Liverpool | 2–2 | Bournemouth | Liverpool |
| 20:00 BST | Lucas (yellow card) 29'; Coutinho 40'; Origi 59' | Report | Afobe 7'; King 87'; Fraser (yellow card) 90+1' | Stadium: Anfield; Attendance: 53,292; Referee: Lee Mason |

| 8 April 2017 32 | Stoke City | 1–2 | Liverpool | Stoke-on-Trent |
| 15:00 BST | Walters 44' | Report | Klavan (yellow card) 48'; Coutinho 70'; Firmino 72', (yellow card) 73' | Stadium: Bet365 Stadium; Attendance: 27,568; Referee: Mike Dean |

| 16 April 2017 33 | West Bromwich Albion | 0–1 | Liverpool | West Bromwich |
| 13:30 BST | Brunt (yellow card) 45'; Robson-Kanu (yellow card) 49'; Evans (yellow card) 66' | Report | Firmino 45+1'; Lucas (yellow card) 72' | Stadium: The Hawthorns; Attendance: 25,669; Referee: Jonathan Moss |

| 23 April 2017 34 | Liverpool | 1–2 | Crystal Palace | Liverpool |
| 16:30 BST | Coutinho 24'; Grujić (yellow card) 89' | Report | C. Benteke (yellow card) 40', (goal) 42', 74'; Milivojević (yellow card) 60' | Stadium: Anfield; Attendance: 53,086; Referee: Andre Marriner |

| 24 April 2017 35 | Watford | 0–1 | Liverpool | Watford |
| 20:00 BST | Prödl (yellow card) 48'; Capoue (yellow card) 69'; Success (yellow card) 90+5' | Report | Lucas (yellow card) 44'; Can 45+2' | Stadium: Vicarage Road; Attendance: 20,959; Referee: Craig Pawson |

| 30 April 2017 36 | Liverpool | 0–0 | Southampton | Liverpool |
| 13:30 BST | Milner (penalty missed) 66'; Lovren (yellow card) 89' | Report | Cédric (yellow card) 65'; Ward-Prowse (yellow card) 65'; Bertrand (yellow card) 90+2' | Stadium: Anfield; Attendance: 53,159; Referee: Bobby Madley |

| 7 May 2017 37 | West Ham United | 0–4 | Liverpool | Stratford, London |
| 14:15 BST | Fernandes (yellow card) 50'; Collins (yellow card) 62' | Report | Sturridge 35'; Coutinho 57', 61'; Origi 76' | Stadium: London Stadium; Attendance: 56,985; Referee: Neil Swarbrick |

| 14 May 2017 38 | Liverpool | 3–0 | Middlesbrough | Liverpool |
| 15:00 BST | Wijnaldum 45+1'; Coutinho 51'; Lallana 56' | Report | Gestede (yellow card) 66' | Stadium: Anfield; Attendance: 53,191; Referee: Martin Atkinson |

=== FA Cup ===
Win Draw Loss

| 8 January 2017 Third round | Liverpool | 0–0 | Plymouth Argyle | Liverpool |
| 13:30 GMT | | Report | | Stadium: Anfield; Attendance: 52,692; Referee: Paul Tierney |

| 18 January 2017 Replay | Plymouth Argyle | 0–1 | Liverpool | Plymouth |
| 19:45 GMT | Songo'o (yellow card) 86' | Report | Lucas 18'; Gomez (yellow card) 25'; Ejaria (yellow card) 51'; Ojo (yellow card) 84'; Origi (penalty missed) 87' | Stadium: Home Park; Attendance: 17,048; Referee: Graham Scott |

| 28 January 2017 Fourth round | Liverpool | 1–2 | Wolverhampton Wanderers | Liverpool |
| 12:30 GMT | Wijnaldum (yellow card) 51'; Origi 86' | Report | Stearman 1', (yellow card) 29'; Weimann 41'; Hause (yellow card) 48'; Evans (yellow card) 89' | Stadium: Anfield; Attendance: 52,469; Referee: Craig Pawson |

=== EFL Cup ===
Win Draw Loss

| 23 August 2016 Second round | Burton Albion | 0–5 | Liverpool | Burton upon Trent |
| 19:45 BST | Choudhury (yellow card) 57'; Williamson (yellow card) 61' | Report | Origi 15'; Firmino 22'; Naylor 61' (o.g.); Sturridge 78', 83' | Stadium: Pirelli Stadium; Attendance: 6,450; Referee: Simon Hooper |

| 20 September 2016 Third round | Derby County | 0–3 | Liverpool | Derby |
| 19:45 BST | Johnson (yellow card) 77'; Hughes (yellow card) 79' | Report | Klavan 24'; Moreno (yellow card) 45+2'; Coutinho 50'; Origi 54'; Grujić (yellow card) 76' | Stadium: Pride Park Stadium; Attendance: 26,245; Referee: Graham Scott |

| 25 October 2016 Fourth round | Liverpool | 2–1 | Tottenham Hotspur | Liverpool |
| 19:45 BST | Sturridge 9', 64'; Alexander-Arnold (yellow card) 26'; Ings (yellow card) 83'; Grujić (yellow card) 84' | Report | Janssen 76' (pen.); Winks (yellow card) 90+1'; Wimmer (yellow card) 90+2' | Stadium: Anfield; Attendance: 53,051; Referee: Jonathan Moss |

| 29 November 2016 Fifth round | Liverpool | 2–0 | Leeds United | Liverpool |
| 19:45 GMT | Origi 76', (yellow card) 90+1'; Woodburn 81' | Report | Doukara (yellow card) 56' | Stadium: Anfield; Attendance: 52,012; Referee: Andre Marriner |

| 11 January 2017 Semi-finals First Leg | Southampton | 1–0 | Liverpool | Southampton |
| 19:45 GMT | Redmond 20'; Tadić (yellow card) 65'; Rodriguez (yellow card) 81' | Report | | Stadium: St Mary's Stadium; Attendance: 31,480; Referee: Neil Swarbrick |

| 25 January 2017 Semi-finals Second Leg | Liverpool | 0–1 (0–2 agg.) | Southampton | Liverpool |
| 20:00 GMT | | Report | Long 90+1' | Stadium: Anfield; Attendance: 52,238; Referee: Martin Atkinson |

== Squad statistics ==
=== Appearances ===
Numbers in parentheses denote appearances as substitute.
Players with no appearances not included in the list.

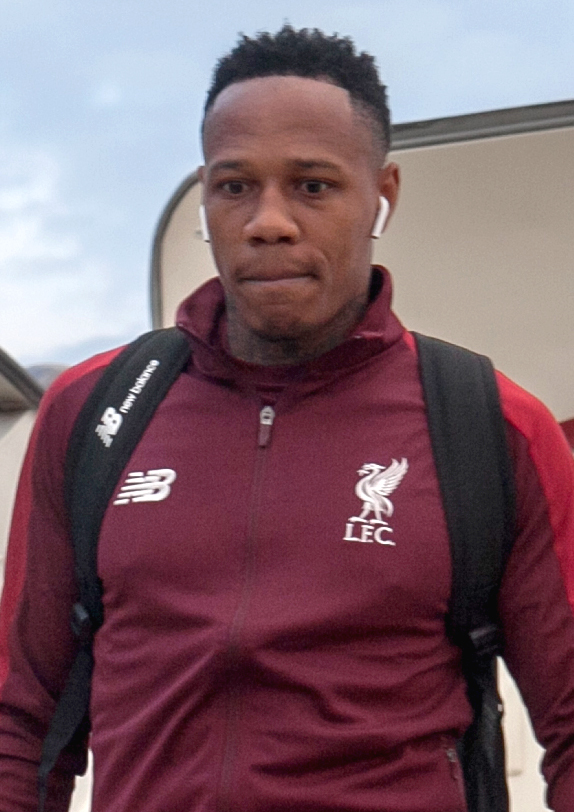
Nathaniel Clyne made the most Premier League appearances, missing only one match.

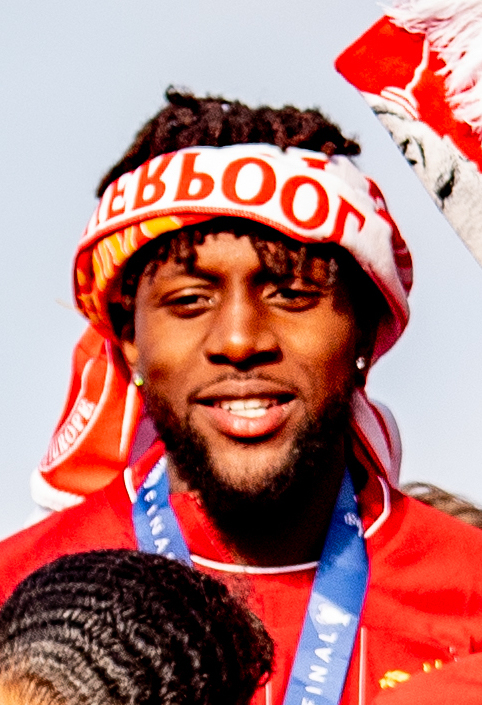
Divock Origi featured in 43 matches in all competitions, more than anyone else.

| No. | Pos. | Nat. | Name | Premier League | FA Cup | EFL Cup | Total |
| No. | Pos. | Nat. | Name | Apps | Apps | Apps | Apps |
|---|---|---|---|---|---|---|---|
| 1 | GK | (Germany) | Loris Karius | 10 | 3 | 3 | 16 |
| 2 | DF | (England) | Nathaniel Clyne | 37 | 0 | 3 (1) | 40 (1) |
| 5 | MF | (Netherlands) | Georginio Wijnaldum | 33 (3) | 1 | 3 (2) | 37 (5) |
| 6 | DF | (Croatia) | Dejan Lovren | 29 | 0 | 3 | 32 |
| 7 | DF | (England) | James Milner | 36 | 0 | 3 (1) | 39 (1) |
| 10 | MF | (Brazil) | Philippe Coutinho | 28 (3) | 1 (1) | 2 (1) | 31 (5) |
| 11 | FW | (Brazil) | Roberto Firmino | 34 (1) | 1 (1) | 4 | 39 (2) |
| 12 | DF | (England) | Joe Gomez | 0 | 3 | 0 | 3 |
| 14 | MF | (England) | Jordan Henderson | 24 | 0 | 3 | 27 |
| 15 | FW | (England) | Daniel Sturridge | 7 (13) | 1 (2) | 3 (1) | 11 (16) |
| 16 | MF | (Serbia) | Marko Grujić | 0 (5) | 0 | 2 (1) | 2 (6) |
| 17 | DF | (Estonia) | Ragnar Klavan | 15 (5) | 1 | 4 | 20 (5) |
| 18 | DF | (Spain) | Alberto Moreno | 2 (10) | 3 | 3 | 8 (10) |
| 19 | FW | (Senegal) | Sadio Mané | 26 (1) | 0 | 2 | 28 (1) |
| 20 | MF | (England) | Adam Lallana | 27 (4) | 0 (1) | 3 | 30 (5) |
| 21 | MF | (Brazil) | Lucas Leiva | 12 (12) | 3 | 4 | 19 (12) |
| 22 | GK | (Belgium) | Simon Mignolet | 28 | 0 | 3 | 31 |
| 23 | MF | (Germany) | Emre Can | 26 (6) | 1 (1) | 4 (2) | 31 (9) |
| 27 | FW | (Belgium) | Divock Origi | 14 (20) | 3 | 4 (2) | 21 (22) |
| 28 | FW | (England) | Danny Ings | 0 | 0 | 0 (2) | 0 (2) |
| 32 | DF | (Cameroon) | Joël Matip | 27 (2) | 0 | 3 | 30 (2) |
| 35 | MF | (England) | Kevin Stewart | 0 (4) | 2 | 2 (1) | 4 (5) |
| 53 | MF | (England) | Ovie Ejaria | 0 (2) | 3 | 2 (1) | 5 (3) |
| 54 | MF | (England) | Sheyi Ojo | 0 | 1 (1) | 0 | 1 (1) |
| 56 | DF | (England) | Connor Randall | 0 | 1 | 0 | 1 |
| 58 | FW | (Wales) | Ben Woodburn | 1 (4) | 3 | 0 (1) | 4 (5) |
| 59 | MF | (Wales) | Harry Wilson | 0 | 0 (1) | 0 | 0 (1) |
| 66 | DF | (England) | Trent Alexander-Arnold | 2 (5) | 2 | 3 | 7 (5) |

=== Goalscorers ===
Includes all competitive matches.

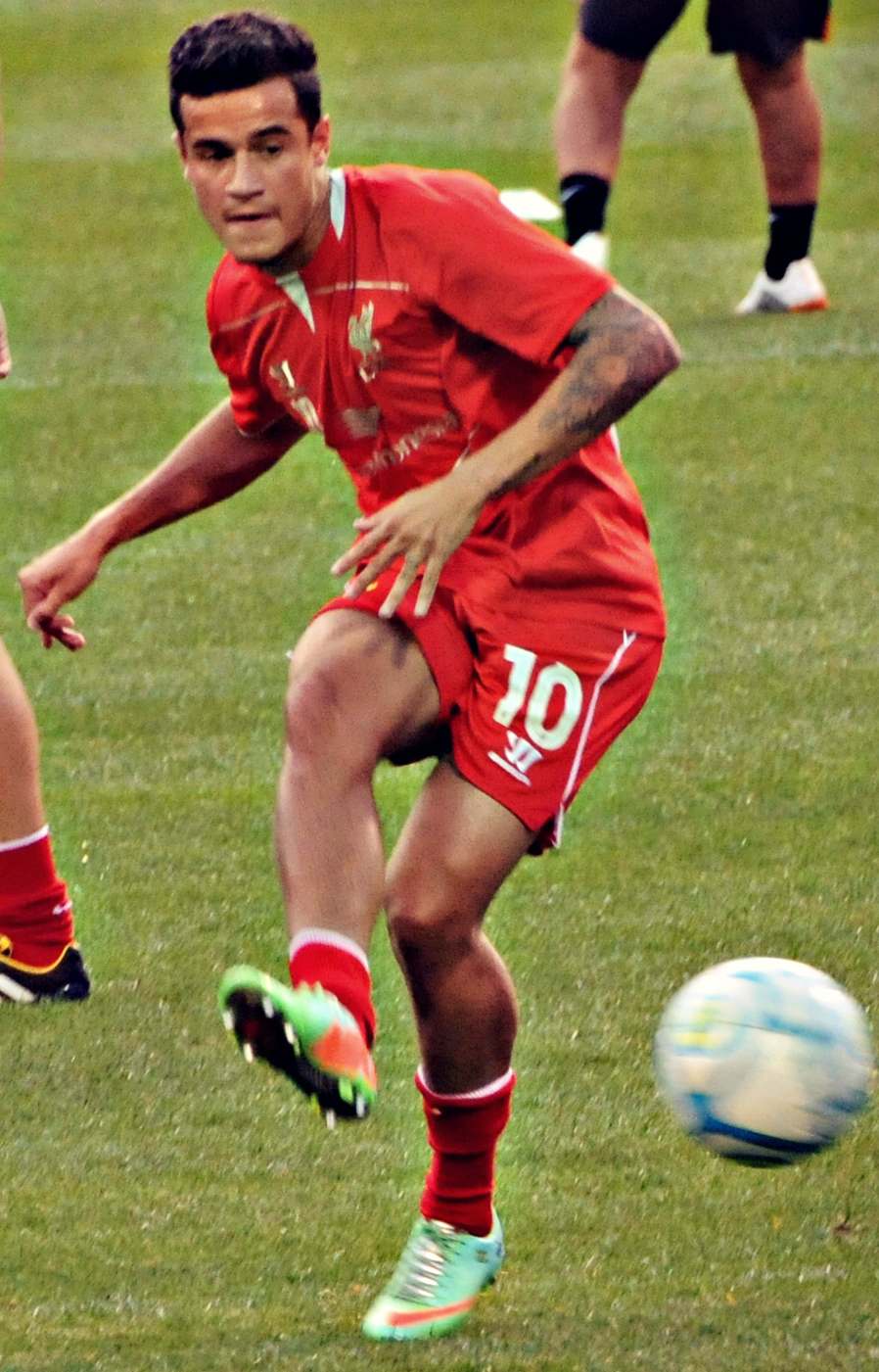
Philippe Coutinho was Liverpool's top scorer, with 14 goals in all competitions.

| Rank | Pos. | No. | Player | Premier League | FA Cup | EFL Cup | Total |
|---|---|---|---|---|---|---|---|
| 1 | MF | 10 | (Brazil) Philippe Coutinho | 13 | 0 | 1 | 14 |
| 2 | MF | 19 | (Senegal) Sadio Mané | 13 | 0 | 0 | 13 |
| 3 | FW | 11 | (Brazil) Roberto Firmino | 11 | 0 | 1 | 12 |
| 4 | FW | 27 | (Belgium) Divock Origi | 7 | 1 | 3 | 11 |
| 5 | MF | 20 | (England) Adam Lallana | 8 | 0 | 0 | 8 |
| 6 | DF | 7 | (England) James Milner | 7 | 0 | 0 | 7 |
| 6 | FW | 15 | (England) Daniel Sturridge | 3 | 0 | 4 | 7 |
| 8 | MF | 5 | (Netherlands) Georginio Wijnaldum | 6 | 0 | 0 | 6 |
| 9 | MF | 23 | (Germany) Emre Can | 5 | 0 | 0 | 5 |
| 10 | DF | 6 | (Croatia) Dejan Lovren | 2 | 0 | 0 | 2 |
| 11 | MF | 14 | (England) Jordan Henderson | 1 | 0 | 0 | 1 |
| 11 | DF | 17 | (Estonia) Ragnar Klavan | 0 | 0 | 1 | 1 |
| 11 | MF | 21 | (Brazil) Lucas | 0 | 1 | 0 | 1 |
| 11 | DF | 32 | (Cameroon) Joël Matip | 1 | 0 | 0 | 1 |
| 11 | FW | 58 | (Wales) Ben Woodburn | 0 | 0 | 1 | 1 |
| # | Own goals | | | 1 | 0 | 1 | 2 |
| Total | | | | 78 | 2 | 12 | 92 |

=== Clean sheets ===
Includes all competitive matches. The list is sorted alphabetically by surname when total clean sheets are equal.

| No. | Player | Premier League | FA Cup | EFL Cup | Total |
|---|---|---|---|---|---|
| 22 | (Belgium) Simon Mignolet | 9 | 0 | 2 | 11 |
| 1 | (Germany) Loris Karius | 3 | 2 | 1 | 6 |

=== Disciplinary record ===
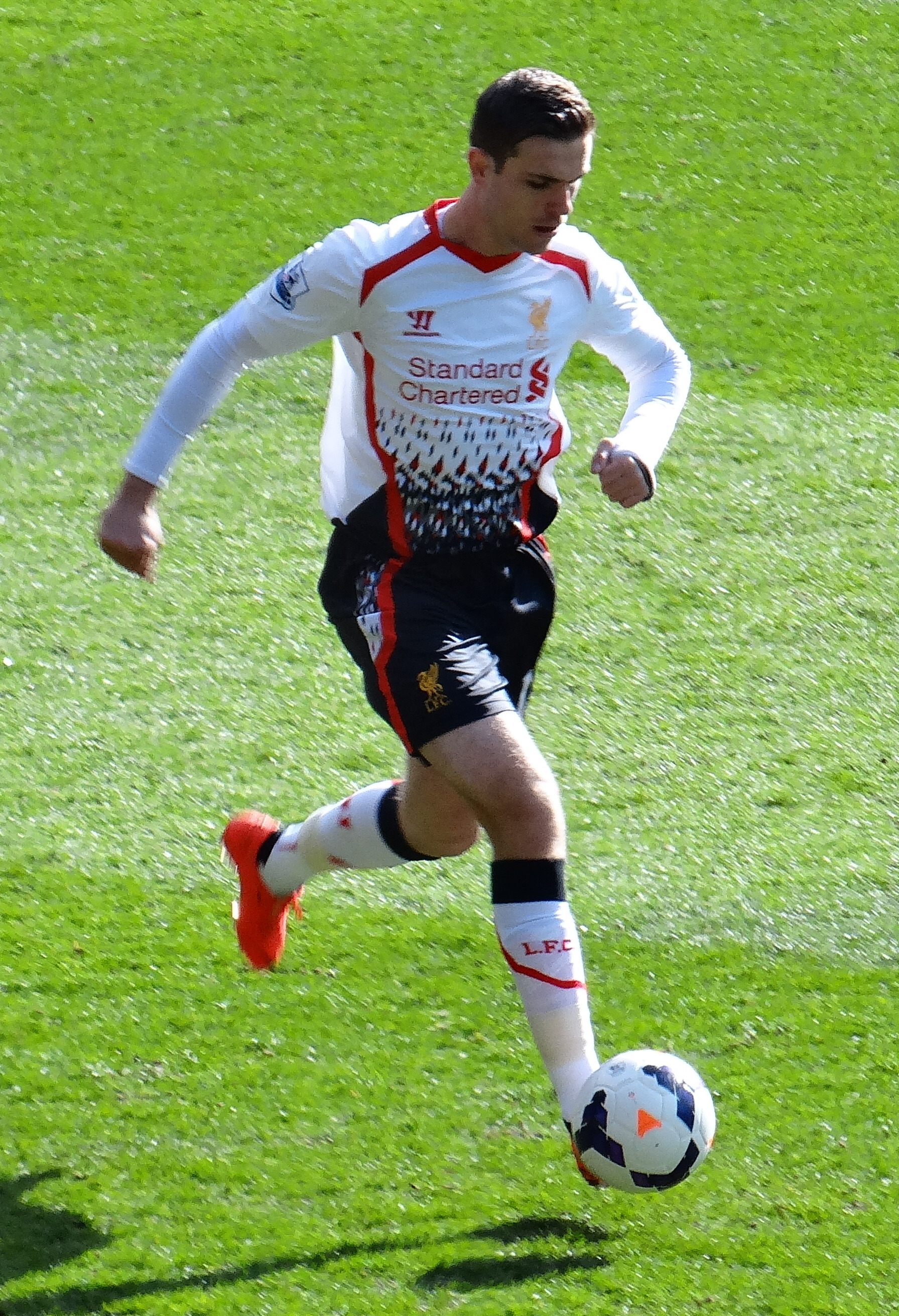
Club captain Jordan Henderson was booked eight times, more than any other Liverpool player.

| No. | Pos. | Name | Premier League | | FA Cup | | EFL Cup | | Total | |
| No. | Pos. | Name | Booked | Sent off (straight red) | Booked | Sent off (straight red) | Booked | Sent off (straight red) | Booked | Sent off (straight red) |
|---|---|---|---|---|---|---|---|---|---|---|
| 14 | MF | Jordan Henderson | 8 | 0 | 0 | 0 | 0 | 0 | 8 | 0 |
| 6 | DF | Dejan Lovren | 6 | 0 | 0 | 0 | 0 | 0 | 6 | 0 |
| 23 | MF | Emre Can | 6 | 0 | 0 | 0 | 0 | 0 | 6 | 0 |
| 7 | DF | James Milner | 5 | 0 | 0 | 0 | 0 | 0 | 5 | 0 |
| 11 | FW | Roberto Firmino | 4 | 0 | 0 | 0 | 0 | 0 | 4 | 0 |
| 21 | MF | Lucas Leiva | 4 | 0 | 0 | 0 | 0 | 0 | 4 | 0 |
| 5 | MF | Georginio Wijnaldum | 2 | 0 | 1 | 0 | 0 | 0 | 3 | 0 |
| 16 | MF | Marko Grujić | 1 | 0 | 0 | 0 | 2 | 0 | 3 | 0 |
| 17 | DF | Ragnar Klavan | 3 | 0 | 0 | 0 | 0 | 0 | 3 | 0 |
| 19 | FW | Sadio Mané | 3 | 0 | 0 | 0 | 0 | 0 | 3 | 0 |
| 20 | MF | Adam Lallana | 3 | 0 | 0 | 0 | 0 | 0 | 3 | 0 |
| 10 | MF | Philippe Coutinho | 2 | 0 | 0 | 0 | 0 | 0 | 2 | 0 |
| 18 | DF | Alberto Moreno | 1 | 0 | 0 | 0 | 1 | 0 | 2 | 0 |
| 32 | DF | Joël Matip | 2 | 0 | 0 | 0 | 0 | 0 | 2 | 0 |
| 12 | DF | Joe Gomez | 0 | 0 | 1 | 0 | 0 | 0 | 1 | 0 |
| 27 | FW | Divock Origi | 0 | 0 | 0 | 0 | 1 | 0 | 1 | 0 |
| 28 | FW | Danny Ings | 0 | 0 | 0 | 0 | 1 | 0 | 1 | 0 |
| 53 | MF | Ovie Ejaria | 0 | 0 | 1 | 0 | 0 | 0 | 1 | 0 |
| 54 | MF | Sheyi Ojo | 0 | 0 | 1 | 0 | 0 | 0 | 1 | 0 |
| 66 | DF | Trent Alexander-Arnold | 0 | 0 | 0 | 0 | 1 | 0 | 1 | 0 |
| Total | | | 50 | 0 | 4 | 0 | 6 | 0 | 60 | 0 |

== Club awards ==
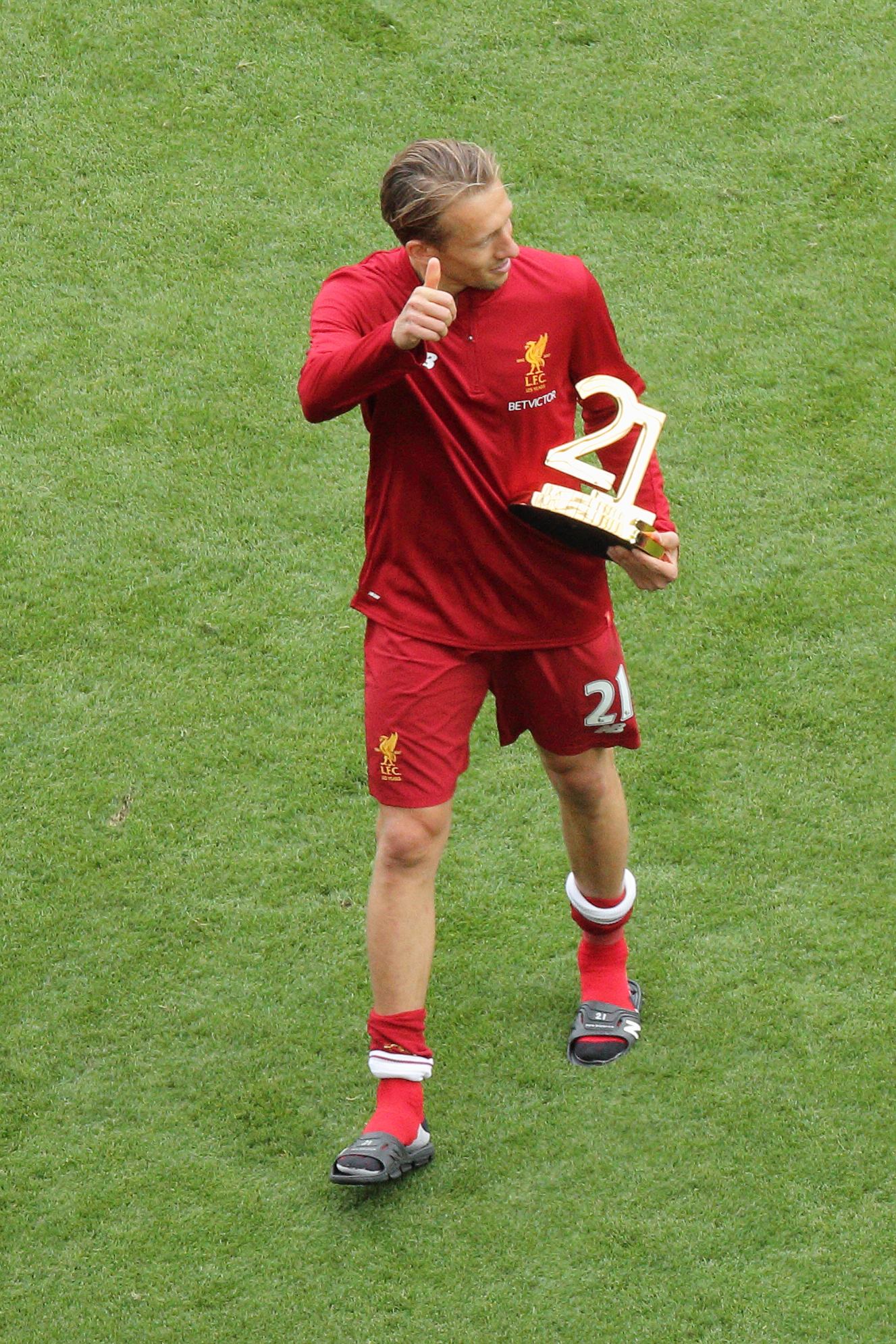
Lucas Leiva received the Special Recognition Award, to mark his 10 years at the club.

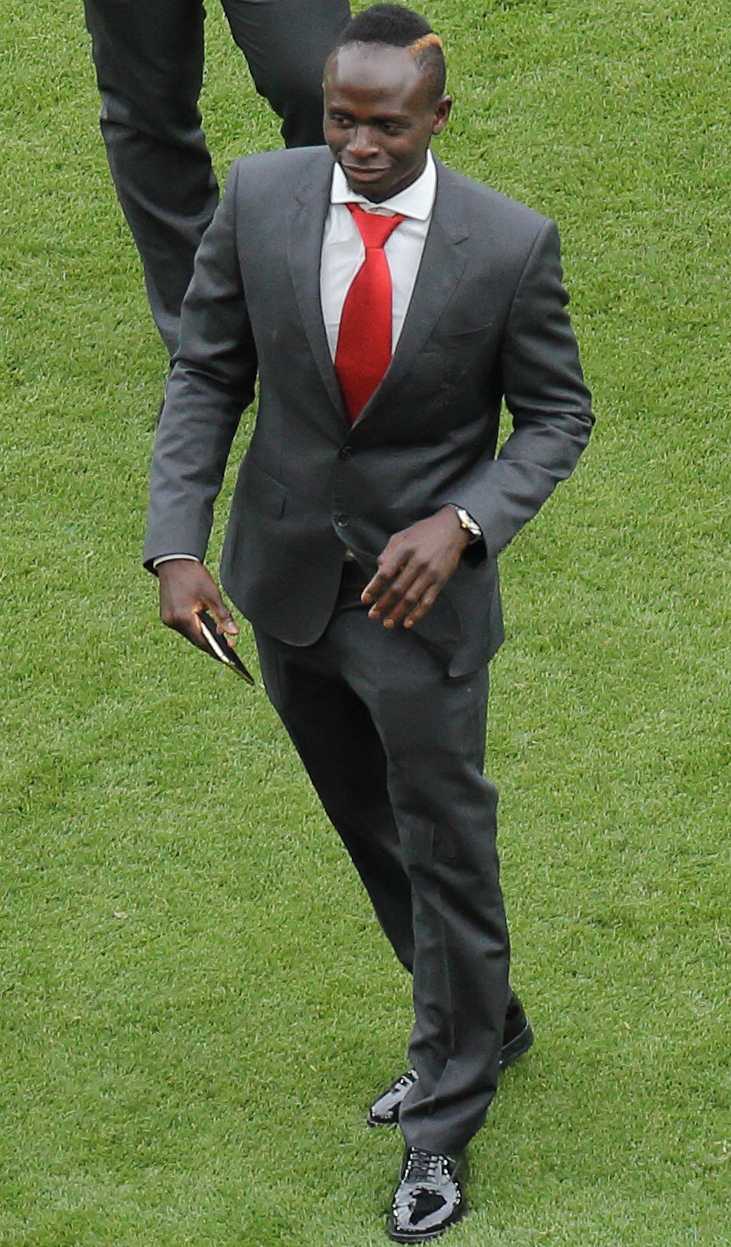
Summer signing Sadio Mané won Players' Player and Supporters' Player of the Year awards.

=== End-of-season awards ===
The 2017 Liverpool FC Players' Awards event was held at Anfield on 9 May 2017.

- Liverpool Players' Player of the Year Award: Sadio Mané
- Liverpool Supporters' Player of the Year Award: Sadio Mané
- Liverpool Supporters' Young Player of the Year Award: Trent Alexander-Arnold
- Goal of the Season Award: Emre Can (vs. Watford, 1 May 2017)
- Academy’s Players’ Player of the Year: Ben Woodburn
- Liverpool Ladies FC Players’ Player of the Season: Sophie Ingle
- Lifetime Achievement Award: Roger Hunt
- Bill Shankly Community Award: Jeremy Barnes
- Supporters’ Club of the Year: Cyprus
- Staff Recognition Award: Disability support team
- Special Recognition Award: Lucas Leiva
- Outstanding Team Achievement Award: Rome 1977 team

=== Liverpool Standard Chartered Player of the Month award ===
Awarded monthly to the player that was chosen by fans voting on liverpoolfc.com

| Month | Player | Votes |
|---|---|---|
| August | (Senegal) Sadio Mané | 77% |
| September | (England) Adam Lallana | 51% |
| October | (Brazil) Philippe Coutinho | 56% |
| November | (Cameroon) Joël Matip | |
| December | (England) Adam Lallana | 55% |
| January | (Netherlands) Georginio Wijnaldum | 22% |
| February | (Senegal) Sadio Mané | |
| March | (Netherlands) Georginio Wijnaldum | 51% |
| April | (Brazil) Philippe Coutinho | 37% |
