= Divock Origi =

Belgian footballer (born 1995)

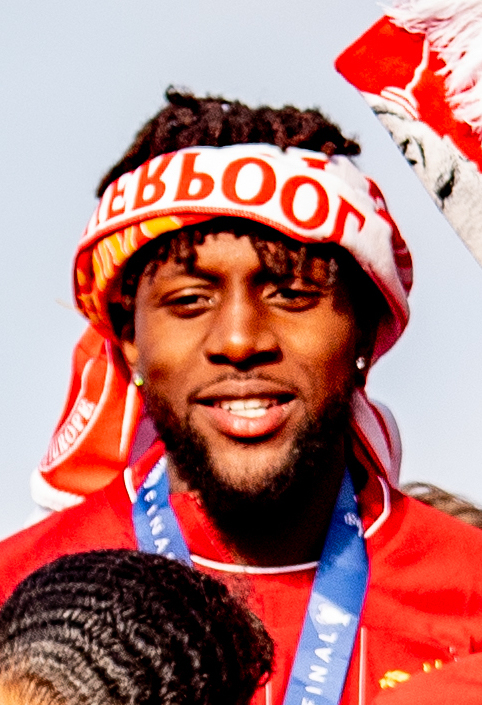
- Origi during Liverpool's 2019 Champions League victory parade

Personal information
- Full name: Divock Okoth Origi
- Date of birth: 18 April 1995 (age 31)
- Place of birth: Ostend, Belgium
- Height: 1.89 m (6 ft 2 in)
- Position: Striker

Youth career
- 2001–2010: Genk
- 2010–2012: Lille

Senior career*
Years	Team	Apps	(Gls)
2012–2013	Lille II	11	(2)
2012–2014	Lille	40	(6)
2014–2022	Liverpool	107	(22)
2014–2015	→ Lille (loan)	33	(8)
2017–2018	→ VfL Wolfsburg (loan)	31	(6)
2022–2025	AC Milan	27	(2)
2023–2024	→ Nottingham Forest (loan)	20	(0)
Total		269	(46)

International career
2010	Belgium U15	2	(0)
2010–2011	Belgium U16	9	(1)
2011	Belgium U17	1	(0)
2012–2013	Belgium U19	19	(10)
2014–2015	Belgium U21	2	(0)
2014–2022	Belgium	32	(3)
- * Club domestic league appearances and goals

Divock Okoth Origi (born 18 April 1995) is a Belgian former professional footballer who played as a striker.

Origi began his career at Lille, and scored on his professional debut for them in 2013. A year and a half later, he was signed for £10 million by Premier League club Liverpool, who loaned him back to Lille for the 2014–15 Ligue 1 season. After struggling at Liverpool due to injuries, and spending a year on loan at VfL Wolfsburg, Origi made various crucial contributions to the club during the 2018–19 season. Most notably, he scored two goals, including the winning goal, in the 2019 Champions League semi-final comeback against Barcelona. He was also a part of the squad that won the 2019–20 Premier League the following season, Liverpool's first league title for 30 years. In 2022, after winning a domestic double with Liverpool the previous season, Origi signed for AC Milan. He spent the 2023–24 season on loan at Nottingham Forest, and terminated his Milan contract in 2025.

Origi made his international debut for Belgium in 2014 and was part of their team which reached the quarter-finals of the 2014 FIFA World Cup, during which he became the youngest goalscorer in Belgian World Cup history as a 19 year old.

== Early and personal life ==
Origi was born in Ostend and grew up in Houthalen-Oost. He was born into a family of footballers: his father, Mike Origi, played for KV Oostende (at the time Divock was born) and Genk, among other Belgian clubs, as well as the Kenya national team. His uncle, Austin Oduor Origi, played for Gor Mahia in the Kenyan Premier League while his other uncles, Gerald and Anthony, played for Tusker. His cousin, Arnold Origi, is also a professional player who has been capped for the Kenyan national team as a goalkeeper. The Origi family is of Kenyan Luo ethnicity. Origi speaks four languages fluently: Swahili, English, Dutch and French.

Origi is a Christian. He has said, "My religion, being a Christian, has values of working hard, staying focused on the right things that helps you in life. Of course you're going to slip. I made mistakes. But those mistakes helped me and still help me these days."

In 2021, the Divock Origi Scholarship was introduced when Origi partnered with the University of Liverpool to provide undergraduate courses to students with financial troubles. The scholarship covers tuition fees (£9,250 per year) as well as an annual payment of £3,000 towards living costs. Originally, in the 2021–22 academic year, the scholarship was offered to two students with the prospect to increase the enrolment in the future.

== Club career ==
=== Early career ===
Origi began his career playing football at Genk's youth academy where he spent nine years before signing for Lille in May 2010, aged 15, after turning down an approach by Manchester United.

=== Lille ===
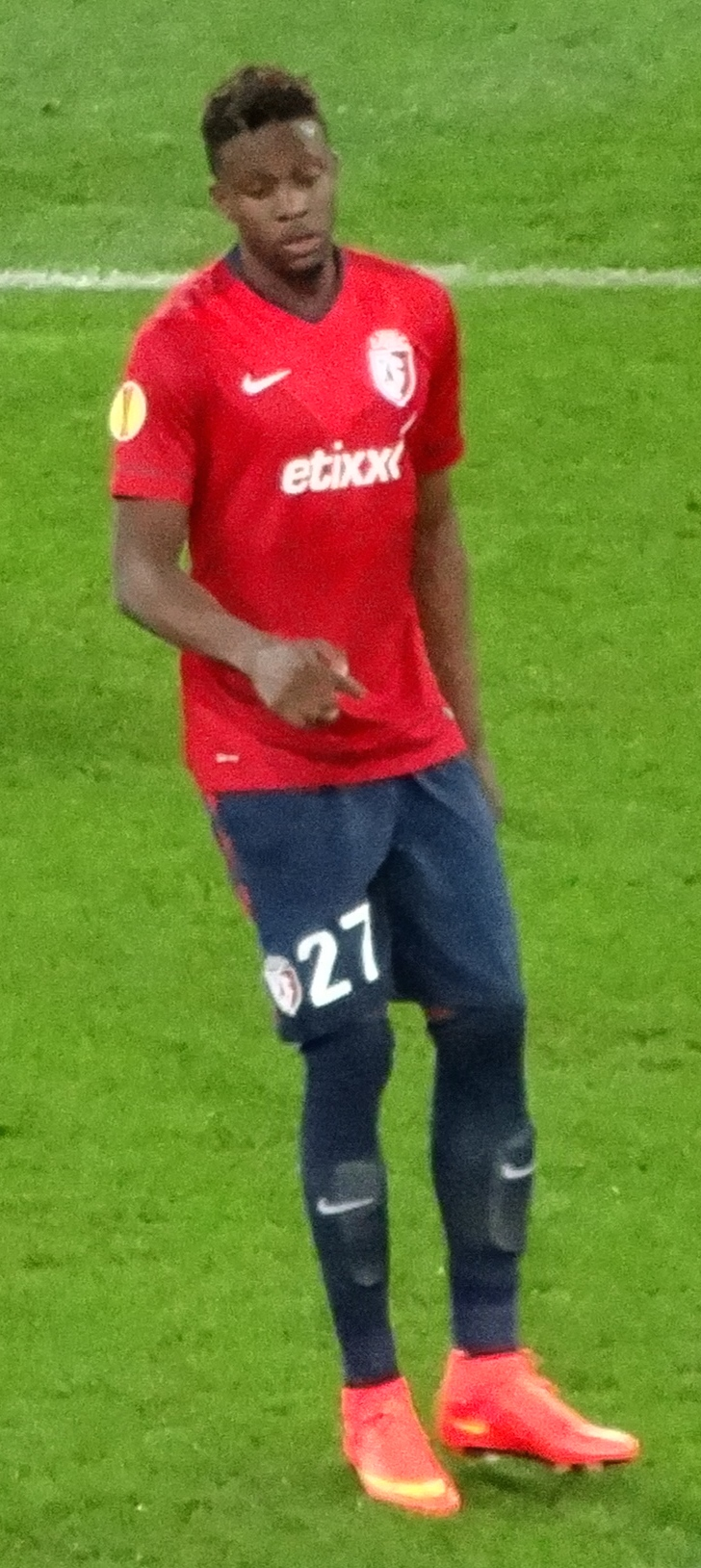
Origi playing for Lille in 2014

On 24 January 2013, Origi was an unused substitute in Lille's 3–1 away win over Plabennec in a 2012–13 Coupe de France match. Nine days later, he scored on his competitive debut for the senior Lille side, coming on as a substitute in the 69th minute for Ronny Rodelin and scoring to bring his side level from 1–0 down against Troyes.

=== Liverpool ===
On 29 July 2014, Premier League club Liverpool announced that they had completed a £10 million transfer for Origi, who signed a five-year contract, but was immediately loaned back to Lille for the 2014–15 season.

==== Loan to Lille ====
In his first match back in Lille, Origi scored his first goal of the new Ligue 1 season through a penalty against Caen to secure a 1–0 win for his side. This was after he had been brought down in the box by defender Dennis Appiah, who was sent off by the referee towards the 70th minute.

On 11 December 2014, as Lille lost 0–3 at home to VfL Wolfsburg to be eliminated from the UEFA Europa League group stage, Origi had a penalty saved by Diego Benaglio. On 15 March 2015, Origi scored a hat-trick for Lille in a 3–0 league win against Rennes.

==== Return to Liverpool ====
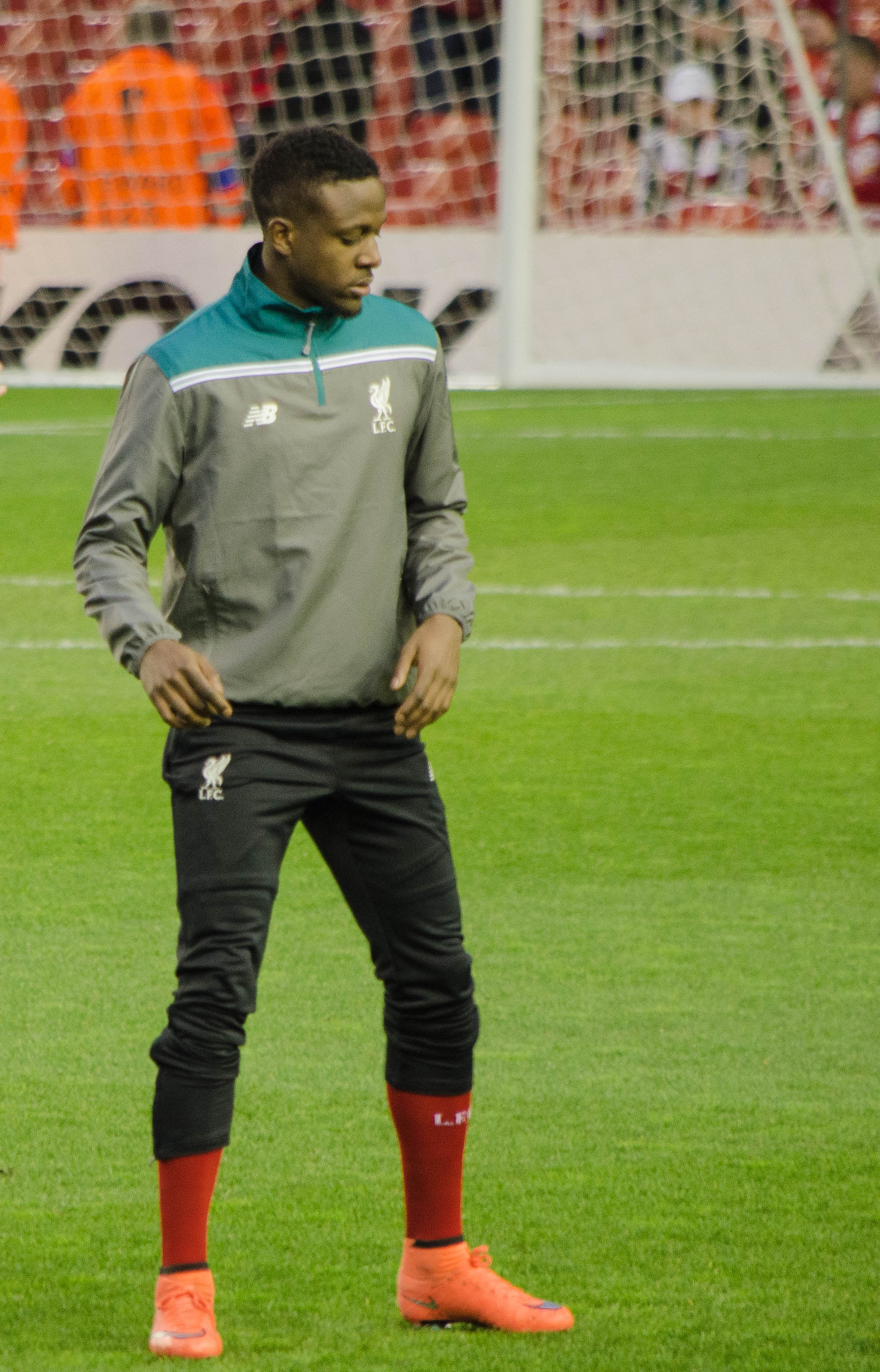
Origi with Liverpool in 2016

On 11 July 2015, Origi was named in Liverpool's 30-man squad for their pre-season tour of Thailand, Australia and Malaysia. In his non-competitive debut for Liverpool, a pre-season friendly against Thai All-Stars on 14 July, Origi scored his first goal for the club in a 4–0 win.

His first competitive game for the team was on 12 September, replacing Danny Ings for the final sixteen minutes of a 3–1 loss at rivals Manchester United. Origi scored his first competitive Liverpool goals on 2 December, a hat-trick in a 6–1 away win over Southampton in the quarter-finals of the League Cup. Eleven days later, he scored his first Premier League goal, replacing the injured Dejan Lovren in the 79th minute and scoring an added-time equaliser from outside the penalty area for a 2–2 draw against West Bromwich Albion at Anfield. On 14 February, he scored his second league goal against Aston Villa in a 6–0 victory, only 27 seconds after replacing Daniel Sturridge in the second half; this was the fastest goal scored by a substitute that season.

On 7 April 2016, Liverpool manager Jürgen Klopp surprisingly started Origi ahead of Sturridge (the team's first-choice striker) during Liverpool's Europa League quarter-final match against Borussia Dortmund, Klopp's former side. Origi scored a vital away goal in a 1–1 draw. Three days later, he scored two goals in a 4–1 win over Stoke City after coming on as a substitute to replace Sheyi Ojo at half-time.

On 20 April 2016, Origi sustained a severe ankle ligament injury in a home game against Everton. This was caused by a foul tackle by Everton defender Ramiro Funes Mori who received a red card and subsequent three match ban.

Origi was used predominantly as a substitute and cup player at the start of the 2016–17 season. He scored his first goal of the season on 23 August 2016 in a 5–0 EFL Cup win over Burton Albion. He scored his first 2016–17 Premier League goal on 26 November, coming off the bench for the injured Philippe Coutinho to score the opener in a 2–0 win over Sunderland. On 1 April 2017, he scored Liverpool's third in a 3–1 win against rivals Everton. On 14 May, he scored Liverpool's fourth in a 4–0 win against West Ham United, edging the team closer to Champions League qualification.

==== Loan to VfL Wolfsburg ====
On 31 August 2017, Bundesliga club VfL Wolfsburg signed Origi on a season-long loan. He scored his first goal for the club against Werder Bremen, on 19 September. He scored six goals in total for the club during his loan spell.

==== Return to Liverpool ====
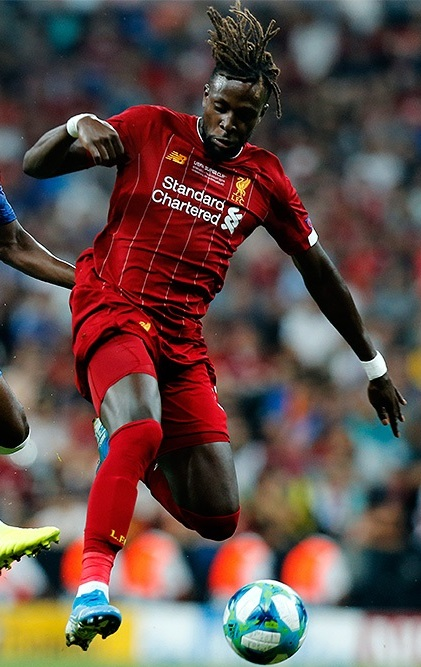
Origi playing for Liverpool in the 2019 UEFA Super Cup

On 2 December 2018, Origi scored his first goal of the season in a Merseyside derby match against city rivals Everton, which Liverpool won 1–0. Origi came on as a substitute for Roberto Firmino in the 84th minute and scored with a header in the 96th minute, capitalising on an error from Everton goalkeeper Jordan Pickford. On 4 May 2019, he scored a last-minute goal against Newcastle in a 3–2 victory, keeping Liverpool's hunt for their first title since the introduction of the Premier League alive.

On 7 May 2019, Origi scored for the first time in the Champions League, netting a brace in the semi-final second leg against Barcelona, vitally scoring the final goal to complete Liverpool's comeback from a three-goal first leg defeat. On 1 June 2019, he scored Liverpool's second goal in a 2–0 win over Tottenham in the 2019 UEFA Champions League final, as he won his first honour with the club. In doing so, he became only the second Belgian player to score in a Champions League final after Yannick Carrasco in 2016.

On 10 July 2019, Origi signed a new long-term contract with Liverpool. On 30 October, Origi scored twice, including a last minute bicycle kick in an EFL Cup match against Arsenal which Liverpool eventually won on penalties following a 5–5 regular time finish. On 4 December, he scored two goals as Liverpool beat rival Everton 5–2 in the Merseyside derby to extend their unbeaten run in league football to 32 matches, which was a new club record.

Origi featured seventeen times and scored only one goal for Liverpool over the course of the 2020–21 season. His second goal in the 2021–22 season was a scorpion kick inside the six-yard box in a 2–0 EFL Cup win over Preston North End on 27 October. He scored Liverpool's winning goal in a 2–1 win away to AC Milan on 7 December 2021, as Liverpool became the first English club to win all six Champions League group games in the competition's history.

In June 2022, it was announced by Liverpool that Origi would leave the club at the end of the month when his contract expired.

=== AC Milan ===
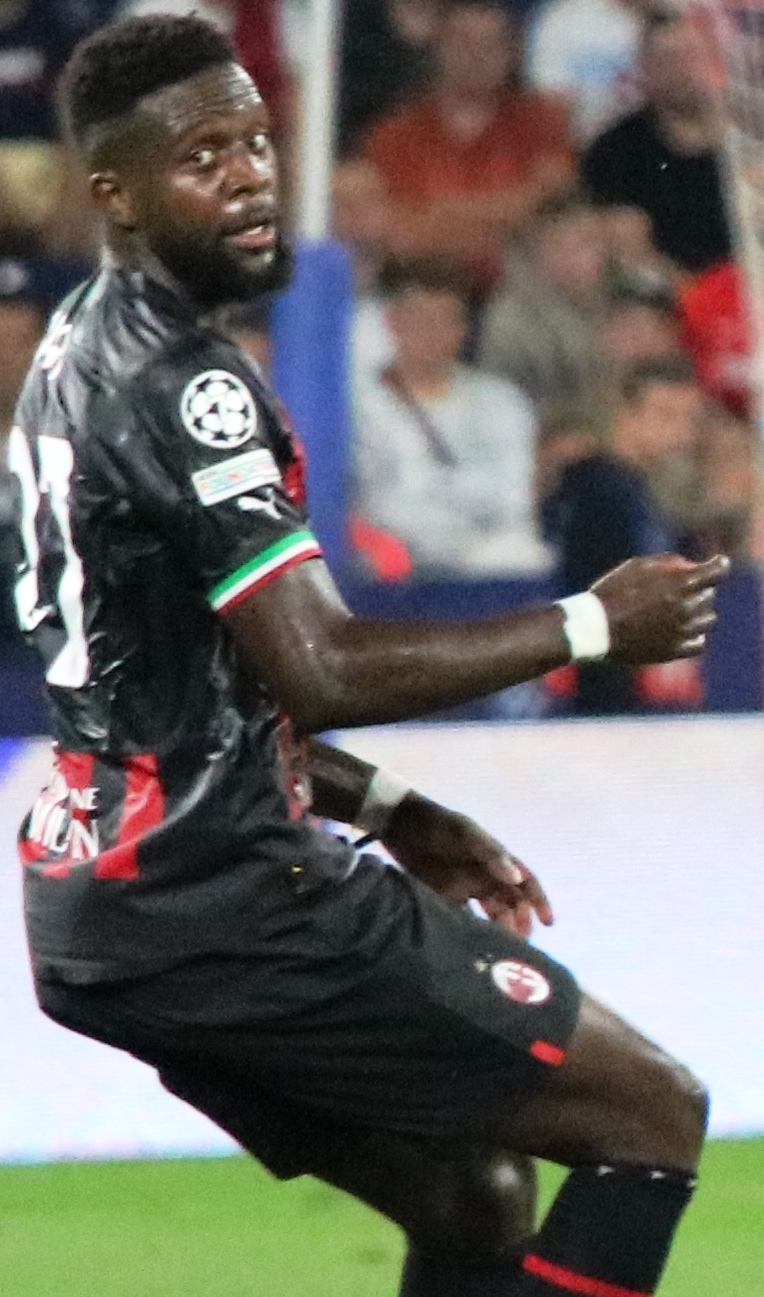
Origi playing for AC Milan in 2022

On 5 July 2022, Origi signed for Serie A club AC Milan on a four-year contract.

==== Loan to Nottingham Forest ====
On 1 September 2023, Origi joined Premier League club Nottingham Forest on a season-long loan with an option to buy. On 7 February 2024, he scored his first and only goal for Forest in a 1–1 draw against Bristol City in the 2023–24 FA Cup, which his team would go on to win on penalties.

==== Return to AC Milan ====
By July 2024, Origi returned to AC Milan but according to Zlatan Ibrahimović, the striker would play only for their newly created reserve team Milan Futuro.

He terminated his contract with the club on 22 December 2025, more than 600 days after his last competitive appearance.

On 8 June 2026, Origi announced his retirement from professional football.

== International career ==
Origi has represented Belgium at under-15, under-16, under-17, under-19 and under-21 level. He scored ten goals while in the under-19 team, the first in a 2013 UEFA European Under-19 Championship qualification match against Belarus on 12 October 2012.

The Football Kenya Federation expressed an interest in persuading Origi to play for the Kenya senior national team in the future. However, on 13 May 2014, Belgium senior national team manager Marc Wilmots announced Origi would be part of the 23-man squad representing Belgium at the 2014 FIFA World Cup.

Origi came on as a substitute for Romelu Lukaku in the 58th minute of the opening Group H game against Algeria in Belo Horizonte on 17 June. In Belgium's second match, again after coming on as a substitute for Lukaku, he scored his first senior international goal in the 88th minute of a 1–0 win over Russia to qualify the Red Devils for the knockout stage. In so doing, at 19 years, two months and four days, he became the youngest goalscorer of the tournament (until American winger Julian Green scored against Belgium during their round of 16 match), the youngest goalscorer in Belgian World Cup history, and the first player of Kenyan origin to score at a World Cup finals. For his performances, he was named the Young Talent of the 2014 Belgian Sportsman of the year awards.

Origi scored once in Belgium's successful UEFA Euro 2016 qualifying campaign, in a 6–0 home win over Andorra on 10 October 2014. He was included in the squad for the final tournament, but missed out on the 2018 FIFA World Cup.

== Style of play ==
Liverpool manager Jürgen Klopp described Origi as "a legend on and off the pitch. Fantastic footballer, a world class striker and [he] is our best finisher".

== Career statistics ==
=== Club ===
Appearances and goals by club, season and competition
Club	Season	League			National cup (Note: Includes Coupe de France, FA Cup, DFB-Pokal)		League cup (Note: Includes Coupe de la Ligue, Football League/EFL Cup)		Europe		Other		Total	
Club	Season	Division	Apps	Goals	Apps	Goals	Apps	Goals	Apps	Goals	Apps	Goals	Apps	Goals
Lille II	2012–13	CFA	11	2	—		—		—		—		11	2
Lille	2012–13	Ligue 1	10	1	0	0	0	0	0	0	—		10	1
Lille	2013–14	Ligue 1	30	5	4	1	1	0	—		—		35	6
Lille	2014–15	Ligue 1	33	8	1	0	2	0	8 (Note: Three appearances in UEFA Champions League, five appearances and one goal in UEFA Europa League)	1	—		44	9
Lille	Total		73	14	5	1	3	0	8	1	—		89	16
Liverpool	2015–16	Premier League	16	5	1	0	4	3	12 (Note: Appearances in UEFA Europa League)	2	—		33	10
Liverpool	2016–17	Premier League	34	7	3	1	6	3	—		—		43	11
Liverpool	2017–18	Premier League	1	0	—		—		0	0	—		1	0
Liverpool	2018–19	Premier League	12	3	1	1	0	0	8 (Note: Appearances in UEFA Champions League)	3	—		21	7
Liverpool	2019–20	Premier League	28	4	3	0	1	2	6	0	4 (Note: One appearance in FA Community Shield, one appearance in UEFA Super Cup, two appearances in FIFA Club World Cup)	0	42	6
Liverpool	2020–21	Premier League	9	0	2	0	2	1	4	0	0	0	17	1
Liverpool	2021–22	Premier League	7	3	1	0	3	2	7	1	—		18	6
Liverpool	Total		107	22	11	2	16	11	37	6	4	0	175	41
VfL Wolfsburg (loan)	2017–18	Bundesliga	31	6	3	0	—		—		2 (Note: Appearances in Bundesliga relegation play-offs)	1	36	7
AC Milan	2022–23	Serie A	27	2	0	0	—		8	0	1 (Note: Appearance in Supercoppa Italiana)	0	36	2
Nottingham Forest (loan)	2023–24	Premier League	20	0	2	1	—		—		—		22	1
Career total			269	46	21	4	19	11	53	7	7	1	369	69

=== International ===
Appearances and goals by national team and year
National team	Year	Apps	Goals
Belgium	2014	13	3
Belgium	2015	4	0
Belgium	2016	6	0
Belgium	2017	2	0
Belgium	2018	1	0
Belgium	2019	3	0
Belgium	2021	2	0
Belgium	2022	1	0
Total		32	3

Belgium score listed first, score column indicates score after each Origi goal

List of international goals scored by Divock Origi
No.	Date	Venue	Cap	Opponent	Score	Result	Competition	Ref.
1	22 June 2014	Maracanã Stadium, Rio de Janeiro, Brazil	5	Russia	1–0	1–0	2014 FIFA World Cup	
2	10 October 2014	King Baudouin Stadium, Brussels, Belgium	10	Andorra	4–0	6–0	UEFA Euro 2016 qualifying	
3	12 November 2014	King Baudouin Stadium, Brussels, Belgium	12	Iceland	2–1	3–1	Friendly	

== Honours ==
Liverpool

- Premier League: 2019–20
- FA Cup: 2021–22
- Football League/EFL Cup: 2021–22; runner-up: 2015–16
- UEFA Champions League: 2018–19
- UEFA Super Cup: 2019
- FIFA Club World Cup: 2019
- UEFA Europa League runner-up: 2015–16

Individual

- Belgian Sportsman Promising Talent of the Year: 2014
