= 2017–18 Liverpool F.C. season =

English football club season

Liverpool
2017–18 season
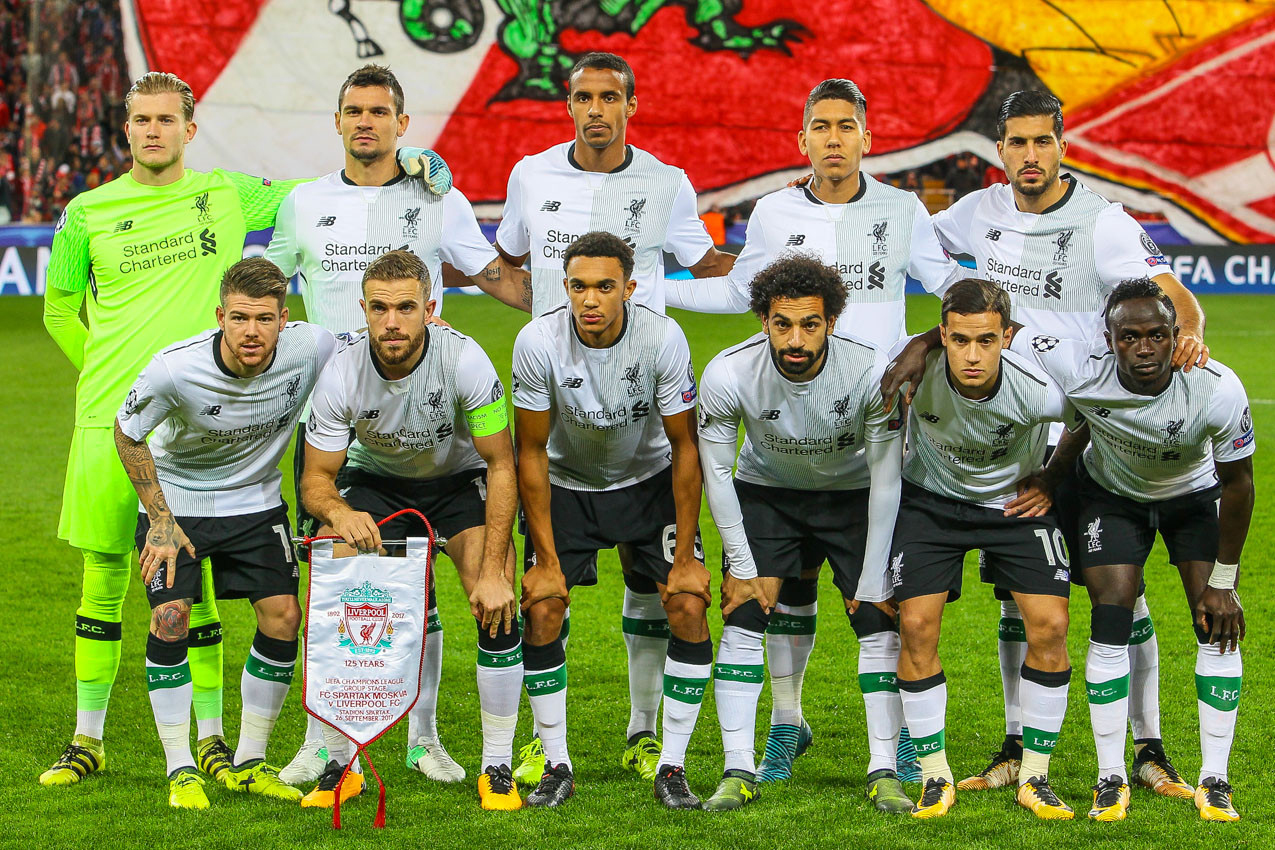
- Liverpool players before Spartak Moscow away, 26 September 2017
- Owner: Fenway Sports Group
- Chairman: Tom Werner
- Manager: Jürgen Klopp
- Stadium: Anfield
- Premier League: 4th
- FA Cup: Fourth round
- EFL Cup: Third round
- UEFA Champions League: Runners-up
- Top goalscorer: League: Mohamed Salah (32); All: Mohamed Salah (44)
Home colours	Away colours	Third colours

The 2017–18 season was Liverpool Football Club's 126th season in existence and their 56th consecutive season in the top flight of English football. It was also the club's 26th consecutive season in the Premier League. Along with the Premier League, Liverpool also competed in the FA Cup, EFL Cup and UEFA Champions League. The season covered the period from 1 July 2017 to 30 June 2018. It began with an away 3–3 draw against Watford in the league and ended with a 3–1 loss to Real Madrid in the UEFA Champions League final.

== Season review ==
=== Pre-season ===
Liverpool began their preseason in the same manner as last year, a visit to Tranmere Rovers on 12 July. Liverpool won 0–4 with goals from James Milner (from the penalty spot), Marko Grujić, Pedro Chirivella, and Ben Woodburn (from the penalty spot as well.) The Reds next trip was to Wigan Athletic on 14 July where they drew 1–1 going 1–0 down early, but the equalizing goal coming in first half stoppage time from new signing Mohamed Salah. On 19 July, Liverpool played their first match of the 2017 Premier League Asia Trophy friendly tournament in Hong Kong against Crystal Palace. The Reds won 2–0 thanks to goals from another new signing, Dominic Solanke, and Divock Origi. The Reds advanced to the final, played on 22 July, the day after announcing new signing Andy Robertson on a deal from Hull City, against Leicester City. Liverpool won the tournament defeating Leicester in the final 2–1, despite conceding first, due to goals from Salah and Philippe Coutinho.

Liverpool returned to Europe to play their next pre-season match on 29 July against Hertha BSC, a match that celebrated the two clubs respective 125th anniversaries of existence. Liverpool got the better of the German side winning 0–3 in Berlin with goals scored by Solanke, Gini Wijnaldum, and Salah. Liverpool's next two matches were as a part of another pre-season tournament as the club partook in the 2017 Audi Cup, defeating Bayern Munich at Bayern's home stadium 0–3 in their first match of the tournament on 1 August, the goals coming from Sadio Mané, yet another from Salah, and Daniel Sturridge. In the final on the next day, Liverpool lost to Atlético Madrid, 1–1 (4–5 in penalties) with a Roberto Firmino spot kick pushing the game to penalties before ultimately losing. In the days before their final pre-season match, Liverpool were dealt a blow as it was revealed that Adam Lallana was injured in the final and, according to manager Jürgen Klopp, would be out for "a couple of months." In the final friendly on 5 August in Dublin against Athletic Bilbao, Liverpool finished strong winning the match 3–1 thanks to Firmino's spot kick, Woodburn's strike in the second half, and Solanke's headed finish.

=== August ===
Liverpool began their Premier League campaign on 12 August with a trip to Vicarage Road to take on Watford. Watford opened the scoring in the eighth minute with a Stefano Okaka header off a corner kick, however Mane levelled in the 29th minute, only for Abdoulaye Doucouré to give Watford a 2–1 in the 32nd where it stood at the half. In the second half, Liverpool took the lead after goals from Firmino from the spot and Salah in the 55th and 57th minutes, respectively. However, in the 93rd Miguel Britos once again levelled the game with a controversial equalizer off another corner kick to set the score at 3–3 where the game finished. Following the match, manager Klopp expressed disappointment in the equalizer counting making the claim that Britos was offside when scoring. Liverpool had no time to despair over lost points as they set off to Germany to square off with Hoffenheim in the first leg of their Champions League qualifier on 15 August. The match was Liverpool's first Champions League match since December 2014. In the tenth minute, Simon Mignolet made a penalty save to keep the game level at 0–0 where it stood until Trent Alexander-Arnold's 35th minute free kick goal, the first in a Liverpool shirt for him. A James Milner attempted cross deflected off Håvard Nordtveit and that went down as an own goal to make it 0–2 in the 74th. Hoffenheim responded with a Mark Uth 87th-minute goal but, despite the nervy finish, Liverpool saw off the final minutes of the 1–2 victory in the away leg. Liverpool returned home for the first time in the season where on 19 August they played Crystal Palace. The Reds were victorious defeating Palace 1–0 thanks to a Mane goal in the 73rd. This marked the first victory at home against Palace for Liverpool since 2013. On 23 August, Liverpool played the home leg of their Champions League qualifier against Hoffenheim. Liverpool got off to a fantastic early start with a 3–0 scoreline after 21 minutes thanks to two goals from Emre Can and one from Salah. Uth pulled one back in the 28th to make it 3–1, however, Firmino tacked one more on in the 63rd making it 4–1. Sandro Wagner made it 4–2 in the 79th, but it was only a consolation goal as Liverpool won 4–2 (6–3 on aggregate) and advanced on to the Champions League group stage. Liverpool's final game of the month, and before the international break, was at home against Arsenal on 27 August. In what was called a "dazzling attacking display", Liverpool won 4–0 thanks to goals before the half from Firmino and Mane in the 17th and 40th minutes, respectively, and goals after the half from Salah in the 57th minute and Sturridge in the 77th minute. On 29 August, Liverpool made a transfer move for the 2018–19 season as the club announced Naby Keïta from RB Leipzig would join the club effective 1 July 2018.

=== September ===
Liverpool's September began with a visit to the City of Manchester Stadium to take on Manchester City on 9 September. Manchester City opened the scoring through Sergio Agüero in the 25th minute, and a Mane high boot drew a hotly-debated red card putting the Reds down to ten men. From there City scored four more goals, two from Gabriel Jesus and two from Leroy Sané to mark a 5–0 victory. Liverpool manager Klopp felt that the challenge was not a red card worthy incident and noted the event was a "game-changing incident." Liverpool next began UEFA Champions League group stage play at home against Sevilla on 13 September. The Reds went down in the 5th minute after a costly Dejan Lovren mistake allowed Wissam Ben Yedder to tap Sevilla ahead. Liverpool roared back in response with a Firmino goal in the 21st and a Salah goal in the 37th to put them back on top before the half. In the 41st minute, however, with the chance to put Liverpool ahead by two goals, Firmino missed a chance from the penalty spot. Joaquín Correa drew Sevilla level in the 72nd and the game finished at 2–2. Liverpool faced a Premier League fixture next as they squared off with Burnley on 16 September. The match was notable for being Philippe Coutinho's return to the Liverpool starting eleven following a busy transfer window in which Barcelona had widely reported interest in the player to the point where the club released a statement explicitly stating Coutinho would remain a Liverpool player at the close of the summer window. Scott Arfield put the visitors up 0–1 in the 27th, however Salah responded with an equalizer just three minutes later to put the scoreline at 1–1 where it stood till the final whistle. The Reds faced another midweek test on 19 September where they faced off with Leicester City at King Power Stadium in the Carabao Cup. Leicester scored twice in the second half through Shinji Okazaki and Islam Slimani in the 65th and 78th minutes to knock the Reds out of the Cup tournament with a 2–0 defeat. That weekend, on 23 September, Liverpool played a second game at King Power Stadium against Leicester, this time in the league. Salah kicked off scoring in the 15th while Coutinho scored his first goal of the season with a stunning free kick in the 23rd to put Liverpool up 0–2. Right before the halftime whistle, Okazaki got Leicester a goal back on a scrambled effort off a corner kick. Captain Jordan Henderson put the Reds up 1–3 in the 68th with a counter-attacking goal, however Jamie Vardy got the goal back just a minute later. In the 73rd, goalie Simon Mignolet gave up a penalty kick, which, taken by Vardy, was saved by the keeper to keep the scoreline at 2–3, the final score. The final game of the month was another Champions League group stage bout, this time in Moscow against Spartak Moscow on 26 September. Spartak opened the scoring off a 23rd minute Fernando free kick, however Liverpool responded in the 31st through a Coutinho goal. The game finished level at one and Liverpool earned another point in group stage play.

=== October ===
Liverpool opened their October on the first of the month at St James' Park against Newcastle. Coutinho, through an out of the box effort, put Liverpool ahead in the 29th minute, however Newcastle leveled just seven minutes later through a Joselu goal that resulted after an attempted Joël Matip tackle deflected off Joselu and into the net. The scoreline remained at 1–1 for the rest of the game resulting in a draw. Following the international break, the Reds returned to action on 14 October at Anfield to square off with Manchester United in a match that ended 0–0. The Reds then returned to midweek action heading to Slovenia to take on Maribor on 17 October. In a record breaking performance, Liverpool thrashed Maribor 0–7 breaking the record for biggest away win not just in Liverpool history but by any English side in the European competition. Goals came from Firmino, Coutinho, Salah, another from Firmino, a second from Salah, the first of Alex Oxlade-Chamberlain's Liverpool career, and a capper from Trent Alexander-Arnold. On 22 October, Liverpool visited Wembley Stadium to take on Tottenham. The Reds fell behind 2–0 quickly following defensive mistakes in which Lovren drew heavy criticism for. Lovren was later subbed off for Chamberlain at the 30th minute. Salah drew Liverpool back one in the 24th, but Dele Alli chipped a goal in before the stroke of halftime. Harry Kane put in his second of the game in the 56th and the Reds were given a 4–1 defeat. The final fixture of the month took place on 28 October back at Anfield against newly promoted Huddersfield Town, managed by Klopp's longtime friend David Wagner. Following a 0–0 first half, including a saved Salah penalty in the 43rd, the Reds put three past Huddersfield in the second half. The first came from Sturridge in the 50th, the second from Firmino just eight minutes later, and the final coming from Wijnaldum in the 75th to cap off a 3–0 victory.

=== November ===
November opened up for Liverpool on the first of the month at Anfield in their home fixture against Maribor in the Champions League group stage. Following a goalless first half, the Reds scored three in the second to get a 3–0 victory over their Slovenian counterparts. The goals came from Salah in the 49th, Emre Can in the 64th, and Sturridge in the 90th. The Reds were also given a penalty kick in the 54th, but Milner could not take advantage. This victory put the Reds one point clear at the top of their group. Following that mid-week bout, the Reds then traveled to London to take on West Ham on 4 November. Salah and Matip put the Reds ahead 0–2 at the half as they scored within three minutes of each other, but West Ham countered in the 55th through Manuel Lanzini. Just a minute later, however, the Reds got their goal back through Oxlade-Chamberlain's first league goal as a Liverpool player. Salah added his second of the game in the 75th and Liverpool went on to a 1–4 victory in what was ultimately Slaven Bilić's final match in charge of the Hammers. Following international break, the Reds were back in action on 18 November at home against Southampton, marking Virgil van Dijk's first visit to Anfield following links with Liverpool in which the club had to make a public statement renouncing interest in the Dutchman. The Reds enjoyed two first-half goals in ten minutes from Salah and a third in the 68th minute from Coutinho en route to a 3–0 victory. Up next was the second meeting in the group against Sevilla, this time in Spain on 21 November. The Reds roared at the start with goals from Firmino in the 2nd, Mane in the 22nd, and Firmino again in the 30th to go up 0–3 at the half. Unfortunately, the good times stopped there as Ben Yedder scored first in the 51st off an Éver Banega free kick, then again in the 60th off a penalty kick, both of which the fouls conceded were given up by Alberto Moreno, who received substantial criticism for these two missteps in spite of his otherwise solid "reboot" to his Liverpool career. Liverpool held on until the 93rd minute in which Guido Pizarro leveled the game at 3–3 and completed the Sevilla comeback. The Reds took a point, however, and remained at the top of the group through five games. The Reds then had to look to recover in time for their weekend bout back at Anfield against defending champions Chelsea on 25 November. Salah scored against his former club putting Liverpool up 1–0 in the 65th, but off the bench Willian equalized at 1–1 in the 85th on a shot that appeared to be an attempt to cross the ball. The score stayed this way till the end and twice in a week Liverpool let in a late equalizer. The final fixture of the month occurred at the Bet365 Stadium as Liverpool traveled to take on Stoke City in a mid-week Premier League bout on 29 November. Mane put the Reds out front in the 17th and gave them the halftime lead, then Salah, off the bench, scored two in six minutes to give Liverpool the 0–3 victory capping off a month of four games of where the Reds won by three goals.

=== December ===
Liverpool opened a busy December with a game at the Falmer Stadium against Brighton & Hove Albion on 2 December. Two goals within a minute of each other, first from Can (who was playing at centre back) then Firmino, gave Liverpool a 0–2 lead and they finished the game winning 1–5 thanks to additional goals from Firmino, Coutinho, and a Dunk own goal. Brighton's only goal came from Glenn Murray who scored from the penalty spot. The next game was the final game of the Champions League group stage, a home bout against Spartak Moscow on 6 December. Liverpool needed a result to make it to the next round so tensions were running high at Anfield. However, the Reds dispatched Spartak 7–0, with goals coming from Firmino, Salah, a double from Mane and a hat trick for Coutinho and finished the group at the top. The next fixture was the first league installment of the season of the Merseyside derby against crosstown rivals Everton on 10 December at Anfield. Liverpool maintained control throughout the first half and Salah's curling effort in the 42nd minute gave Liverpool the lead. Liverpool continued to dominate but a dubious penalty decision against Lovren saw Wayne Rooney converted a penalty in the 77th to tie the game at 1–1 where it finished. Klopp said following the game about the controversial penalty incident, "In my understanding, it's not a penalty." The next game was yet another held at Anfield where Liverpool hosted West Brom on 13 December. The game was a 0–0 stalemate against West Brom at Anfield, with the most notable event being an 82nd minute Solanke goal was disallowed for a handball drawing conversation on whether or not the correct call was made. On 17 December at the Vitality Stadium, Liverpool took on Bournemouth. The Reds bounced back in the next game winning 0–4 with goals from Coutinho, Lovren, and Salah before the half, and Firmino after. The next game was against Arsenal at the Emirates on 22 December. In an exciting affair, Liverpool went 0–2 up through Coutinho in the 26th and Salah in the 52nd minute, but Arsenal took the lead with three goals in five minutes through goals from Alexis Sánchez, Granit Xhaka (on a long shot in which goalie Mignolet was heavily criticized for not doing better) and Mesut Özil. The Reds evened the score at 3–3 with a 71st-minute goal from Firmino giving the team their 8th league draw in 19 games, at the time the second most in the league. Liverpool then returned to Anfield for their Boxing Day fixture against bottom-place Swansea City. Coutinho gave the Liverpool early in the first half and the game stood at 1–0 at half, but with a goal from Firmino in the 52nd, one from Alexander-Arnold in the 65th, another from Firmino in the 66th, and a capper from Oxlade-Chamberlain in the 82nd gave the Reds a 5–0 victory. On 27 December, ahead of the New Year, Liverpool also welcomed the news of long-term target Virgil van Dijk, signed for a generally reported fee going up to £75 million. With their new signing in attendance, Liverpool played their final match of the calendar year on 30 December against Leicester at Anfield. Vardy gave the Foxes a 0–1 lead in the 3rd where it stood until the 52nd with a Salah equalizer. Salah scored again in the 76th giving Liverpool a 2–1 victory and ensuring the Reds would end 2017 in the top four.

=== January ===
The Reds opened their 2018 on the first day of the year by traveling to Turf Moor to take on Burnley. Mane broke the deadlock in the 61st with a goal but Jóhann Berg Guðmundsson leveled the score in the 87th minute. The Reds, however, were able to get all three points off a Ragnar Klavan header in the 94th minute with a 1–2 final. Following the triumph in the league, the Reds hosted Everton for the second time in under 30 days, this time in the third round of the 2017–18 FA Cup on 5 January. While Everton received the hotly contested penalty in the first meeting, Liverpool was the one to benefit from a controversial penalty call as Mason Holgate brought Lallana down inside the box and Milner converted the penalty in the 35th minute. The derby match also featured Holgate and Firmino getting into a verbal altercation shortly before the end of the first half following a push from Holgate to Firmino that sent the latter over the advertising boards. In the 67th minute, Gylfi Sigurðsson scored on a counterattack to equalize the game at one. In the 84th minute, however, van Dijk in his Liverpool debut scored off a corner kick making it 2–1 and marking a second game in a row with a late headed goal from a defender to win the game. The day after, on 6 January, the club made the official announcement that (subject to a medical and personal terms) Coutinho would be leaving for Barcelona on a deal that Paul Joyce of The Times reported could reach up to £142 million. Coutinho was subsequently announced by Barcelona that day. On 14 January, Liverpool took on the undefeated Manchester City at Anfield in hopes of deal City their first loss in the league as well as a measure of revenge for the 0–5 loss the Reds were dealt in the reverse fixture. Liverpool started off strong with an Oxlade-Chamberlain goal in the ninth minute, but City scored an equalizer through in the 40th through a Leroy Sane effort. From the 59th to the 68th, Liverpool extended the lead to 4–1 through goals from Firmino, Mane, and Salah in a thrilling ten minutes of action. City got one back in the 84th from Bernardo Silva and another from İlkay Gündoğan in the 91st put it at 4–3, but the Reds held on and doled City their first loss of the league season. The next game for the Reds was a 22 January meeting in South Wales against Swansea and recently placed manager Carlos Carvalhal. Alfie Mawson scored the lone goal of the match in the 40th minute and the bottom place Swans took all three from the Reds with a 1–0 defeat given to the visitors. In the fourth round proper of the FA Cup, on 27 January, Liverpool took on West Brom. Firmino's chip in the fifth gave the early lead, but a four-minute double to Jay Rodriguez put West Brom up 1–2 in the 11th. Video assistant referee replay played a crucial first half role as it denied Craig Dawson a goal to make the game 1–3, then awarded a penalty to Liverpool, which was subsequently missed by Firmino. West Brom added a third with an own goal from Matip late in first half added time. Salah put the Reds within one in the 78th, but the 2–3 scoreline stood and the Reds were stunned at home by the second from bottom Baggies in the cup. The final fixture of the month was on 30 January where the Reds visited John Smith's Stadium and Huddersfield Town. Emre Can's long range effort in the 26th put the Reds up 0–1 early, and Firmino added a second right before the break. Salah's 78th minute spot kick made it 0–3 and Liverpool finished January with a comfortable victory.

=== February ===
February's first fixture occurred on the 4th when the Reds welcomed Tottenham to Anfield. Liverpool were off to a flying start following Salah's goal in the third minute giving Liverpool an early 1–0 lead. The score stayed this way until a screamer from Victor Wanyama in the 80th set off a frenetic close to the game. The 85th minute saw goalie Loris Karius come out and attempt to slide tackle the ball away from Harry Kane, however referee Jon Moss awarded a controversial penalty to Spurs for an infraction where some fans and pundits claimed Kane dived in hopes to win a call. Kane took, and subsequently missed, the kick in the 87th and in the 91st minute, Salah gave an outstanding solo effort to find a seeming winner for the Reds, but yet again a controversial penalty was given when van Dijk attempted to clear the ball from the box but missed and hit Erik Lamela. Kane took this penalty as well and converted in the 95th leaving the game level at 2–2. A frustrated Klopp stated following the game, "I don't understand either of the penalty situations. The first one was offside and the second, I know already what the ref and his assistant will say. There was a touch, a little touch. But Lamela has jumped into him and wanted the touch and to go down." Spurs manager Mauricio Pochettino saw the incidents differently saying, "Both were a penalty and it is not controversial. Sometimes people complain about the referee, but when they are right it is good to tell everyone." The Reds had a week off until their trip to St Mary's Stadium in Southampton on 11 February. In winter signing van Dijk's first match back in Southampton, the Reds won the match 0–2 with goals from Firmino in the sixth and Salah in the 42nd.Although Van Dijk did receive a hostile reception. The next fixture for Liverpool was on Valentine's Day in Portugal where the Reds played in the round of 16 of the Champions League for the first time since 2009. Against Porto, the Reds opened scoring in the 25th through a Mane goal that was also mishandled by Porto keeper José Sá. Salah added another goal in the 29th to take the lead to 0–2, where it stood at the halftime whistle. In the second half, the goals continued as Mane added a second in the 53rd, Firmino scored his first of the game in the 69th, and Mane got his hat-trick goal in the 85th to give the Reds a 0–5 first leg victory. Following a four-day mini camp in Marbella the Reds returned home for their final fixture of the month on 24 February against West Ham. Can opened the scoring with a header off a corner in the 29th, and Salah in the 51st and Firmino in the 57th added on to the lead. Michail Antonio added one for the Hammers in the 59th to put the score at 3–1, but a Mane goal in the 77th to make it 4–1 put the game away and, for the day, the Reds moved into second place.

=== March ===
Liverpool's first match of the month was a home bout on 3 March against Newcastle, as the Reds welcomed back manager Rafa Benítez, who won the 2005 Champions League with the club. Salah opened the scoring in the 40th minute and Mane put in another in the 55th to give the Reds a comfortable 2–0 victory over the Magpies. The Reds then played mid-week at home on 6 March against Porto in the return fixture of the Champions League round of 16. It was a quiet affair, Mane had a chance that hit the post and Danny Ings had a strong effort saved, but the game ended 0–0 and Liverpool moved on to the quarterfinals. Following these matches, on 10 March Liverpool traveled to Old Trafford in another iteration of the Northwest Derby against Manchester United. Marcus Rashford scored twice in ten minutes to give United a 2–0 lead within 25 minutes, were the score stood till the half. An Eric Bailly own goal put Liverpool back in business in the 66th, but it was not enough and a 2–1 scoreline was final. The loss put the Reds five points back of second place. On 16 March, the Reds learned that their Champions League quarterfinal opponent would be the only other English team remaining, Manchester City. The fixtures were set for 4 April at Anfield and 10 April at the City of Manchester Stadium. The following day, Liverpool returned to Anfield to square off with Watford and, in stylish fashion, dispatched the Hornets 5–0. Salah had his first English hat trick as he scored in the 4th, 43rd, and 77th, and then added one more for good measure in the 85th. Firmino added in one of his own in the 49th. The final fixture of the month occurred on 31 March at Selhurst Park against Crystal Palace. Palace opened the scoring in the 13th with a Luka Milivojević spot kick and the 1–0 scoreline held into halftime. Just four minutes into the second half, however, Liverpool struck back with a Mane goal off a Milner cross. The 1–1 deadlock was broken as Salah slotted home another in the 84th and the Reds took a 1–2 victory out of London.

=== April ===
Liverpool opened up the month of April of the fourth as they took on Manchester City at Anfield in the first leg of the Champions League quarter-finals. The Reds got off to a flying start with goals from Salah in the 12th, Oxlade-Chamberlain off a brilliant effort from outside the box in the 21st, and finally Mane in the 31st. The Reds finished with a comfortable 3–0 victory and for the second time this season defeated City at home. In between the first and second legs, Liverpool traveled across the river to take on Merseyside rivals Everton at Goodison Park on 7 April. The affair ended 0–0, with the best effort coming from Yannick Bolasie, who tried a curling effort only for it to be saved well by Karius. The Reds could not find a goal, and their opportunity to go second in the table was missed. Up next was the second leg of the quarter-finals at the City of Manchester Stadium against Manchester City on 10 April. City needed at least three goals, and they found one almost immediately from Gabriel Jesus in just the second minute. The Reds seemed slightly wobbled, and chances from Bernardo Silva and a goal ruled offside from Leroy Sane highlighted that. Following the half, however, with City manager Pep Guardiola sent to the stands during the break, Liverpool found their away goal in the 56th from Salah, and another in the 77th from Firmino. The Reds would win 1–2 and advance 5–1 on aggregate to the semi-finals. Liverpool returned home to Anfield to take on Bournemouth on 14 April, and they celebrated their advancement with a strong 3–0 showing. The goals came from Mane in the 7th, Salah in the 69th, and Firmino with a 90th minute addition to the scoreline. Next came a match with bottom-place West Brom on 21 April. The Baggies, coming off a victory at Manchester United to clinch the title in favor of Manchester City, had already forced Liverpool to drop points at Anfield and defeated them in the FA Cup. Liverpool found another early goal through Danny Ings, his first since the final match of Brendan Rodgers' tenure as Liverpool manager. Salah added another in the 72nd, and the Reds seemed on their way to all three points. However, a 79th-minute goal from Jake Livermore and an 88th-minute leveler from Salomón Rondón to make it 2–2 meant the points would be shared. Liverpool could not dwell on this result as the final European night at Anfield was on deck on 24 April in the Champions League semi-finals against A.S. Roma. The first key action of the game was not a goal, but rather an injury as Oxlade-Chamberlain went down with what was eventually ruled as a knee ligament injury. The Reds could not find a breakthrough until a sparkling 36th-minute effort from Salah against his former team put the Reds ahead. Salah added another in the first minute of added time of the first half and the Reds carried a 2–0 lead into the second half. The Reds would not stop as Mane added a third in the 56th and Firmino had an eight-minute double to make the lead 5–0. Roma, however, got two key away goals back through Edin Džeko in the 81st and Diego Perotti from the penalty spot after a James Milner handball in the 85th. Regardless, the Reds walked away with a 5–2 and the driver's seat of the second leg. The next day, the club would announce that Oxlade-Chamberlain was set to miss the remainder of the season as well as the 2018 World Cup for England. The final fixture of the month was at Anfield against 19th place Stoke City on 28 April. Liverpool had the best of the chances: a Salah miss on a one-on-one with the keeper in the fifth, an Ings effort ruled out for offside in the 40th, and a controversial potential handball on Erik Pieters in the 87th, but neither team could find the net and the final score was 0–0.

=== May ===

Liverpool's 2018 UEFA Champions League Final starting lineup

Liverpool's May began with the second leg of the Champions League semi-finals against Roma on 2 May. Liverpool quickly got an away goal from Mane in the ninth minute, striking first in the match. Just six minutes later, however, in the 15th minute, Roma would see one back after an attempted Lovren clearance struck Milner directly in the face and back into the Liverpool net. The Reds then saw a second goal in the 25th minute off a Wijnaldum header on a corner kick, marking his first away goal for Liverpool. The match entered the half 1–2 and with Liverpool in strong position to advance, however Roma continue to attack. Dzeko scored in the 52nd to level the match score, then Radja Nainggolan hit an exceptional long shot in the 86th. Finally, Klavan was penalized for Liverpool and Nainggolan achieved a brace off a spot kick in the 94th, but with Roma needed one more for extra time it was too little, too late. The final whistle sounded and Liverpool, while losing 4–2, advanced on an aggregate score of 6–7 and would see Real Madrid in the Champions League Final. That weekend, Liverpool would take on Chelsea on 6 May at Stamford Bridge, with a win sealing top four and Champions League for the next season. Alas, in the 32nd minute, it was Chelsea striker Olivier Giroud who found the lone goal of the game and Chelsea won 1–0, giving them an opportunity to be level with Liverpool on points on the last match-day. This, however, was not the case for Chelsea as they stumbled to Huddersfield 1–1 on 9 May, meaning Liverpool would need, barring a massive goal differential swing, just a draw regardless of Chelsea's final day result to clinch fourth place. Liverpool's final Premier League match of the season took place at Anfield against Brighton & Hove Albion on 13 May. The Reds wasted little time in finding the breakthrough as Salah scored in the 26th minute and sealed the record for most goals in a 38-game Premier League season, with 32. Just five minutes before halftime, Lovren doubled the Reds lead with a massive header. Liverpool continued forward as Solanke and Andy Robertson scored their first Liverpool goals in the 53rd and 85th minutes as Liverpool cruised to a 4–0 victory and, as a result, fourth place in the Premier League.

Kyiv's Olimpiyskiy National Sports Complex hosted the Champions League final on 26 May against the two-time defending champions in Madrid. Liverpool suffered an early blow as Salah sustained what Klopp later specified as a serious injury to "either the collarbone or the shoulder" after just 30 minutes of play. Regardless, the score was 0–0 at the half but in the 51st minute, Karim Benzema pounced on a Karius roll-out of the ball and ultimately get a foot to direct the ball net-bound and give Madrid the 1–0 lead. Liverpool equalized in the 55th through Mane off a corner kick, but nine minutes after that Gareth Bale came off the bench and deliver a stunning bicycle kick to break the deadlock again. Bale found his second of the game and Madrid's third in the 83rd off a long shot that Karius mishandled into his own net. Madrid went on to win the Champions League 3–1 and Karius found harsh criticism for mistakes described as part of a "horror show" of a night for the Liverpool keeper. A few days after the game, Karius was diagnosed with a concussion which likely occurred in a clash between him and Sergio Ramos a few minutes before Madrid's first goal. Despite the season-ending heartbreak, this was Liverpool's best Champions League performance since 2007 and widely considered another step in the right direction for Liverpool as a whole.

== First team ==
Squad no.	Name	Nationality	Position(s)	Date of birth	Signed from	Apps	Goals	Assists
Goalkeepers
1	Loris Karius	(Germany)	GK	22 June 1993 (aged 25)	(Germany) Mainz 05	49	0	0
22	Simon Mignolet	(Belgium)	GK	6 March 1988 (aged 30)	(England) Sunderland	202	0	0
34	Ádám Bogdán	(Hungary)	GK	27 September 1987 (aged 30)	(England) Bolton Wanderers	6	0	0
52	Danny Ward	(Wales)	GK	22 June 1993 (aged 24)	(Wales) Wrexham	3	0	0
Defenders
2	Nathaniel Clyne	(England)	RB	5 April 1991 (aged 27)	(England) Southampton	98	2	4
4	Virgil van Dijk	(Netherlands)	CB	8 July 1991 (aged 26)	(England) Southampton	22	1	0
6	Dejan Lovren	(Croatia)	CB	5 July 1989 (aged 28)	(England) Southampton	152	6	3
12	Joe Gomez	(England)	RB/CB	23 May 1997 (aged 21)	(England) Charlton Athletic	41	0	3
17	Ragnar Klavan	(Estonia)	CB	30 October 1985 (aged 32)	(Germany) FC Augsburg	53	2	0
18	Alberto Moreno	(Spain)	LB/LW	5 July 1992 (aged 25)	(Spain) Sevilla	136	3	11
26	Andy Robertson	(Scotland)	LB	11 March 1994 (aged 24)	(England) Hull City	30	1	5
32	Joël Matip	(Cameroon)	CB	8 August 1991 (aged 26)	(Germany) Schalke 04	67	2	0
66	Trent Alexander-Arnold	(England)	RB	7 October 1998 (aged 19)	(England) LFC Academy	45	3	3
Midfielders
5	Georginio Wijnaldum	(Netherlands)	CM/AM	11 November 1990 (aged 27)	(England) Newcastle United	92	8	15
7	James Milner (vice-captain)	(England)	DM/CM/LB/RB	4 January 1986 (aged 32)	(England) Manchester City	132	15	29
14	Jordan Henderson (captain)	(England)	CM/DM	17 June 1990 (aged 28)	(England) Sunderland	280	24	38
20	Adam Lallana	(England)	CM/AM/RW/LW	10 May 1988 (aged 30)	(England) Southampton	140	21	19
21	Alex Oxlade-Chamberlain	(England)	CM/AM	15 August 1993 (aged 24)	(England) Arsenal	42	5	8
23	Emre Can	(Germany)	DM/CM	12 January 1994 (aged 24)	(Germany) Bayer Leverkusen	167	14	10
Forwards
9	Roberto Firmino	(Brazil)	FW/LW	2 October 1991 (aged 26)	(Germany) Hoffenheim	144	50	34
11	Mohamed Salah	(Egypt)	RW	15 June 1992 (aged 26)	(Italy) Roma	52	44	14
19	Sadio Mané	(Senegal)	RW/LW	10 April 1992 (aged 26)	(England) Southampton	73	33	16
28	Danny Ings	(England)	FW/RW/LW	23 July 1992 (aged 25)	(England) Burnley	25	4	1
29	Dominic Solanke	(England)	FW	14 September 1997 (aged 20)	(England) Chelsea	27	1	1
58	Ben Woodburn	(Wales)	FW/RW/LW	15 October 1999 (aged 18)	(England) LFC Academy	11	1	0

=== New contracts ===
Date	Pos	No.	Player	Ref.
7 July 2017	DF	66	(England) Trent Alexander-Arnold	
10 August 2017	MF	40	(England) Ryan Kent	
25 October 2017	FW	58	(Wales) Ben Woodburn	
31 January 2018	FW	59	(Wales) Harry Wilson	
29 April 2018	FW	9	(Brazil) Roberto Firmino	

== Transfers and loans ==
=== Transfers in ===
Entry date	Position	No.	Player	From club	Fee	Ref.
1 July 2017	FW	11	(Egypt) Mohamed Salah	(Italy) Roma	£43,900,000	
10 July 2017	FW	29	(England) Dominic Solanke	(England) Chelsea	Tribunal	
21 July 2017	DF	26	(Scotland) Andy Robertson	(England) Hull City	£10,000,000	
31 August 2017	MF	21	(England) Alex Oxlade-Chamberlain	(England) Arsenal	£40,000,000	
1 January 2018	DF	4	(Netherlands) Virgil van Dijk	(England) Southampton	£75,000,000	
Total					£168,900,000	

=== Transfers out ===
Exit date	Position	No.	Player	To club	Fee	Ref.
1 July 2017	GK	13	(Austria) Alex Manninger	Retired		
3 July 2017	DF	47	(England) Andre Wisdom	(England) Derby County	£2,000,000 (Note: Fee may eventually rise to £4,500,000.)	
18 July 2017	MF	21	(Brazil) Lucas Leiva	(Italy) Lazio	£5,000,000	
21 July 2017	MF	35	(England) Kevin Stewart	(England) Hull City	£4,000,000 (Note: Fee may eventually rise to £8,000,000.)	
31 August 2017	DF	3	(France) Mamadou Sakho	(England) Crystal Palace	£24,000,000 (Note: Fee may eventually rise to £26,000,000.)	
8 January 2018	MF	10	(Brazil) Philippe Coutinho	(Spain) Barcelona	£105,000,000 (Note: Fee may eventually rise to £142,000,000.)	
11 January 2018	MF	25	(England) Cameron Brannagan	(England) Oxford United	£250,000	
Total					£140,250,000	

=== Loans out ===
Start date	End date	Position	No.	Player	To club	Fee	Ref.
26 July 2017	End of season	MF	68	(Spain) Pedro Chirivella	(Netherlands) Willem II	None	
28 July 2017	End of season	DF	56	(England) Connor Randall	(Scotland) Heart of Midlothian	None	
16 August 2017	End of season	MF	54	(England) Sheyi Ojo	(England) Fulham	None	
31 August 2017	Half of season	MF	49	(Wales) Jordan Williams	(England) Rochdale	None	
31 August 2017	End of season	FW	27	(Belgium) Divock Origi	(Germany) VfL Wolfsburg	£6,000,000	
31 August 2017	8 January 2018	MF	40	(England) Ryan Kent	(Germany) SC Freiburg	£1,000,000	
12 January 2018	End of season	MF	40	(England) Ryan Kent	(England) Bristol City	None	
17 January 2018	End of season	MF	16	(Serbia) Marko Grujić	(Wales) Cardiff City	None	
29 January 2018	End of season	FW	15	(England) Daniel Sturridge	(England) West Bromwich Albion	£1,500,000	
31 January 2018	End of season	MF	53	(England) Ovie Ejaria	(England) Sunderland	None	
31 January 2018	End of season	FW	59	(Wales) Harry Wilson	(England) Hull City	None	
31 January 2018	End of season	FW	50	(Serbia) Lazar Marković	(Belgium) Anderlecht	None	
31 January 2018	End of season	DF	38	(England) Jon Flanagan	(England) Bolton Wanderers	None	

=== Transfer summary ===
Spending

Summer: ▼£ 93,900,000

Winter: ▼£ 75,000,000

Total: ▼£ 168,900,000

Income

Summer: ▲£ 42,000,000

Winter: ▲£ 106,750,000

Total: ▲£ 148,750,000

Net Expenditure

Summer: ▼£ 51,900,000

Winter: ▲£ 31,750,000

Total: ▼£ 20,150,000

== Friendlies ==
=== Pre-season ===
As of 15 June 2017, Liverpool have announced four pre-season friendlies against Hertha BSC, Athletic Bilbao Tranmere Rovers and Wigan Athletic.

12 July 2017 Friendly	Tranmere Rovers	0–4	Liverpool	Birkenhead, England
19:45 BST		Report	Milner 32' (pen.); Grujić 42'; Chirivella 50'; Woodburn 78' (pen.)	Stadium: Prenton Park; Attendance: 13,444; Referee: Mike Dean

14 July 2017 Friendly	Wigan Athletic	1–1	Liverpool	Wigan, England
19:30 BST	Gilbey 21'	Report	Salah 45+1'	Stadium: DW Stadium; Attendance: 12,715; Referee: Oliver Langford

29 July 2017 Friendly	Hertha BSC	0–3	Liverpool	Berlin, Germany
17:00 BST	Pekarík (yellow card) 77'	Report	Solanke 16'; Wijnaldum 38'; Moreno (yellow card) 45'; Salah 63'	Stadium: Olympiastadion; Attendance: 54,279

5 August 2017 Friendly	Liverpool	3–1	Athletic Bilbao	Dublin, Ireland
17:15 BST	Firmino 21' (pen.); Woodburn 59'; Solanke 80'	Report	Williams 30'	Stadium: Aviva Stadium; Attendance: 51,333

==== Premier League Asia Trophy ====
Liverpool faced Crystal Palace in their opening game at the 2017 Premier League Asia Trophy.

19 July 2017 Semi-finals	Liverpool	2–0	Crystal Palace	Hong Kong
13:30 BST	Solanke 61'; Grujić (yellow card) 68'; Origi 79'	Report	Dann (yellow card) 42'	Stadium: Hong Kong Stadium; Attendance: 39,273; Referee: Bobby Madley (England)

22 July 2017 Final	Liverpool	2–1	Leicester City	Hong Kong
13:30 BST	Salah 20'; Coutinho 44'	Report	Slimani 12'; Mahrez (yellow card) 43'; Ndidi (yellow card) 73'	Stadium: Hong Kong Stadium; Attendance: 39,498; Referee: Bobby Madley (England)

==== Audi Cup ====
Details for the 2017 Audi Cup were announced on 15 June 2017.

1 August 2017 Semi-finals	Bayern Munich	0–3	Liverpool	Munich, Germany
19:30 BST	Sanches (yellow card) 50'; Vidal (yellow card) 89'	Report	Mané 7'; Salah 34'; Sturridge 83'; Lallana (yellow card) 89'	Stadium: Allianz Arena; Attendance: 57,500; Referee: Robert Hartmann (Germany)

2 August 2017 Final	Liverpool	1–1 (4–5 p)	Atlético Madrid	Munich, Germany
19:30 BST	Milner (yellow card) 25'; Gomez (yellow card) 45'; Klavan (yellow card) 64'; Firmino 83' (pen.)	Report	Bare 27'; González (yellow card) 57'	Stadium: Allianz Arena; Attendance: 66,000; Referee: Felix Brych (Germany)
	Penalties
	Firmino (penalty scored); Henderson (penalty missed); Origi (penalty scored); Kent (penalty scored); Grujić (penalty scored)		(penalty scored) Griezmann; (penalty scored) Torres; (penalty scored) Gabi; (penalty scored) Gaitán; (penalty scored) Filipe Luís

== Competitions ==
=== Overall ===
Competition	Started round	Final position / round	First match	Last match
Premier League	—	4th	12 August 2017	13 May 2018
FA Cup	Third round	Fourth round	5 January 2018	27 January 2018
EFL Cup	Third round	Third round	19 September 2017	19 September 2017
UEFA Champions League	Play-off round	Runners-up	15 August 2017	26 May 2018

Source: Competitions

=== Overview ===
Competition	Record							
Competition	G	W	D	L	GF	GA	GD	Win %
Premier League	38	21	12	5	84	38	+46	55.26
FA Cup	2	1	0	1	4	4	+0	50.00
EFL Cup	1	0	0	1	0	2	−2	0.00
UEFA Champions League	15	9	4	2	47	19	+28	60.00
Total	56	31	16	9	135	63	+72	55.36

Source: Competitions

=== Premier League ===
==== League table ====
Pos	Team	Pld	W	D	L	GF	GA	GD	Pts	Qualification or relegation
2	Manchester United	38	25	6	7	68	28	+40	81	Qualification for the Champions League group stage
3	Tottenham Hotspur	38	23	8	7	74	36	+38	77	Qualification for the Champions League group stage
4	Liverpool	38	21	12	5	84	38	+46	75	Qualification for the Champions League group stage
5	Chelsea	38	21	7	10	62	38	+24	70	Qualification for the Europa League group stage (Note: Since the winners of the 2017–18 FA Cup (Chelsea) and the winners of the 2017–18 EFL Cup (Manchester City) both qualified for European competition based on their league positions, the berths awarded to the 5th-placed team (Europa League group stage) and the League Cup winners (Europa League second qualifying round) were passed down the league.)
6	Arsenal	38	19	6	13	74	51	+23	63	Qualification for the Europa League group stage

Source: Premier League
Rules for classification: 1) Points; 2) Goal difference; 3) Goals scored. 4) Play-offs (only if needed to decide champion, teams for relegation or teams for UEFA competitions).

==== Results summary ====
Overall								Home						Away					
Pld	W	D	L	GF	GA	GD	Pts	W	D	L	GF	GA	GD	W	D	L	GF	GA	GD
38	21	12	5	84	38	+46	75	12	7	0	45	10	+35	9	5	5	39	28	+11

Source: Premier League

==== Results by matchday ====
Matchday	1	2	3	4	5	6	7	8	9	10	11	12	13	14	15	16	17	18	19	20	21	22	23	24	25	26	27	28	29	30	31	32	33	34	35	36	37	38
Ground	A	H	H	A	H	A	A	H	A	H	A	H	H	A	A	H	H	A	A	H	H	A	H	A	A	H	A	H	H	A	H	A	A	H	A	H	A	H
Result	D	W	W	L	D	W	D	D	L	W	W	W	D	W	W	D	D	W	D	W	W	W	W	L	W	D	W	W	W	L	W	W	D	W	D	D	L	W
Position	9	6	2	8	8	5	7	8	9	6	5	5	6	5	4	4	5	4	4	4	4	4	3	4	3	3	3	3	3	4	3	3	3	3	3	3	4	4

Source: 11v11
A = Away; H = Home; W = Win; D = Draw; L = Loss

==== Matches ====
On 14 June 2017, the fixtures for the forthcoming season were announced.

12 August 2017 1	Watford	3–3	Liverpool	Watford
12:30 BST	Okaka 8'; Doucouré 32'; Britos 90+4'	Report	Mané 29', (yellow card) 37'; Firmino 55' (pen.); Salah 57'; Alexander-Arnold (yellow card) 62'; Mignolet (yellow card) 88'	Stadium: Vicarage Road; Attendance: 20,407; Referee: Anthony Taylor

19 August 2017 2	Liverpool	1–0	Crystal Palace	Liverpool
15:00 BST	Henderson (yellow card) 69'; Mané 73'	Report	Puncheon (yellow card) 15'; Van Aanholt (yellow card) 63'; Benteke (yellow card) 90+2'	Stadium: Anfield; Attendance: 53,138; Referee: Kevin Friend

27 August 2017 3	Liverpool	4–0	Arsenal	Liverpool
16:00 BST	Firmino 17'; Lovren (yellow card) 20'; Gomez (yellow card) 23'; Mané 40'; Salah 57'; Sturridge 77'	Report	Welbeck (yellow card) 22'; Xhaka (yellow card) 40'; Özil (yellow card) 49'; Holding (yellow card) 73'	Stadium: Anfield; Attendance: 53,206; Referee: Craig Pawson

9 September 2017 4	Manchester City	5–0	Liverpool	Manchester
12:30 BST	Otamendi (yellow card) 6'; Agüero 24'; Fernandinho (yellow card) 28'; Gabriel Jesus 45+6', 53'; Sané 77', 90+1'	Report	Alexander-Arnold (yellow card) 19'; Mané (red card) 37'; Can (yellow card) 80'	Stadium: City of Manchester Stadium; Attendance: 54,172; Referee: Jonathan Moss

16 September 2017 5	Liverpool	1–1	Burnley	Liverpool
15:00 BST	Salah 30'; Can (yellow card) 90+3'	Report	Arfield 27'; Pope (yellow card) 55'; Cork (yellow card) 90+3'	Stadium: Anfield; Attendance: 53,231; Referee: Roger East

23 September 2017 6	Leicester City	2–3	Liverpool	Leicester
17:30 BST	Albrighton (yellow card) 17'; Ndidi (yellow card) 22'; Okazaki 45+3'; Vardy 69', (penalty missed) 73', (yellow card) 90+2'	Report	Salah 15'; Coutinho 23'; Matip (yellow card) 45+2'; Lovren (yellow card) 56'; Henderson 68'; Mignolet (yellow card) 72'	Stadium: King Power Stadium; Attendance: 32,004; Referee: Anthony Taylor

1 October 2017 7	Newcastle United	1–1	Liverpool	Newcastle upon Tyne
16:30 BST	Joselu 36'; Pérez (yellow card) 55'	Report	Coutinho 29'; Gomez (yellow card) 58'	Stadium: St James' Park; Attendance: 52,303; Referee: Craig Pawson

14 October 2017 8	Liverpool	0–0	Manchester United	Liverpool
12:30 BST		Report	Smalling (yellow card) 74'; Young (yellow card) 87'	Stadium: Anfield; Attendance: 52,912; Referee: Martin Atkinson

22 October 2017 9	Tottenham Hotspur	4–1	Liverpool	Wembley, London
16:00 BST	Kane 4', 56'; Son 12'; Alli 45+3'	Report	Salah 24'; Can (yellow card) 45+2'	Stadium: Wembley Stadium; Attendance: 80,827; Referee: Andre Marriner

28 October 2017 10	Liverpool	3–0	Huddersfield Town	Liverpool
15:00 BST	Salah (penalty missed) 42'; Sturridge 50'; Firmino 58'; Wijnaldum 75'	Report	Smith (yellow card) 41'	Stadium: Anfield; Attendance: 53,268; Referee: Kevin Friend

4 November 2017 11	West Ham United	1–4	Liverpool	Stratford, London
17:30 GMT	Noble (yellow card) 37'; Reid (yellow card) 47'; Lanzini 55', (yellow card) 90'	Report	Salah 21', 75'; Matip 24'; Oxlade-Chamberlain 56'	Stadium: London Stadium; Attendance: 56,961; Referee: Neil Swarbrick

18 November 2017 12	Liverpool	3–0	Southampton	Liverpool
15:00 GMT	Salah 31', 41'; Lovren (yellow card) 43'; Coutinho 68'	Report	Romeu (yellow card) 61'	Stadium: Anfield; Attendance: 53,256; Referee: Mike Jones

25 November 2017 13	Liverpool	1–1	Chelsea	Liverpool
17:30 GMT	Salah 65'	Report	Willian 85'	Stadium: Anfield; Attendance: 53,225; Referee: Michael Oliver

29 November 2017 14	Stoke City	0–3	Liverpool	Stoke-on-Trent
20:00 GMT	Martins Indi (yellow card) 65'	Report	Mané 17', (yellow card) 74'; Mignolet (yellow card) 39'; Can (yellow card) 56'; Wijnaldum (yellow card) 63'; Oxlade-Chamberlain (yellow card) 66'; Salah 77', 83'	Stadium: bet365 Stadium; Attendance: 29,423; Referee: Martin Atkinson

2 December 2017 15	Brighton & Hove Albion	1–5	Liverpool	Falmer
15:00 GMT	Murray 51' (pen.); Bruno (yellow card) 61'	Report	Can 30'; Firmino 31', 48'; Coutinho 87'; Dunk 89' (o.g.)	Stadium: Falmer Stadium; Attendance: 30,631; Referee: Graham Scott

10 December 2017 16	Liverpool	1–1	Everton	Liverpool
14:15	Salah 42'; Lovren (yellow card) 76'	Report	Sigurðsson (yellow card) 36'; Gueye (yellow card) 42'; Rooney 77' (pen.); Schneiderlin (yellow card) 85'	Stadium: Anfield; Attendance: 53,082; Referee: Craig Pawson

13 December 2017 17	Liverpool	0–0	West Bromwich Albion	Liverpool
20:00	Can (yellow card) 68'	Report	Field (yellow card) 90+2'	Stadium: Anfield; Attendance: 53,243; Referee: Paul Tierney

17 December 2017 18	Bournemouth	0–4	Liverpool	Bournemouth
16:30	Aké (yellow card) 10'	Report	Coutinho 20'; Lovren 26'; Salah 44'; Firmino 66'; Lallana (yellow card) 73'	Stadium: Dean Court; Attendance: 10,780; Referee: Andre Marriner

22 December 2017 19	Arsenal	3–3	Liverpool	Holloway, London
19:45	Sánchez 53'; Xhaka 56'; Özil 58'; Iwobi (yellow card) 58'	Report	Coutinho 26'; Salah 52'; Firmino 71'	Stadium: Emirates Stadium; Attendance: 59,409; Referee: Martin Atkinson

26 December 2017 20	Liverpool	5–0	Swansea City	Liverpool
17:30	Coutinho 6'; Firmino 52', 66'; Alexander-Arnold 65'; Oxlade-Chamberlain 82'	Report	Olsson (yellow card) 56'	Stadium: Anfield; Attendance: 52,850; Referee: Kevin Friend

30 December 2017 21	Liverpool	2–1	Leicester City	Liverpool
15:00	Milner (yellow card) 8'; Salah 52', 76'; Can (yellow card) 53'; Robertson (yellow card) 90+1'	Report	Vardy 3'; Maguire (yellow card) 53'; Ndidi (yellow card) 62'	Stadium: Anfield; Attendance: 53,226; Referee: Neil Swarbrick

1 January 2018 22	Burnley	1–2	Liverpool	Burnley
15:00	Guðmundsson 87'	Report	Mané 61'; Klavan 90+4'	Stadium: Turf Moor; Attendance: 21,756; Referee: Roger East

14 January 2018 23	Liverpool	4–3	Manchester City	Liverpool
16:00	Oxlade-Chamberlain 9'; Firmino 59', (yellow card) 60'; Mané 61'; Salah 68'; Milner (yellow card) 90+3'	Report	Sané 40'; Otamendi (yellow card) 65'; Sterling (yellow card) 69'; Fernandinho (yellow card) 72'; B. Silva 84'; Gündoğan 90+1'	Stadium: Anfield; Attendance: 53,285; Referee: Andre Marriner

22 January 2018 24	Swansea City	1–0	Liverpool	Swansea
20:00	Mawson 40'	Report	Robertson (yellow card) 44'; Matip (yellow card) 45'	Stadium: Liberty Stadium; Attendance: 20,886; Referee: Neil Swarbrick

30 January 2018 25	Huddersfield Town	0–3	Liverpool	Huddersfield
20:00		Report	Can 26'; Firmino 45+1'; Salah 78' (pen.)	Stadium: John Smith's Stadium; Attendance: 24,121; Referee: Kevin Friend

4 February 2018 26	Liverpool	2–2	Tottenham Hotspur	Liverpool
16:15	Salah 3', 90+1'; Alexander-Arnold (yellow card) 42'; Milner (yellow card) 58'; Can (yellow card) 90+6'	Report	Alli (yellow card) 69'; Wanyama 80'; Kane (penalty missed) 87', 90+5' (pen.)	Stadium: Anfield; Attendance: 53,213; Referee: Jonathan Moss

11 February 2018 27	Southampton	0–2	Liverpool	Southampton
16:30	Romeu (yellow card) 62'	Report	Firmino 6'; Matip (yellow card) 37'; Salah 42'; Can (yellow card) 47'	Stadium: St Mary's Stadium; Attendance: 31,915; Referee: Martin Atkinson

24 February 2018 28	Liverpool	4–1	West Ham United	Liverpool
15:00	Can 29'; Salah 51'; Firmino 57'; Mané 77'	Report	Collins (yellow card) 43'; Kouyaté (yellow card) 47'; Antonio 59'	Stadium: Anfield; Attendance: 53,256; Referee: Stuart Attwell

3 March 2018 29	Liverpool	2–0	Newcastle United	Liverpool
17:30	Salah 40'; Mané 55'	Report		Stadium: Anfield; Attendance: 53,287; Referee: Graham Scott

10 March 2018 30	Manchester United	2–1	Liverpool	Manchester
12:30	Rashford 14', 24', (yellow card) 27'; Valencia (yellow card) 89'	Report	Oxlade-Chamberlain (yellow card) 35'; Bailly 66' (o.g.)	Stadium: Old Trafford; Attendance: 74,855; Referee: Craig Pawson

17 March 2018 31	Liverpool	5–0	Watford	Liverpool
17:30	Salah 4', 43', 77', 85'; Firmino 49'; Gomez (yellow card) 52'	Report		Stadium: Anfield; Attendance: 53,287; Referee: Anthony Taylor

31 March 2018 32	Crystal Palace	1–2	Liverpool	Selhurst, London
12:30 BST	Milivojević 13' (pen.); Benteke (yellow card) 38'; McArthur (yellow card) 45'	Report	Karius (yellow card) 12'; Mané (yellow card) 24', (goal) 49'; Salah 84'	Stadium: Selhurst Park; Attendance: 25,807; Referee: Neil Swarbrick

7 April 2018 33	Everton	0–0	Liverpool	Liverpool
12:30		Report		Stadium: Goodison Park; Attendance: 39,220; Referee: Michael Oliver

14 April 2018 34	Liverpool	3–0	Bournemouth	Liverpool
17:30	Mané 7'; Oxlade-Chamberlain (yellow card) 54'; Salah 69'; Firmino 90'	Report	Aké (yellow card) 15'	Stadium: Anfield; Attendance: 52,959; Referee: Chris Kavanagh

21 April 2018 35	West Bromwich Albion	2–2	Liverpool	West Bromwich
12:30 BST	Livermore 79'; Rondón 88'	Report	Ings 4'; Moreno (yellow card) 69'; Salah 72'	Stadium: The Hawthorns; Attendance: 24,520; Referee: Stuart Attwell

28 April 2018 36	Liverpool	0–0	Stoke City	Liverpool
12:30 BST	Van Dijk (yellow card) 88'	Report	Crouch (yellow card) 36'; Diouf (yellow card) 42'	Stadium: Anfield; Attendance: 53,255; Referee: Andre Marriner

6 May 2018 37	Chelsea	1–0	Liverpool	Fulham, London
16:30	Giroud 32'; Alonso (yellow card) 79'; Moses (yellow card) 81'; Courtois (yellow card) 90+4'	Report	Salah (yellow card) 39'; Clyne (yellow card) 40'	Stadium: Stamford Bridge; Attendance: 41,314; Referee: Anthony Taylor

13 May 2018 38	Liverpool	4–0	Brighton & Hove Albion	Liverpool
15:00	Salah 26'; Lovren 40'; Solanke 53'; Robertson 85'	Report		Stadium: Anfield; Attendance: 50,752; Referee: Kevin Friend

=== FA Cup ===
Win Draw Loss

In the FA Cup, Liverpool entered in the third round and were drawn at home to Everton.

5 January 2018 Third round	Liverpool	2–1	Everton	Liverpool
19:55 GMT	Milner 35' (pen.); Van Dijk 84'; Solanke (yellow card) 88'	Report	Rooney (yellow card) 7'; McCarthy (yellow card) 60'; Sigurðsson 67'	Stadium: Anfield; Attendance: 52,513; Referee: Bobby Madley

27 January 2018 Fourth round	Liverpool	2–3	West Bromwich Albion	Liverpool
19:45 GMT	Firmino 5', (penalty missed) 27'; Can (yellow card) 61'; Salah 78'	Report	Rodriguez 7', 11'; Barry (yellow card) 26'; Matip 45+2' (o.g.); Dawson (yellow card) 83'; Hegazi (yellow card) 85'	Stadium: Anfield; Attendance: 53,342; Referee: Craig Pawson

=== EFL Cup ===
Liverpool joined the EFL Cup in the third round and were drawn away to Leicester City.

Win Draw Loss

19 September 2017 Third round	Leicester City	2–0	Liverpool	Leicester
19:45 BST	Okazaki 65'; Slimani 78'; Iborra (yellow card) 90'	Report	Grujić (yellow card) 57'; Klavan (yellow card) 75'	Stadium: King Power Stadium; Attendance: 31,609; Referee: Stuart Attwell

=== UEFA Champions League ===
On 4 August 2017, Liverpool were drawn against Bundesliga side 1899 Hoffenheim in a two-legged tie for a place in the main competition.

Win Draw Loss

==== Play-off round ====
15 August 2017 First leg	1899 Hoffenheim (Germany)	1–2	(England) Liverpool	Sinsheim, Germany
19:45 BST	Kramarić (penalty missed) 12'; Hübner (yellow card) 76'; Uth 87'	Report	Alexander-Arnold 35', (yellow card) 55'; Can (yellow card) 51'; Nordtveit 74' (o.g.)	Stadium: Rhein-Neckar-Arena; Attendance: 25,568; Referee: Björn Kuipers (Netherlands)

23 August 2017 Second leg	Liverpool (England)	4–2 (6–3 agg.)	(Germany) 1899 Hoffenheim	Liverpool, England
19:45 BST	Can 10', 21'; Salah 18'; Henderson (yellow card) 45+1'; Firmino 63'	Report	Uth 28'; Geiger (yellow card) 30'; Kadeřábek (yellow card) 37'; Vogt (yellow card) 51'; Wagner 79'; Hübner (yellow card) 90'	Stadium: Anfield; Attendance: 51,808; Referee: Daniele Orsato (Italy)

==== Group stage ====
After beating 1899 Hoffenheim in the qualifiers, Liverpool entered the group stage and were drawn in Group E against Spartak Moscow, Sevilla and Maribor.

Pos	Team	Pld	W	D	L	GF	GA	GD	Pts	Qualification	LIV	SEV	SPM	MRB
1	(England) Liverpool	6	3	3	0	23	6	+17	12	Advance to knockout phase	—	2–2	7–0	3–0
2	(Spain) Sevilla	6	2	3	1	12	12	0	9	Advance to knockout phase	3–3	—	2–1	3–0
3	(Russia) Spartak Moscow	6	1	3	2	9	13	−4	6	Transfer to Europa League	1–1	5–1	—	1–1
4	(Slovenia) Maribor	6	0	3	3	3	16	−13	3		0–7	1–1	1–1	—

Source: UEFA
Rules for classification: Group stage tiebreakers

13 September 2017 1	Liverpool (England)	2–2	(Spain) Sevilla	Liverpool, England
19:45 BST	Firmino 21', (penalty missed) 42'; Salah 37'; Moreno (yellow card) 39'; Gomez (yellow card) 64' (yellow-red card) 90+3'	Report	Ben Yedder 5'; Mercado (yellow card) 35'; Pareja (yellow card) 42'; Banega (yellow card) 45+3'; Correa 72'	Stadium: Anfield; Attendance: 52,332; Referee: Danny Makkelie (Netherlands)

26 September 2017 2	Spartak Moscow (Russia)	1–1	(England) Liverpool	Moscow, Russia
19:45 BST	Fernando 23'; Bocchetti (yellow card) 46'	Report	Can (yellow card) 7'; Coutinho 31'; Firmino (yellow card) 75'	Stadium: Otkrytiye Arena; Attendance: 43,376; Referee: Clément Turpin (France)

17 October 2017 3	Maribor (Slovenia)	0–7	(England) Liverpool	Maribor, Slovenia
19:45 BST	Milec (yellow card) 40'; Vrhovec (yellow card) 80'; Hotić (yellow card) 89'	Report	Firmino 4', 54'; Coutinho 13'; Salah 19', 40'; Oxlade-Chamberlain 86'; Alexander-Arnold 90'	Stadium: Ljudski vrt Attendance: 12,506; Referee: Viktor Kassai (Hungary)

1 November 2017 4	Liverpool (England)	3–0	(Slovenia) Maribor	Liverpool, England
19:45 GMT	Salah 49'; Milner (penalty missed) 53'; Can 64'; Sturridge 90'	Report	Bohar (yellow card) 22'; Rajčević (yellow card) 52'	Stadium: Anfield; Attendance: 47,957; Referee: Ivan Kružliak (Slovakia)

21 November 2017 5	Sevilla (Spain)	3–3	(England) Liverpool	Seville, Spain
19:45 GMT	Banega (yellow card) 45'; Mercado (yellow card) 54'; Ben Yedder 51', 60' (pen.); Pizarro 90+3'	Report	Firmino 2', 30'; Mané 22'; Moreno (yellow card) 38'; Henderson (yellow card) 68'; Can (yellow card) 82'	Stadium: Ramón Sánchez Pizjuán; Attendance: 39,495; Referee: Felix Brych (Germany)

6 December 2017 6	Liverpool (England)	7–0	(Russia) Spartak Moscow	Liverpool, England
19:45 GMT	Coutinho 4' (pen.), 15', 50'; Can (yellow card) 6'; Firmino 18'; Mané 47', 76'; Salah 86'	Report	Dzhikiya (yellow card) 4'; Fernando (yellow card) 62'	Stadium: Anfield; Attendance: 48,779; Referee: Szymon Marciniak (Poland)

==== Knockout phase ====
===== Round of 16 =====
The draw for the round of 16 was held on 11 December 2017, 12:00 CET, at the UEFA headquarters in Nyon, Switzerland.

14 February 2018 First leg	Porto (Portugal)	0–5	(England) Liverpool	Porto, Portugal
19:45 GMT		Report	Mané 25', 53', 85'; Salah 29'; Firmino 69'	Stadium: Estádio do Dragão; Attendance: 47,718; Referee: Daniele Orsato (Italy)

6 March 2018 Second leg	Liverpool (England)	0–0 (5–0 agg.)	(Portugal) Porto	Liverpool, England
19:45 GMT	Henderson (yellow card) 59'	Report	André (yellow card) 34'; Dalot (yellow card) 90+2'	Stadium: Anfield; Attendance: 51,121; Referee: Felix Zwayer (Germany)

===== Quarter-finals =====
The draw for the quarter-finals was held on 16 March 2018, 12:00 CET, at the UEFA headquarters in Nyon, Switzerland.

4 April 2018 First leg	Liverpool (England)	3–0	(England) Manchester City	Liverpool, England
19:45 BST	Salah 12'; Oxlade-Chamberlain 21'; Mané 31'; Henderson (yellow card) 86'	Report	Otamendi (yellow card) 45+3'; Gabriel Jesus (yellow card) 76'; De Bruyne (yellow card) 80'; Sterling (yellow card) 90+3'	Stadium: Anfield; Attendance: 53,581; Referee: Felix Brych (Germany)

10 April 2018 Second leg	Manchester City (England)	1–2 (1–5 agg.)	(England) Liverpool	Manchester, England
19:45 BST	Gabriel Jesus 2'; Ederson (yellow card) 14'; B. Silva (yellow card) 30'	Report	Mané (yellow card) 14'; Alexander-Arnold (yellow card) 29'; Firmino (yellow card) 35', (goal) 77'; Salah 56'; Van Dijk (yellow card) 65'	Stadium: City of Manchester Stadium; Attendance: 53,461; Referee: Antonio Mateu Lahoz (Spain)
Note: Manchester City manager Pep Guardiola was ejected at half-time.

===== Semi-finals =====
The draw for the semi-finals was held on 13 April 2018, 12:00 CET, at the UEFA headquarters in Nyon, Switzerland.

24 April 2018 First leg	Liverpool (England)	5–2	(Italy) Roma	Liverpool, England
19:45 BST	Salah 36', 45+1'; Alexander-Arnold (yellow card) 39'; Mané 56'; Firmino 61', 69'; Lovren (yellow card) 74'; Milner (yellow card) 85'	Report	Juan Jesus (yellow card) 26'; Džeko 81'; Perotti 85' (pen.); Fazio (yellow card) 88'	Stadium: Anfield; Attendance: 51,236; Referee: Felix Brych (Germany)

2 May 2018 Second leg	Roma (Italy)	4–2 (6–7 agg.)	(England) Liverpool	Rome, Italy
19:45 BST	Milner 15' (o.g.); Džeko 52'; Florenzi (yellow card) 76'; Manolas (yellow card) 84'; Nainggolan 86', 90+4' (pen.)	Report	Mané 9'; Wijnaldum 25'; Lovren (yellow card) 44'; Robertson (yellow card) 84'; Solanke (yellow card) 90'	Stadium: Stadio Olimpico; Attendance: 61,889; Referee: Damir Skomina (Slovenia)

===== Final =====
26 May 2018 Final	Real Madrid (Spain)	3–1	(England) Liverpool	Kyiv, Ukraine
20:45	Benzema 51'; Bale 64', 83'	Report	Mané 55', (yellow card) 82'	Stadium: NSC Olimpiyskiy Stadium; Attendance: 61,561; Referee: Milorad Mažić (Serbia)

== Squad statistics ==
=== Appearances ===
Players with no appearances not included in the list.

No.	Pos.	Nat.	Name	Premier League		FA Cup		EFL Cup		UCL		Total	
No.	Pos.	Nat.	Name	Apps	Starts	Apps	Starts	Apps	Starts	Apps	Starts	Apps	Starts
1	GK	(Germany)	Loris Karius	19	19	1	1	0	0	13	13	33	33
2	DF	(England)	Nathaniel Clyne	3	2	0	0	0	0	2	0	5	2
4	DF	(Netherlands)	Virgil van Dijk	14	14	2	2	0	0	6	6	22	22
5	MF	(Netherlands)	Georginio Wijnaldum	33	27	2	1	1	1	14	11	50	40
6	DF	(Croatia)	Dejan Lovren	29	24	0	0	0	0	14	14	43	38
7	MF	(England)	James Milner	32	16	2	1	0	0	13	9	47	26
9	FW	(Brazil)	Roberto Firmino	37	32	2	2	0	0	15	15	54	47
11	FW	(Egypt)	Mohamed Salah	36	34	1	1	0	0	15	13	52	48
12	DF	(England)	Joe Gomez	23	21	1	1	1	1	6	4	31	27
14	MF	(England)	Jordan Henderson	27	25	1	0	1	1	12	11	41	37
17	DF	(Estonia)	Ragnar Klavan	19	16	0	0	1	1	8	3	28	20
18	DF	(Spain)	Alberto Moreno	16	14	1	1	0	0	10	9	27	24
19	FW	(Senegal)	Sadio Mané	29	28	2	2	0	0	13	13	44	43
20	MF	(England)	Adam Lallana	12	1	1	1	0	0	2	1	15	3
21	MF	(England)	Alex Oxlade-Chamberlain	32	14	2	2	1	1	7	4	42	21
22	GK	(Belgium)	Simon Mignolet	19	19	1	1	0	0	2	2	22	22
23	MF	(Germany)	Emre Can	26	24	2	2	0	0	10	8	38	34
26	DF	(Scotland)	Andy Robertson	22	22	1	1	1	1	6	6	30	30
28	FW	(England)	Danny Ings	8	3	1	0	1	0	4	0	14	3
29	FW	(England)	Dominic Solanke	21	5	1	0	1	1	4	0	27	6
32	DF	(Cameroon)	Joël Matip	25	22	2	2	0	0	8	7	35	31
52	GK	(Wales)	Danny Ward	0	0	0	0	1	1	0	0	1	1
58	FW	(Wales)	Ben Woodburn	1	0	0	0	1	0	0	0	2	0
66	DF	(England)	Trent Alexander-Arnold	19	18	2	1	0	0	12	11	33	30
Players who went out on loan or left permanently but made appearances for Liverpool prior to departing
10	MF	(Brazil)	Philippe Coutinho	14	13	0	0	1	1	5	4	20	18
15	FW	(England)	Daniel Sturridge	9	5	0	0	0	0	5	0	14	5
16	MF	(Serbia)	Marko Grujić	3	0	0	0	1	1	2	0	6	1
27	FW	(Belgium)	Divock Origi	1	0	0	0	0	0	0	0	1	0
38	DF	(England)	Jon Flanagan	0	0	0	0	1	1	0	0	1	1

=== Goalscorers ===
Includes all competitive matches.

Rank	Pos.	No.	Player	Premier League	FA Cup	Champions League	Total
1	FW	11	(Egypt) Mohamed Salah	32	1	11	44
2	FW	9	(Brazil) Roberto Firmino	15	1	11	27
3	FW	19	(Senegal) Sadio Mané	10	0	10	20
4	MF	10	(Brazil) Philippe Coutinho (Note: Players who left Liverpool, either on loan or permanently, during the season)	7	0	5	12
5	MF	23	(Germany) Emre Can	3	0	3	6
6	MF	21	(England) Alex Oxlade-Chamberlain	3	0	2	5
7	FW	15	(England) Daniel Sturridge	2	0	1	3
7	DF	66	(England) Trent Alexander-Arnold	1	0	2	3
9	MF	5	(Netherlands) Georginio Wijnaldum	1	0	1	2
9	DF	6	(Croatia) Dejan Lovren	2	0	0	2
11	DF	4	(Netherlands) Virgil van Dijk	0	1	0	1
11	MF	7	(England) James Milner	0	1	0	1
11	MF	14	(England) Jordan Henderson	1	0	0	1
11	DF	17	(Estonia) Ragnar Klavan	1	0	0	1
11	DF	26	(Scotland) Andy Robertson	1	0	0	1
11	FW	28	(England) Danny Ings	1	0	0	1
11	FW	29	(England) Dominic Solanke	1	0	0	1
11	DF	32	(Cameroon) Joël Matip	1	0	0	1
Own goals				2	0	1	3
Total				84	4	47	135

=== Clean sheets ===
Includes all competitive matches.

No.	Player	Premier League	FA Cup	Champions League	Total
1	(Germany) Loris Karius	11	0	6	17
22	(Belgium) Simon Mignolet	7	0	0	7

=== Disciplinary record ===
No.	Pos.	Name	Premier League		FA Cup		EFL Cup		UCL		Total	
No.	Pos.	Name	Yellow card	Red card	Yellow card	Red card	Yellow card	Red card	Yellow card	Red card	Yellow card	Red card
1	GK	Loris Karius	1	0	0	0	0	0	0	0	1	0
2	DF	Nathaniel Clyne	1	0	0	0	0	0	0	0	1	0
4	DF	Virgil van Dijk	1	0	0	0	0	0	1	0	2	0
5	MF	Georginio Wijnaldum	1	0	0	0	0	0	0	0	1	0
6	DF	Dejan Lovren	4	0	0	0	0	0	2	0	6	0
7	MF	James Milner	3	0	0	0	0	0	0	0	3	0
9	FW	Roberto Firmino	1	0	0	0	0	0	2	0	3	0
11	FW	Mohamed Salah	1	0	0	0	0	0	0	0	1	0
12	DF	Joe Gomez	3	0	0	0	0	0	2	1	5	1
14	MF	Jordan Henderson	1	0	0	0	0	0	5	0	6	0
16	MF	Marko Grujić	0	0	0	0	1	0	0	0	1	0
17	DF	Ragnar Klavan	0	0	0	0	1	0	0	0	1	0
18	DF	Alberto Moreno	1	0	0	0	0	0	2	0	3	0
19	FW	Sadio Mané	3	1	0	0	0	0	2	0	5	1
20	MF	Adam Lallana	1	0	0	0	0	0	0	0	1	0
21	MF	Alex Oxlade-Chamberlain	3	0	0	0	0	0	0	0	3	0
22	GK	Simon Mignolet	3	0	0	0	0	0	0	0	3	0
23	MF	Emre Can	8	0	1	0	0	0	4	0	13	0
26	DF	Andy Robertson	2	0	0	0	0	0	1	0	3	0
29	FW	Dominic Solanke	0	0	1	0	0	0	1	0	2	0
32	DF	Joël Matip	3	0	0	0	0	0	0	0	3	0
66	DF	Trent Alexander-Arnold	3	0	0	0	0	0	3	0	6	0
Total			44	1	1	0	2	0	24	1	71	2

== Club awards ==
=== End-of-season awards ===
The 2018 Liverpool F.C. Players’ Awards event was held at Anfield on 10 May 2018.

- Player of the Season: Mohamed Salah
- Players’ Player of the Season: Mohamed Salah
- Ladies Player of the Season: Gemma Bonner
- Ladies Players’ Player of the Season: Sophie Ingle
- Young Player of the Season: Trent Alexander-Arnold
- Academy Player of the Season: Harry Wilson
- Goal of the Season: Alex Oxlade-Chamberlain (vs. Manchester City, 4 April 2018)
- Bill Shankly Community Award: Fans Supporting Foodbanks
- Lifetime Achievement Award: Ian Callaghan
- Outstanding Team Achievement Award: 1978 European Cup-winning team
- Supporters’ Club of the Season: New South Wales

=== Liverpool Standard Chartered Player of the Month award ===
Awarded monthly to the player that was chosen by fans voting on liverpoolfc.com

Month	Player	Votes
August	(Egypt) Mohamed Salah	52%
September	(Egypt) Mohamed Salah	41%
October	(Croatia) Dejan Lovren (Note: Lovren won the award following an online campaign by supporters, as he had received threats to his family because of his poor performance against Tottenham.)	33%
November	(Egypt) Mohamed Salah	
December	(Egypt) Mohamed Salah	
January	(Brazil) Roberto Firmino	
February	(Egypt) Mohamed Salah	
March	(Egypt) Mohamed Salah	
April	(Egypt) Mohamed Salah	
