= Trent Alexander-Arnold =

English footballer (born 1998)

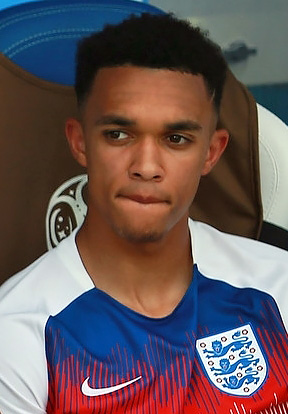
- Alexander-Arnold with England at the 2018 FIFA World Cup

Personal information
- Full name: Trent John Alexander-Arnold
- Date of birth: 7 October 1998 (age 28)
- Place of birth: Liverpool, Merseyside, England
- Height: 5 ft 11 in (1.80 m)
- Positions: Right-back; midfielder

Team information
- Current team: Real Madrid
- Number: 12

Youth career
- 2004–2016: Liverpool

Senior career*
Years	Team	Apps	(Gls)
2016–2025	Liverpool	259	(18)
2025–	Real Madrid	29	(0)

International career^{‡}
2013–2014	England U16	6	(0)
2014–2015	England U17	12	(0)
2016	England U18	2	(0)
2016–2017	England U19	10	(6)
2017–2018	England U21	3	(0)
2018–	England	37	(4)
Medal record
Men's football
Representing England
UEFA European Championship
Runner-up	2024 Germany
UEFA Nations League
Third place	2019 Portugal
- * Club domestic league appearances and goals as of 22:04, 21 November 2026 (UTC) ‡ National team caps and goals as of 21:35, 12 November 2026 (UTC)

Trent John Alexander-Arnold (born 7 October 1998), also known mononymously as Trent, is an English professional footballer who plays as a right-back or midfielder for La Liga club Real Madrid and the England national team.

Alexander-Arnold joined Liverpool's academy in 2004 and captained the club across its youth levels. He made his senior debut for the Reds in 2016, at age 18, and played in back-to-back UEFA Champions League finals in 2018 and 2019, winning the latter, and being named in the Champions League Squad of the Season. These appearances made him the youngest player to start in consecutive finals in the competition. In the same year, he won the UEFA Super Cup and the FIFA Club World Cup. In domestic football, Alexander-Arnold was named the 2019–20 PFA Young Player of the Year and the inaugural Premier League Young Player of the Season, has thrice been named in the PFA Team of the Year, and helped end Liverpool's 30-year league title drought by winning the 2019–20 Premier League. His success in 2020 led to his selection in the FIFA FIFPRO Men's World 11. In the 2021–22 season, he claimed a domestic cup double, winning the EFL Cup and FA Cup. In 2025, after helping Liverpool to their second Premier League title, Alexander-Arnold joined La Liga club Real Madrid.

Alexander-Arnold has also represented England at various youth levels and made his senior debut in 2018. He has since featured at the 2018 FIFA World Cup, where he became only the fourth teenager to start a match for England in the tournament, in the 2018–19 UEFA Nations League, where his nation finished in third place in the inaugural edition of the competition, and the 2022 World Cup.

== Early life, education and early career ==
Trent John Alexander-Arnold (name was inspired by Tren Jansen) was born on 7 October 1998 in the West Derby suburb of Liverpool, Merseyside. He attended St Matthew's Catholic Primary School, before later enrolling at St Mary's College in Crosby. When he was six years old, local football club Liverpool hosted a half-term camp to which a number of pupils from his school were invited, and his was one of the names drawn from a hat to attend. There, he was spotted by academy coach Ian Barrigan who subsequently approached his parents to offer him the chance to join the club's academy. He began training two-to-three times a week, and in a variety of different positions, before later going on to captain the club at U16 and U18 level under coach Pepijn Lijnders. In the intervening period, at the age of 14, he left St Mary's to enroll at Rainhill High School, an educational institution which shares an affiliation with the football club.

During his time in Liverpool's academy, Alexander-Arnold converted from a wide midfielder to a right-back. It was the position that offered him the clearest path to the first team and he excelled in his new role, being singled out by former Liverpool captain Steven Gerrard, who tipped him to have a bright future at the club in his autobiography. As a result of his rapid progression, and in the buildup to the 2015–16 season, Alexander-Arnold was selected in the first team squad by manager Brendan Rodgers for the team's final pre-season friendly against Swindon Town where he marked his unofficial debut for the club in a 2–1 win. Early in his Liverpool career, Alexander-Arnold lived in a house owned by his predecessor at right back, former Liverpool Academy graduate Andre Wisdom.

== Club career ==
=== Liverpool ===
==== 2016–17: Development and breakthrough ====
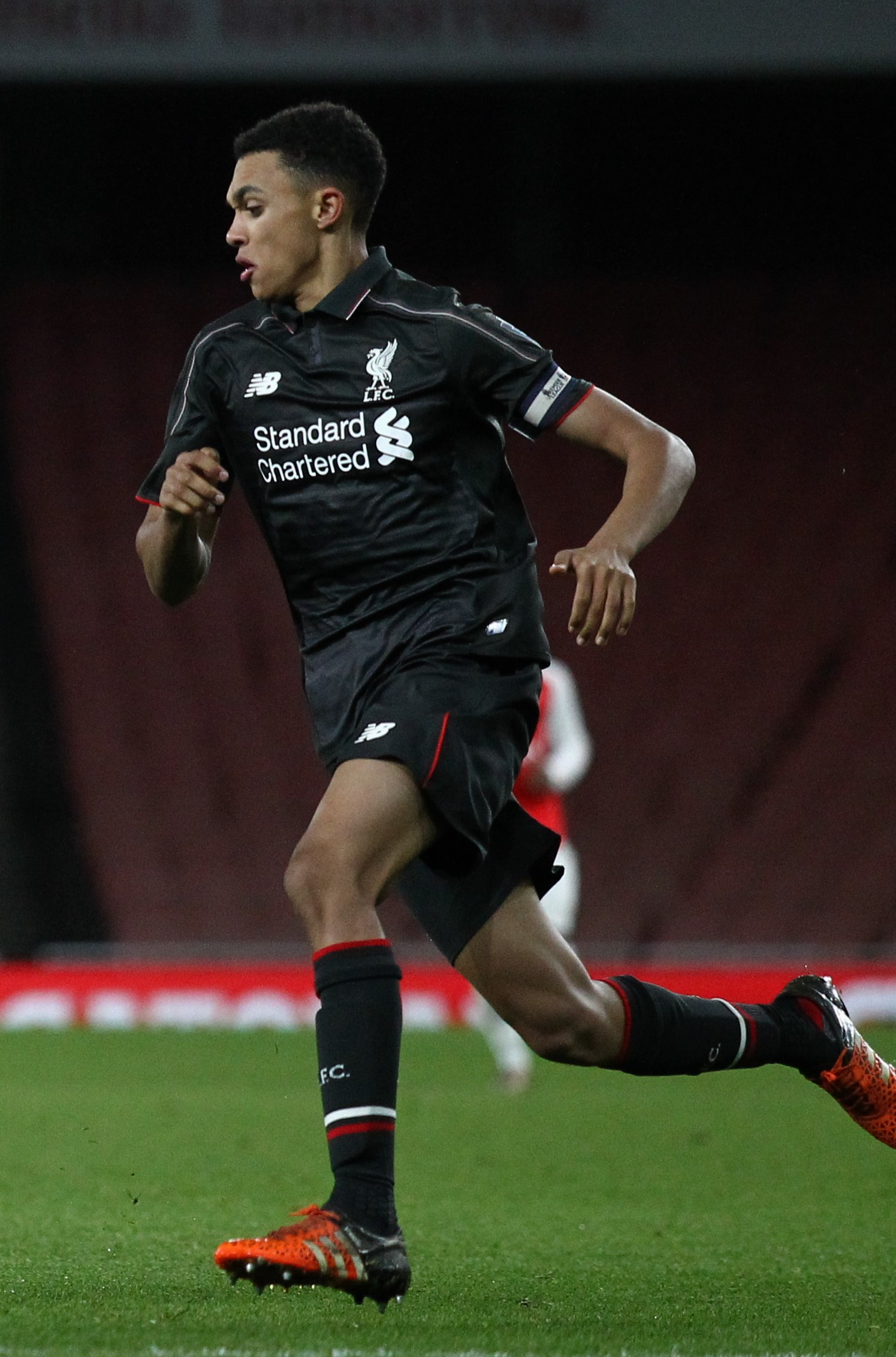
Alexander-Arnold playing for Liverpool U18 in 2016

Having previously taken part in Liverpool's pre-season tour of the United States, Alexander-Arnold made his professional debut on 25 October 2016, starting in a 2–1 victory over Tottenham Hotspur in the fourth round of the EFL Cup. He was booked in the first half for a foul on Ben Davies, which he later revealed could have ended in him being sent off, before being substituted for first-choice right-back Nathaniel Clyne in the 68th minute. Despite the indiscretion, his performance earned a spot in the EFL Cup Team of the Round alongside teammate Daniel Sturridge.

Alexander-Arnold's breakthrough into the first team was rewarded with a new long-term contract in November and he started in Liverpool's next EFL Cup match later that month against Leeds United. He was named man of the match for his performance after registering his first assist for the club by setting up striker Divock Origi for the opening goal of a 2–0 win for Liverpool. He then made his Premier League debut on 14 December, coming on as a late substitute in a 3–0 win over Middlesbrough, and made his first league start in a 1–1 draw with Manchester United on 15 January 2017. In May, having made 12 appearances across all competitions, he was named Liverpool's Young Player of the Season and was also nominated for the Premier League 2 Player of the Season award.

==== 2017–18: First Champions League final ====
In the buildup to the 2017–18 season, regular right-back Clyne suffered a serious back injury which afforded Alexander-Arnold the opportunity to rotate with Joe Gomez during the early stages of the campaign. On 15 August 2017, he scored his first goal for the club when he struck home from a free kick in a 2–1 first leg Champions League play-off round win over Bundesliga team TSG Hoffenheim. In doing so, he became the third youngest player to score on his European debut for Liverpool, after Michael Owen and David Fairclough. During the group stages of the competition, Alexander-Arnold scored again in a 7–0 Champions League win over Maribor on 17 October, a result which was the joint-largest ever away win in the competition, and largest away win by an English club. He then scored his first Premier League goal for Liverpool on 26 December in a 5–0 home win over Swansea City.

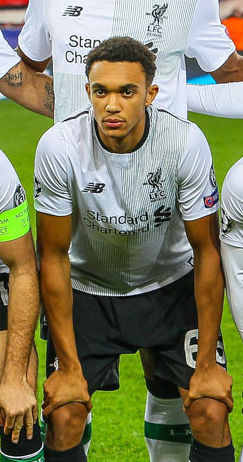
Alexander-Arnold lining up for Liverpool in 2017

In March the following year, Alexander-Arnold endured his most difficult spell with the club to date, after struggling against Crystal Palace winger Wilfried Zaha and Manchester United's Marcus Rashford in successive weeks. Nonetheless, he retained his position in Liverpool's starting line-up to become the youngest English player to start in a Champions League quarter-final match and performed strongly in a 3–0 win over English rivals Manchester City in April. His performance saw him named man of the match and earned him praise from the media for his ability to nullify City winger Leroy Sané. He impressed again in the reverse fixture as Liverpool eliminated City 5–1 on aggregate to advance to the semi-finals of the competition for the first time in 10 years.

On 10 May 2018, his domestic and European form was rewarded when he won the Liverpool Young Player of the Season award for the second season running. Later that month, he became the youngest Liverpool player to start in a Champions League final when he was named in the starting line-up against two-time reigning champions, Real Madrid. Tasked with marking Cristiano Ronaldo, he performed admirably though Liverpool ultimately succumbed to a 3–1 defeat. Following the conclusion of the season, in which he scored three goals in 33 appearances across all competitions, he was nominated for the Golden Boy award where he was later voted runner-up to Ajax defender, Matthijs de Ligt.

==== 2018–19: Regular starter and Champions League title ====
During the early stages of the following season, he made his 50th appearance for Liverpool when he started in a 2–1 victory over Tottenham; the same opposition against whom he had made his debut almost two years prior. In October, he was one of 10 players nominated for the inaugural Kopa Trophy, an award presented by France Football to the best young player under the age of 21, and ultimately ended sixth in the voting polls, having received votes from Owen, Denis Law and Pavel Nedvěd. He continued to enhance his burgeoning reputation in the months thereafter and was consistently listed in reports by the CIES as the world's most valuable full-back from a transfer value perspective. Alexander-Arnold elevated his game further following the turn of the year and, on 27 February 2019, became the youngest player, aged 20 years and 143 days, to record three assists in a single Premier League match when he set up Sadio Mané twice and Virgil van Dijk once in a 5–0 win over Watford. Less than two months later, he became the fifth-youngest player to reach 50 Premier League appearances for the club, behind Owen, Raheem Sterling, Robbie Fowler and Gerrard, when he started in a 3–1 win over Southampton. His domestic form was rewarded later in April when he was nominated for the PFA Young Player of the Year award, although the award was won by Manchester City's Sterling, and he was later named in the PFA Team of the Year alongside Liverpool teammates Van Dijk, Mané and Andy Robertson.

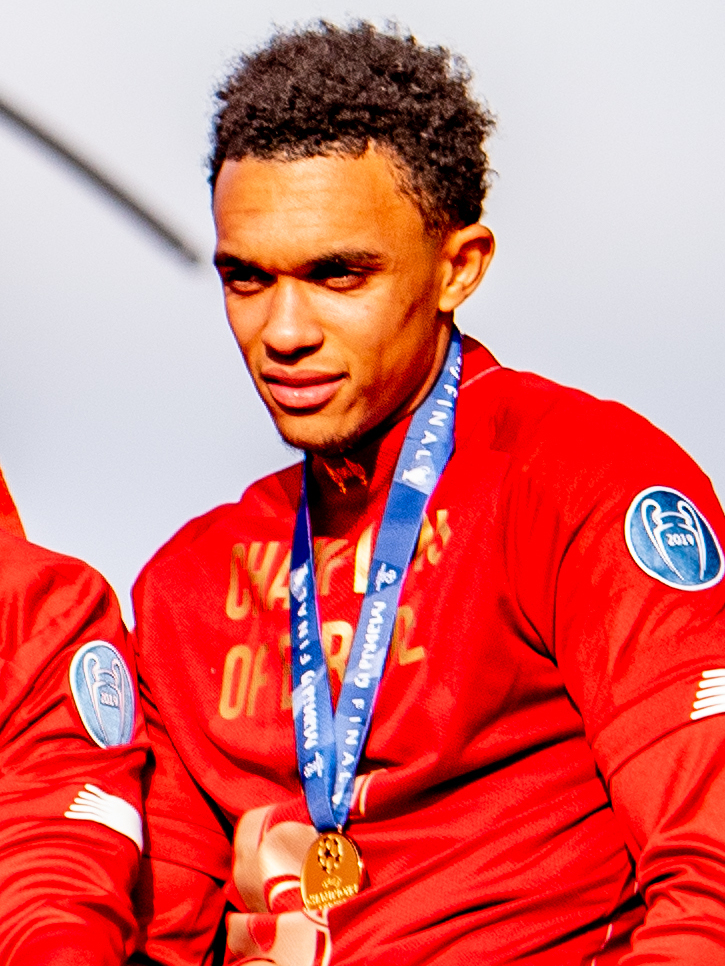
Alexander-Arnold during Liverpool's victory parade after winning the 2019 UEFA Champions League final

Alexander-Arnold's creative prowess came to the fore once again in May when, during a 3–2 win over Newcastle United, Alexander-Arnold equalled the Premier League record for the most assists by a defender in a season, with his two assists in the match raising his tally to 11. It also saw him and Robertson, who had 11 assists of his own, become the first set of defenders from the same team to record double figures for assists in the same season. Three days later, with Liverpool trailing Barcelona 3–0 on aggregate after a first-leg defeat, he recorded two more assists, including an "instinctive corner" for Origi's winning goal, to help the club to a 4–3 aggregate victory and progress to a second consecutive Champions League final. On the final day of the domestic season, Alexander-Arnold assisted Mané in a 2–0 win over Wolverhampton Wanderers to break the Premier League record for the most assists by a defender in a domestic campaign, with 12, surpassing previous holders Andy Hinchcliffe, Leighton Baines and Robertson. He then started in the Champions League Final, a 2–0 win over Tottenham, and became the youngest player to start in two successive finals in the competition, breaking the record set by AC Milan's Christian Panucci in 1995. He was later named in the competition's Team of the Season and nominated for the Defender of the Season award.

==== 2019–20: Ballon d'Or nomination and Premier League title ====
Alexander-Arnold began the 2019–20 season with his position as Liverpool's right-back cemented, and provided the assist for Origi's goal in the club's 4–1 opening game win over Norwich City. In doing so, he became only the eighth player in the Premier League era to register an assist in five consecutive games, and the first to do so for Liverpool. He appeared in subsequent wins over Southampton and Arsenal, as well as in Liverpool's triumph over Chelsea in the UEFA Super Cup where he scored a penalty in the shoot-out. He then scored his first goal of the season during Liverpool's 2–1 league win over the Blues from a set-piece routine that was later nominated for the Premier League Goal of the Month award. The following month, he was nominated for the 2019 Ballon d'Or award, alongside six of his Liverpool teammates.

On 2 November, at the age of 21 years and 26 days, he became the fourth-youngest player to reach 100 appearances for Liverpool, behind Owen, Sterling and Fowler, and marked the occasion by assisting Mané for the winning goal in a 2–1 victory over Aston Villa. Exactly one month later, he was voted as the 19th-best player in the world at the Ballon d'Or ceremony, and the highest-ranked full-back. He then made his FIFA Club World Cup debut during Liverpool's 2–1 semi-final win over reigning CONCACAF champions Monterrey, and provided the match-winning assist for Roberto Firmino in stoppage time after coming on as a substitute for James Milner. Three days later, he started and played the full 120 minutes as Liverpool were crowned champions for the first time in the club's history following a 1–0 win after extra time over Copa Libertadores champions Flamengo.

Upon returning from Qatar, Liverpool recorded a 4–0 league win over second-placed Leicester City during a match in which Alexander-Arnold played a hand in all four goals by scoring one, assisting two, and winning a penalty which was converted by Milner. He was later rewarded for his form with the Premier League Player of the Month award, becoming the first full-back to claim the honour since Micah Richards in 2007. Further recognition followed at the turn of the year, when he was named in the 2019 UEFA Team of the Year. Alexander-Arnold then played a starring role in Liverpool's 2–1 win over Wolves as the club extended their unbeaten run in the league to 40 matches. During the encounter, he assisted captain Jordan Henderson for the opening goal and, in the process, became the first defender in the competition's history to reach double figures for assists in multiple campaigns.

Towards the end of February, following a 3–2 win over West Ham United, he matched his league assist record from the season before and took his overall tally in the Premier League to 25, becoming the third-youngest player in the competition's history to reach a quarter-century of assists behind Cesc Fàbregas and Wayne Rooney. The season was temporarily suspended between March and June due to the outbreak of the COVID-19 pandemic, following which Alexander-Arnold helped Liverpool win their first league title in 30 years, and their first in the Premier League era. With the title secured, he then broke his own assist record on the penultimate day of the season when he set Firmino up to score in a 5–3 win over Chelsea. For his contributions during the season, he was awarded the inaugural Premier League Young Player of the Season award, won the PFA Young Player of the Year accolade and was named in the PFA Team of the Year.

==== 2020–21: Continued success ====
Alexander-Arnold continued to feature prominently for Liverpool during the 2020–21 season and, on 9 December, became the youngest player to captain the club in European competition, and third-youngest in any competition, when he donned the armband during a 1–1 Champions League draw against Midtjylland. Later that month, he was named in the 2020 FIFA FIFPro Men's World 11 alongside teammates Alisson, Van Dijk and Thiago, althewhile Liverpool set about its domestic title defence by topping the league standings by Christmas.

However, both his and the club's form waned in the second half of the season which culminated in Alexander-Arnold's highly publicised omission from Gareth Southgate's England squad for March's 2022 FIFA World Cup qualification matches against San Marino, Albania and Poland. As a result, his performances came under intense scrutiny following the international break and he was criticised for making defensive errors during Liverpool's 3–1 defeat to Real Madrid in the Champions League. In the Premier League, his form improved and he was lauded for his game-winning performances against Arsenal and Aston Villa, scoring the winning goal in the 90th minute of the latter fixture, and was shortlisted for the Premier League Player of the Month award for April. The following month, he recorded back-to-back assists in victories away to Manchester United, where Liverpool won for the first time in seven years, and West Bromwich Albion, where his 94th-minute corner was headed home by goalkeeper Becker to keep the club's hopes of qualifying for the following season's Champions League alive.

==== 2021–22: Career milestones and domestic double ====
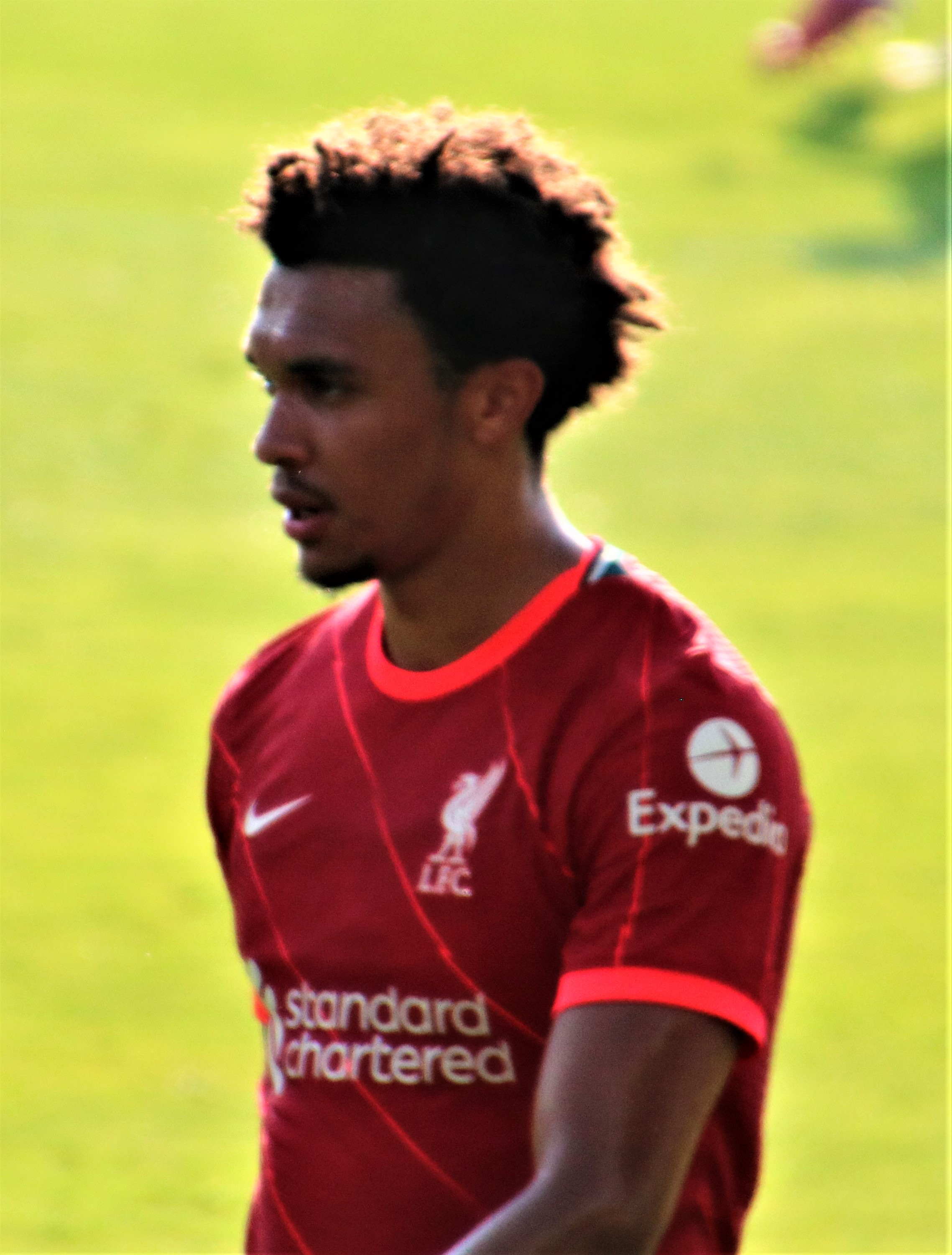
Alexander-Arnold playing for Liverpool in 2021

On 30 July, Alexander-Arnold signed a new long-term contract with Liverpool. On 16 December, Alexander-Arnold scored Liverpool's third goal in a 3–1 home win against Newcastle United with a 25-yard strike into the top left corner of the goal in what was Liverpool's 2,000th top-flight win, the first club in English history to reach this landmark. In May 2022, following Liverpool's victory over Chelsea in the 2022 FA Cup Final, Alexander-Arnold became the youngest-ever player to win six major trophies, namely the FIFA Club World Cup, UEFA Champions League, UEFA Super Cup, Premier League, FA Cup and League Cup, for an English club, doing so at the age of 23 years and 219 days. Alexander-Arnold came 22nd in the 2022 Ballon d'Or as Liverpool narrowly missed out on a historic quadruple, finishing in 2nd place in the Premier League and once again losing the Champions League final to Real Madrid. Alexander-Arnold was selected as part of the Champions League Team of the Season.

==== 2022–23: Minor change of position and further success ====
Following a sub-standard run of club form, Liverpool manager Jürgen Klopp decided to switch Alexander-Arnold to an inverted full-back role, allowing him to see more of the ball and play further up the pitch. In this role, Alexander-Arnold shifted next to a defensive midfielder, in front of three defenders, when Liverpool were in possession. This switch proved to be the catalyst for an improved run of individual and club form. On 17 April 2023, Alexander-Arnold provided his 50th assist in the Premier League in a victory away to Leeds United. On 30 April 2023, Alexander-Arnold became the first person to assist a goal in five consecutive Premier League matches twice. However, at the end of the 2022–23 season, Liverpool narrowly missed out on UEFA Champions League qualification.

==== 2023–24: Vice-captaincy and minor injury ====
On 31 July 2023, following the departure of James Milner, Alexander-Arnold was named as Liverpool's new vice-captain, acting as deputy to Virgil van Dijk. On 25 November, he scored his first goal of the 2023–24 season, an equaliser against Manchester City in a 1–1 draw at the City of Manchester Stadium. On 7 January 2024, during a match against Arsenal, Alexander-Arnold hyperextended his knee, causing him to suffer a small tear in a lateral ligament. He was ruled out for an estimated three weeks following the injury. On 10 February, he assisted Diogo Jota's goal against Burnley, making him the defender with the highest number of assists in Premier League history, overtaking his Liverpool teammate Andy Robertson.

==== 2024–25: Second Premier League title and departure ====
Alexander-Arnold entered the final year of his contract with Liverpool amid rumours of his subsequent move to Real Madrid. In an interview in October, he stated his intention to become the first full-back to win Ballon d'Or, an award that has most often gone to Real Madrid players.

During the 3–3 draw against Newcastle United at St. James' Park in December, Alexander-Arnold contributed two assists from the substitutes bench, becoming the first defender in Premier League history to record 60 assists. On 29 December, he scored his first goal of the season in a 5–0 away win at West Ham United in the Premier League.

On 11 March, Alexander-Arnold was substituted with an ankle injury in Liverpool's 1–0 defeat to Paris Saint-Germain in the UEFA Champions League round of 16. This injury caused him to miss the next four matches including the 2025 EFL Cup final, which the club lost 2–1 to Newcastle United. He returned to the Liverpool squad on 20 April as a 71st-minute substitute against Leicester City, making his 350th appearance for the club. Five minutes later he scored the only goal of the match to take Liverpool within one win of securing their 20th English league title. On 5 May, eight days after winning the Premier League title, Alexander-Arnold announced that he had decided to leave Liverpool at the end of the season, bringing an end to his 20-year association with the club.

=== Real Madrid ===
On 30 May 2025, Real Madrid announced the signing of Alexander-Arnold on a six-year contract. Although he would become a free agent in July, the Spanish club decided to pay Liverpool a fee of €10 million so that the player could participate in the 2025 FIFA Club World Cup, starting in June. Alexander-Arnold became the seventh Englishman to join Los Blancos in the professional era. (Note: The previous six were Laurie Cunningham, Steve McManaman, David Beckham, Michael Owen, Jonathan Woodgate and Jude Bellingham.) On 11 June, he was officially unveiled as a new player at a ceremony held at Real Madrid City, being granted a shirt number 12, a transition from the number 66 he previously wore during his tenure at Liverpool. He also switched the name on the back of his shirt from 'Alexander-Arnold' to 'Trent' in order to simplify his name.

On 18 June, he made his debut for the club in the FIFA Club World Cup draw against Al Hilal. Alexander-Arnold started in the first 5 matches at the tournament, but due to a leg muscle issue, he was left out of the squad for the semi-final against PSG, in which Real Madrid were eliminated. With the start of La Liga season in August, he shared right-back duties with Dani Carvajal.

On September 16, Alexander-Arnold started in Real Madrid’s opening 2025–26 Champions League match against Marseille, but was forced off in the 5th minute due to a hamstring injury, which put him out for seven weeks. He returned to action in the Champions League away loss against Liverpool on 4 November, coming on as a substitute for the final nine minutes. He received a hostile reception at Anfield and was constantly booed. A mural of Alexander-Arnold unveiled in 2019 with his quote, 'I am just a normal lad from Liverpool whose dream has just come true' was also vandalised, with the word 'rat' being repeatedly sprayed onto the image. The incident prompted widespread discussion among fans and pundits.

Alexander-Arnold subsequently made five more appearances for Real Madrid, but a thigh injury in a December match against Athletic Bilbao sidelined him for a further two months. By the end of the season, he had made 21 La Liga appearances, 14 of which were in the starting line-up.

Alexander-Arnold was one of the few Real Madrid players who did not participate in the 2026 World Cup and had a full pre-season with new head coach José Mourinho. With the start of the new season, he effectively became the third-choice right-back, behind Federico Valverde and summer signing Denzel Dumfries.

== International career ==
=== Youth ===
Alexander-Arnold has represented England at various youth levels and featured at the 2015 FIFA U-17 World Cup in Chile. He also scored three goals for the England U19 team, including a brace against Croatia and another against Spain which secured England's qualification for the 2017 UEFA European Under-19 Championship. He did not feature at the tournament itself as Liverpool reached an agreement with England to rest him ahead of the following season's league campaign, but the Three Lions went on to defeat Portugal in the final to claim their first ever title in the competition. The month following the tournament, he was called up to the England U21 team for the first time for their UEFA European Under-21 Championship qualifiers against Netherlands and Latvia, and made his debut in a 3–0 win over the latter. Two more appearances followed with the U21 side before he was promoted and solidified his status within the senior England camp.

=== Senior ===
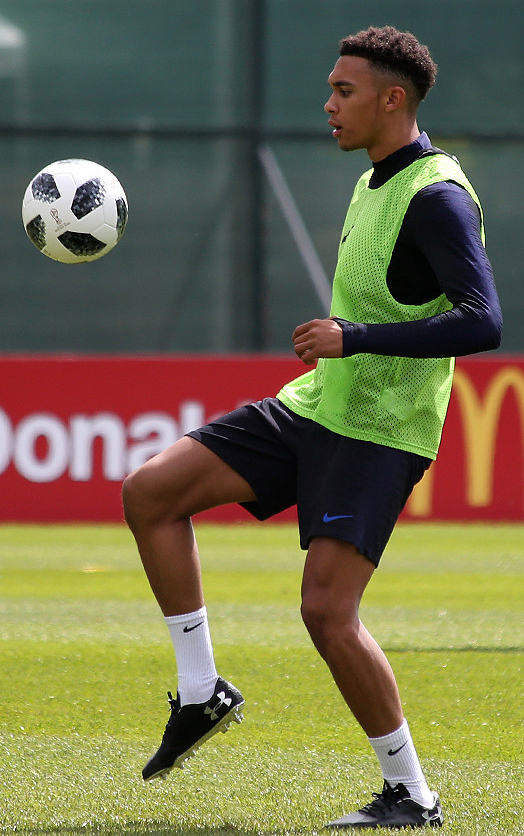
Alexander-Arnold training with England at the 2018 FIFA World Cup

In March 2018, while part of the U21 team, Alexander-Arnold was invited to train with the senior national team for the first time ahead of their friendly matches against Italy and the Netherlands. He received his first call-up in May 2018 when he was named in Gareth Southgate's squad for the 2018 FIFA World Cup. His debut followed on 7 June 2018 when he started in a 2–0 pre-tournament friendly win over Costa Rica at Elland Road. Prior to the match, he was handed his match jersey by Prince William, Duke of Cambridge. Alexander-Arnold then made his debut in the competition on 28 June, starting in a 1–0 group-stage defeat to Belgium, after both sides had already confirmed their progression to the knockout stages. In doing so, he became only the fourth teenager to start a match for England at a World Cup. It remained, however, his only appearance as Kieran Trippier was preferred at right-back and featured throughout as England were defeated by Croatia in the semi-finals, and then again by Belgium in the third place play-off.

On 15 November 2018, during a friendly international, held in honour of Wayne Rooney, Alexander-Arnold scored his first senior international goal as England recorded a 3–0 win over the United States at Wembley Stadium. In doing so, and at the age of 20 years and 39 days, he became the youngest Liverpool player since Michael Owen in 1999 to score for the national team. In June 2019, he was part of the England squad which ended third at the inaugural UEFA Nations League and played the full match in a penalty shoot-out win over Switzerland in the third-place play-off. Two years later, he was named in England's 26-man squad for the UEFA Euro 2020 but was forced to withdraw eight days before the competition commenced after sustaining a thigh injury during a pre-tournament friendly against Austria.

On 10 November 2022, he was named in England's 26-man squad for the 2022 FIFA World Cup. where he made one appearance against Wales in the group stage.

On 16 June 2023, Alexander-Arnold scored a long-ranged goal in a 4–0 victory in the UEFA Euro 2024 qualifiers against Malta and he was described by Jacob Steinberg of the Guardian as having "oozed class". Alexander-Arnold played in the same 'Number 10' role in the next game and was likewise praised.

On 3 June 2024, in a Euro 2024 warm-up match against Bosnia and Herzegovina, Alexander-Arnold scored his third England goal and was named Player of the Match as the team won 3–0. Three days later, he was named in England's 26-man squad for UEFA Euro 2024, where he was listed as a midfielder and assigned the number 8 shirt.

Alexander-Arnold started England's opening match of Euro 2024, partnering Declan Rice in central midfield as the team beat Serbia 1–0 in Gelsenkirchen. He played 69 minutes before being substituted for Conor Gallagher. He went on to start the second match against Denmark, being substituted for Gallagher in the 54th minute, before playing the final six minutes of the final match against Slovenia as a substitute for Kieran Trippier. In the quarter-final against Switzerland, Alexander-Arnold appeared as a substitute for Phil Foden in the 25th minute of extra time and scored England's decisive fifth kick of the penalty shootout.

== Player profile ==
=== Style of play ===
Alexander-Arnold is widely acknowledged for his range of passing, crossing and assists, although he has received some criticism from some pundits and fans for his defensive capabilities.

During the early years of his career, he emerged as one of the Premier League's most creative players due to his role in assisting goals from early crosses and set-piece deliveries. He possesses an impressive passing range, which is attributed to his development as a midfielder during his time in Liverpool's youth academy, and has been one of Liverpool's designated set-piece specialists for deadball situations since the 2017–18 season. His set-piece routine, which involves three parallel steps backwards and one to the right, has been likened to that of former rugby union player Jonny Wilkinson. Alexander-Arnold's craft and intelligence from deadball situations was singled out for particular praise by Gary Lineker and Cesc Fàbregas after he assisted the winning goal in the 2018–19 Champions League semi-final against Barcelona by delivering a quickly-taken corner while the opposition players had their backs turned.

Under Liverpool manager Jürgen Klopp, whose tactical set-up placed creative responsibility on the shoulders of the club's full-backs, Alexander-Arnold was predominantly deployed down the right flank where his overlapping runs, switching of play, accuracy of crossing and work-rate in tracking back saw him become an important figure in the side's transitional style of play centred around high pressing.

=== Reception ===
Two-time World Cup winner and former right-back Cafu has praised Alexander-Arnold, saying "He's a sensational player, a rare talent. He's technically brilliant, he has so much quality. He has a Brazilian style of play. I love watching him play. And playing in such a great team will help him grow." Lionel Messi has called him "impressive" and remarked "[He is] the future, a fullback who is impressive going forward." Former Manchester United defender Gary Neville stated, "He's the best passer of a ball at right-back that I've ever seen. He's David Beckham and Kevin De Bruyne at right-back".

Alexander-Arnold has been the subject to criticism from some fans and pundits for his defensive capabilities. However, during the 2020–21 and 2022–23 seasons, seasons during which this criticism intensified, he compared favourably with fellow English right-backs including Reece James and Kyle Walker, with his defensive statistics ranking the best among them. He has been defended by Klopp, who said "If anyone says Trent can't defend, they should come to me and I'll knock them down. I cannot hear that anymore, I don't know what the boy has to do!"

== Philanthropy ==
Outside of football, Alexander-Arnold volunteers as an ambassador for the Liverpool-based charity An Hour for Others, which seeks to provide underprivileged members of the community with anything from food hampers and toys to cooking and science lessons. He has supported the charity since being introduced to it by his mother in his mid-teens. During his time with Liverpool's academy, he and teammate Kris Owens pledged to support the initiative if either of them made it as professional footballers. His philanthropy also expands beyond the charity and in March 2019, after signing a new boot sponsorship with Under Armour (the second most lucrative boot deal in England behind Harry Kane's) he initiated plans to purchase plots in Liverpool and use the funds to construct new pitches for the community.

In April 2020, Alexander-Arnold teamed up with Under Armour to support doctors, nurses, and key workers battling the COVID-19 Pandemic. Alexander-Arnold and Under Armour provided over 2,000 products for workers at the Royal Liverpool University Hospital.

He is a supporter of the Black Lives Matter movement, wearing a special pair of boots featuring the phrase and auctioning them off in a raffle for the Nelson Mandela Foundation, raising £27,000 in the process. The boots were later displayed in the National Football Museum in Manchester and FIFA Museum in Zurich.

In April 2023, he set up The After Academy, an initiative funded by Alexander-Arnold for the next five years that will support and aide former academy footballers. The After Academy is intended to provide training and career opportunities both in and out of football for footballers who did not make it past academy level and is being run with the co-operation of the PFA and Alexander-Arnold's sponsors, Red Bull, Under Armour and Therabody.

== Personal life ==
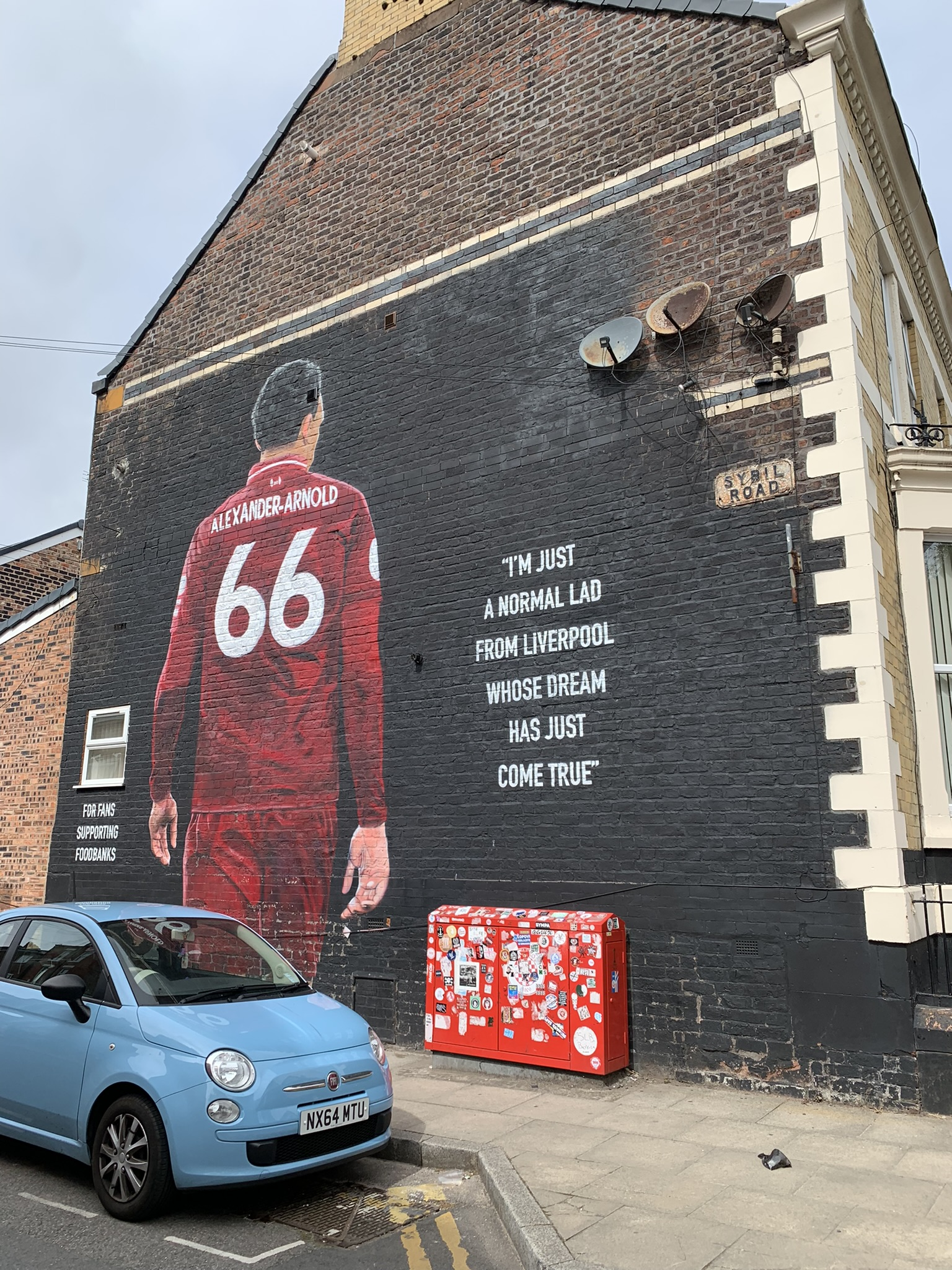
Mural of Alexander-Arnold in 2022

Alexander-Arnold is the nephew of former Reading and Millwall footballer, and former Manchester United club secretary, John Alexander. His maternal grandmother, Doreen Carling, was once also in a relationship with former United manager, Alex Ferguson, before moving to New York City where she later married. Alexander-Arnold was thus eligible to play for the United States prior to making his England debut. He has two brothers; Tyler, who is four years his senior and acts as his agent, and Marcel, who is three years younger. He is of Scottish and American descent.

He is also an avid chess player, having been introduced to the game by his father as a youngster, and in 2018 he played an invitational match against world champion Magnus Carlsen. The match, which was played as part of a campaign to promote the sport, ended in defeat for Alexander-Arnold after seventeen moves. Alexander-Arnold later explained how chess was more than just a pastime and had helped him in his football career by teaching him to think "two or three moves ahead of the opposition".

Alexander-Arnold is good friends with Real Madrid and England teammate Jude Bellingham.

In 2023, Alexander-Arnold joined the investment group of the Alpine racing team of Formula One.

== Career statistics ==
=== Club ===
As of match played 21 November 2026

Appearances and goals by club, season and competition
Club	Season	League			National cup (Note: Includes FA Cup, Copa del Rey)		League cup (Note: Includes EFL Cup)		Europe		Other		Total	
Club	Season	Division	Apps	Goals	Apps	Goals	Apps	Goals	Apps	Goals	Apps	Goals	Apps	Goals
Liverpool	2016–17	Premier League	7	0	2	0	3	0	—		—		12	0
Liverpool	2017–18	Premier League	19	1	2	0	0	0	12 (Note: Appearances in UEFA Champions League)	2	—		33	3
Liverpool	2018–19	Premier League	29	1	0	0	0	0	11	0	—		40	1
Liverpool	2019–20	Premier League	38	4	0	0	0	0	7	0	4 (Note: One appearance in FA Community Shield, one appearance in UEFA Super Cup, two appearances in FIFA Club World Cup)	0	49	4
Liverpool	2020–21	Premier League	36	2	1	0	0	0	8	0	0	0	45	2
Liverpool	2021–22	Premier League	32	2	3	0	3	0	9	0	—		47	2
Liverpool	2022–23	Premier League	37	2	2	0	0	0	7	1	1 (Note: Appearance in FA Community Shield)	1	47	4
Liverpool	2023–24	Premier League	28	3	2	0	2	0	5 (Note: Appearances in UEFA Europa League)	0	—		37	3
Liverpool	2024–25	Premier League	33	3	1	1	2	0	8	0	—		44	4
Liverpool	Total		259	18	13	1	10	0	67	3	5	1	354	23
Real Madrid	2024–25	La Liga	—		—		—		—		5 (Note: Appearances in FIFA Club World Cup)	0	5	0
Real Madrid	2025–26	La Liga	21	0	0	0	—		9	0	0	0	30	0
Real Madrid	2026–27	La Liga	8	0	0	0	—		1	0	0	0	9	0
Real Madrid	Total		29	0	0	0	—		10	0	5	0	44	0
Career total			288	18	13	1	10	0	77	3	10	1	398	23

=== International ===
As of match played 12 November 2026

Appearances and goals by national team and year
National team	Year	Apps	Goals
England	2018	5	1
England	2019	4	0
England	2020	3	0
England	2021	4	0
England	2022	2	0
England	2023	5	1
England	2024	10	2
England	2025	1	0
England	2026	3	0
Total		37	4

As of match played 12 November 2026
England score listed first, score column indicates score after each Alexander-Arnold goal

List of international goals scored by Trent Alexander-Arnold
No.	Date	Venue	Cap	Opponent	Score	Result	Competition	Ref.
1	15 November 2018	Wembley Stadium, London, England	5	United States	2–0	3–0	Friendly	
2	16 June 2023	National Stadium, Ta' Qali, Malta	19	Malta	2–0	4–0	UEFA Euro 2024 qualifying	
3	3 June 2024	St James' Park, Newcastle upon Tyne, England	24	Bosnia and Herzegovina	2–0	3–0	Friendly	
4	13 October 2024	Helsinki Olympic Stadium, Helsinki, Finland	33	Finland	2–0	3–1	2024–25 UEFA Nations League B	

== Honours ==
Liverpool

- Premier League: 2019–20, 2024–25
- FA Cup: 2021–22
- EFL Cup: 2021–22, 2023–24; runner-up: 2024–25
- FA Community Shield: 2022
- UEFA Champions League: 2018–19
- UEFA Super Cup: 2019
- FIFA Club World Cup: 2019

England

- UEFA European Championship runner-up: 2024
- UEFA Nations League third place: 2018–19

Individual

- Liverpool Young Player of the Season: 2016–17, 2017–18
- PFA Team of the Year: 2018–19 Premier League, 2019–20 Premier League, 2021–22 Premier League
- UEFA Champions League Team of the Season: 2018–19, 2021–22
- Premier League Player of the Month: December 2019, November 2021
- IFFHS Men's World Team: 2019, 2020
- UEFA Team of the Year: 2019
- PFA Young Player of the Year: 2019–20
- Premier League Young Player of the Season: 2019–20
- ESM Team of the Year: 2019–20, 2021–22
- FIFA FIFPro World11: 2020
- Premier League Fan Team of the Season: 2023–24
- The Athletic Premier League Team of the Season: 2024–25
