= 2005–06 Charlton Athletic F.C. season =

Charlton Athletic
2005–06 season
- Chairman: Richard Murray
- Manager: Alan Curbishley
- Stadium: The Valley
- FA Premier League: 13th
- FA Cup: Sixth round
- League Cup: Fourth round
- Top goalscorer: League: Darren Bent (18); All: Darren Bent (22)
- Highest home attendance: 27,111 (vs. Arsenal, Liverpool, Chelsea and Tottenham Hotspur)
- Lowest home attendance: 23,453 (vs. Wigan Athletic, 20 August 2005)
- Average home league attendance: 26,195
Home colours	Away colours	Third colours

During the 2005–06 season, Charlton Athletic competed in the FA Premier League. The club also competed in the FA Cup, and the League Cup.

== Season summary ==
Charlton started the season well, coming third at the end of August, second at the end of September and fifth at the end of October, but fell away during the second half of the season to finish in the lower half of the table in thirteenth. At the end of the season, manager Alan Curbishley resigned after 15 years at the club - 10 as manager - amidst rumours the FA was going to approach him with an offer to manage the English national side (the job eventually went to Middlesbrough's Steve McLaren). Curbishley was replaced by Iain Dowie, who infamously left South London rivals Crystal Palace, claiming he wanted to be closer to his family in Bolton - only to join the Addicks.

Striker Darren Bent, signed from Championship side Ipswich Town, made a significant impact in his first full Premiership season, scoring 18 goals (22 in all competitions) to finish as the third highest scorer in the league and the highest scoring Englishman. Unfortunately for him his prolific scoring was not enough for him to make England's World Cup squad, with Arsenal's 17-year-old striker Theo Walcott a surprise inclusion ahead of him.

== Kit ==
After two seasons Charlton changed their home kit, although Spanish apparel manufacturers Joma remained the suppliers. During the season, however, kit sponsors all:sports went bankrupt; Charlton then signed a sponsorship deal with Spanish real estate company Llanera through to the end of the 2007–08 season.

For the club's centenary, in a match in October, Charlton wore a special centenary kit with a white band down the left-hand side of the shirt and a red band down the left-hand side of the shorts.

== Final league table ==
Pos	Team	Pld	W	D	L	GF	GA	GD	Pts
11	Everton	38	14	8	16	34	49	−15	50
12	Fulham	38	14	6	18	48	58	−10	48
13	Charlton Athletic	38	13	8	17	41	55	−14	47
14	Middlesbrough	38	12	9	17	48	58	−10	45
15	Manchester City	38	13	4	21	43	48	−5	43

Source: Premier League
Rules for classification: 1) points; 2) goal difference; 3) number of goals scored.

=== Results per matchday ===
Matchday	1	2	3	4	5	6	7	8	9	10	11	12	13	14	15	16	17	18	19	20	21	22	23	24	25	26	27	28	29	30	31	32	33	34	35	36	37	38
Ground	A	H	A	A	H	A	H	H	A	H	A	H	A	H	H	A	H	H	A	H	A	H	A	H	A	A	H	A	H	A	H	A	H	A	H	A	H	A
Result	W	W	W	W	L	W	L	D	W	L	L	L	L	L	W	L	L	W	L	W	D	D	L	W	L	D	D	D	W	L	W	D	D	L	W	L	L	L
Position	1	2	4	2	2	2	2	4	4	5	7	9	11	11	11	11	12	12	13	11	11	11	13	11	12	13	13	13	13	13	11	11	12	12	11	11	12	13

Source: WorldFootball.com
A = Away; H = Home; W = Win; D = Draw; L = Loss

== Results ==
Charlton Athletic's score comes first

=== Legend ===
Win	Draw	Loss

=== FA Premier League ===
Date	Opponent	Venue	Result	Attendance	Scorers
13 August 2005	Sunderland	A	3–1	34,446	D Bent (2), Murphy
20 August 2005	Wigan Athletic	H	1–0	23,453	D Bent
28 August 2005	Middlesbrough	A	3–0	26,206	Rommedahl, Perry, D Bent
10 September 2005	Birmingham City	A	1–0	26,846	D Bent
17 September 2005	Chelsea	H	0–2	27,111	
24 September 2005	West Bromwich Albion	A	2–1	23,909	Murphy (2, 1 pen)
1 October 2005	Tottenham Hotspur	H	2–3	27,111	D Bent (2)
17 October 2005	Fulham	H	1–1	26,310	Murphy
22 October 2005	Portsmouth	A	2–1	19,030	Ambrose, Rommedahl
29 October 2005	Bolton Wanderers	H	0–1	26,175	
5 November 2005	Blackburn Rovers	A	1–4	17,691	Hughes
19 November 2005	Manchester United	H	1–3	26,730	Ambrose
26 November 2005	Aston Villa	A	0–1	30,023	
4 December 2005	Manchester City	H	2–5	25,289	D Bent, Bothroyd
10 December 2005	Sunderland	H	2–0	26,065	D Bent, Ambrose
17 December 2005	Wigan Athletic	A	0–3	17,074	
26 December 2005	Arsenal	H	0–1	27,111	
31 December 2005	West Ham United	H	2–0	25,952	Bartlett, D Bent
2 January 2006	Everton	A	1–3	34,333	Holland
14 January 2006	Birmingham City	H	2–0	26,312	Hughes, D Bent
22 January 2006	Chelsea	A	1–1	41,355	M Bent
31 January 2006	West Bromwich Albion	H	0–0	25,921	
5 February 2006	Tottenham Hotspur	A	1–3	36,034	Thomas
8 February 2006	Liverpool	H	2–0	27,111	D Bent (pen), Young
12 February 2006	Manchester City	A	2–3	41,347	D Bent, M Bent
22 February 2006	Newcastle United	A	0–0	20,206	
25 February 2006	Aston Villa	H	0–0	26,594	
4 March 2006	Liverpool	A	0–0	43,892	
12 March 2006	Middlesbrough	H	2–1	24,830	D Bent (2)
18 March 2006	Arsenal	A	0–3	38,223	
26 March 2006	Newcastle United	H	3–1	27,019	D Bent (pen), Bowyer (own goal), Bothroyd
2 April 2006	West Ham United	A	0–0	34,753	
8 April 2006	Everton	H	0–0	26,954	
15 April 2006	Fulham	A	1–2	19,146	Euell
17 April 2006	Portsmouth	H	2–1	25,419	Hughes, D Bent
22 April 2006	Bolton Wanderers	A	1–4	24,713	D Bent (pen)
29 April 2006	Blackburn Rovers	H	0–2	26,254	
7 May 2006	Manchester United	A	0–4	73,006	

=== FA Cup ===
Round	Date	Opponent	Venue	Result	Attendance	Goalscorers
R3	7 January 2006	Sheffield Wednesday	A	4–2	14,851	Rommedahl (2), Holland, D Bent
R4	28 January 2006	Leyton Orient	H	2–1	22,029	Fortune, Bothroyd
R5	18 February 2006	Brentford	H	3–1	22,098	D Bent, Bothroyd, Hughes
QF	23 March 2006	Middlesbrough	H	0–0	24,187	
QFR	12 April 2006	Middlesbrough	A	2–4	30,248	Hughes, Southgate (own goal)

=== League Cup ===
Round	Date	Opponent	Venue	Result	Attendance	Goalscorers
R2	20 September 2005	Hartlepool United	H	3–1	10,328	Johansson (pen), D Bent, Bothroyd
R3	26 October 2005	Chelsea	A	1–1 (won 5–4 on pens)	42,198	D Bent
R4	30 November 2005	Blackburn Rovers	H	2–3	14,093	Ambrose, Murphy

== Players ==
=== First-team squad ===
Squad at end of season

Note: Flags indicate national team as defined under FIFA eligibility rules; some limited exceptions apply. Players may hold more than one non-FIFA nationality.

No.	Pos.	Nation	Player
2	DF	ENG	Luke Young
3	DF	ISL	Hermann Hreidarsson
4	DF	URU	Gonzalo Sorondo (on loan from Inter Milan)
5	DF	ENG	Chris Perry
6	FW	ENG	Marcus Bent
7	DF	BUL	Radostin Kishishev
8	MF	IRL	Matt Holland (Note: Holland was born in Bury, England, but qualified to represent the Republic of Ireland internationally through his grandmother and made his debut for Republic of Ireland in 1999.) (captain)
9	FW	JAM	Jason Euell (Note: Euell was born in Lambeth, England, and represented them at U-21 level, but also qualified to represent Jamaica internationally through his father and made his international debut for Jamaica in November 2004.)
10	FW	ENG	Darren Bent
11	FW	ENG	Francis Jeffers
12	FW	JAM	Kevin Lisbie (Note: Lisbie was born in Hackney, England, but also qualified to represent Jamaica internationally and made his international debut for Jamaica in 2002.)
14	MF	ENG	Jerome Thomas
16	GK	DEN	Stephan Andersen
17	FW	RSA	Shaun Bartlett
18	MF	ENG	Darren Ambrose
19	MF	DEN	Dennis Rommedahl
20	MF	ENG	Bryan Hughes

No.	Pos.	Nation	Player
22	DF	ENG	Chris Powell
23	DF	USA	Jonathan Spector (on loan from Manchester United)
24	DF	ENG	Jonathan Fortune
26	DF	CTA	Kelly Youga
28	DF	ENG	Osei Sankofa
29	MF	ENG	Lloyd Sam (Note: Sam was born in Leeds, England, and represented them at U-20 level, but also qualified to represent Ghana internationally through his parents and would make his international debut for Ghana in October 2015.)
30	DF	ENG	Mark Ricketts
31	FW	ENG	Alex Varney
32	DF	ENG	Barry Fuller
33	GK	IRL	Darren Randolph
34	FW	ENG	James Walker (Note: Walker was born in Hackney, England, and represented them at U-18 level, but also qualified to represent Antigua and Barbuda internationally and would make his international debut for Antigua and Barbuda in September 2012.)
35	DF	ENG	Nathan Ashton
36	GK	NOR	Thomas Myhre
37	DF	POR	Gonçalo Brandão (on loan from Belenenses)
38	FW	ENG	Jay Bothroyd
39	MF	ISL	Rúrik Gíslason

=== Left club during season ===
Note: Flags indicate national team as defined under FIFA eligibility rules; some limited exceptions apply. Players may hold more than one non-FIFA nationality.

No.	Pos.	Nation	Player
1	GK	IRL	Dean Kiely (Note: Kiely was born in Salford, England, and represented them at U-15, U-16, and U-18 level, but also qualified to represent the Republic of Ireland internationally and made his international debut for the Republic of Ireland in November 1999.) (to Portsmouth)
6	DF	RSA	Mark Fish (retired)
11	FW	ENG	Francis Jeffers (on loan to Rangers)
13	MF	ENG	Danny Murphy (to Tottenham Hotspur)

No.	Pos.	Nation	Player
15	DF	MAR	Talal El Karkouri (on loan to Al Gharafa)
21	FW	FIN	Jonatan Johansson (on loan to Norwich City)
25	MF	RUS	Alexey Smertin (on loan from Chelsea)
27	GK	IRL	Rob Elliot (Note: Elliot was born in Greenwich, England, but also qualifies to represent the Republic of Ireland internationally through his father and represented them at under-19 level before making his international debut for the Republic of Ireland in May 2014.) (on loan to Accrington Stanley)

== Transfers In ==
=== Summer ===
Date	Position	Player	Club From	Fee
1 June 2005	FW	Darren Bent	Ipswich Town	£2,500,000
1 July 2005	DF	Kelly Youga	Lyon	Free
8 July 2005	MF	Darren Ambrose	Newcastle United	Undisclosed
11 July 2005	DF	Jonathan Spector	Manchester United	Loan
11 July 2005	DF	Chris Powell	West Ham United	Free
14 July 2005	DF	Gonzalo Sorondo	Inter Milan	Loan
15 July 2005	MF	Alexei Smertin	Chelsea	Loan (ended 15 March 2006)
8 August 2005	GK	Thomas Myhre	Fredrikstad	Free
8 August 2005	DF	Gonçalo Brandão	Belenenses	Loan
31 August 2005	FW	Jay Bothroyd	Perugia	Free
31 August 2005	MF	Rurik Gisalson	HK Kópavogur	£180,000

=== Winter ===
Date	Position	Player	Club From	Fee
17 January 2006	FW	Marcus Bent	Everton	

== Transfers Out ==
=== Summer ===
Date	Position	Player	Club To	Fee
5 July 2005	DF	Paul Konchesky	West Ham United	£1,500,000
5 August 2005	MF	Stacy Long	Notts County	Free
8 August 2005	DF	Mark Fish	Ipswich Town	One-Month Loan
31 August 2005	FW	Francis Jeffers	Rangers	Six-Month Loan
9 September 2005	FW	Kevin Lisbie	Norwich City	One-Month Loan
27 September 2005	DF	Osei Sankofa	Bristol City	One-Month Loan (extended 1 November)

=== Winter ===
Date	Position	Player	Club To	Fee
25 January 2006	GK	Dean Kiely	Portsmouth	Undisclosed
31 January 2006	MF	Danny Murphy	Tottenham Hotspur	£2,000,000
31 January 2006	FW	Jonatan Johansson	Norwich City	Loan
22 February 2006	FW	Kevin Lisbie	Derby County	One-Month Loan

== Statistics ==
=== Starting 11 ===
Considering starts in all competitions

- GK: #36, (Norway) Thomas Myhre, 26
- RB: #2, (England) Luke Young, 38
- CB: #6, (England) Chris Perry, 30
- CB: #3, (Iceland) Hermann Hreidarsson, 42
- LB: #22, (England) Chris Powell, 32
- RM: #19, (Denmark) Dennis Rommedahl, 22
- CM: #8, (Republic of Ireland) Matt Holland, 26
- CM: #7, (Bulgaria) Radostin Kishishev, 40
- CM: #20, (England) Bryan Hughes, 28
- LM: #18, (England) Darren Ambrose, 22
- CF: #10, (England) , Darren Bent, 43

== Awards ==
- August Premier League Player of the Month: Darren Bent
- September Premier League Player of the Month: Danny Murphy
