= Dene Cropper =

English footballer

Personal information
- Date of birth: 5 January 1983 (age 43)
- Place of birth: Chesterfield, England
- Position: Striker

Youth career
- 1999–2000: Sheffield Wednesday

Senior career*
Years	Team	Apps	(Gls)
2000–2002	Sheffield Wednesday	0	(0)
2001–2002	→ Worksop Town (loan)	20	(10)
2002–2004	Lincoln City	65	(18)
2004	→ Gainsborough Trinity (loan)	5	(1)
2004	Boston United	5	(1)
2004–2005	Worksop Town	25	(11)
2005–2011	Matlock Town	91	(39)
2011–2013	Woolley Moor United	27	(36)
- * Club domestic league appearances and goals as of 12 December 2007

Dene Cropper (born 5 January 1983) is an English former professional footballer who notably played in the Football League for Lincoln City and Boston United after starting his career with Sheffield Wednesday. He has also played for Worksop Town, Gainsborough Trinity and Matlock Town.

== Career ==
Cropper was a produce of the youth setup at Sheffield Wednesday and signed professional terms with The Owls in August 2000, a few months prior to the club's relegation from the Premier League. He would make the first and reserve teams and although offered a new deal he left the club on a free transfer in the summer of 2002.

During the 2001–02 season Cropper signed on loan for Worksop Town, He notched up a decent scoring rate for them, netting ten goals in twenty games.

On 10 May 2002, Cropper along with Ben Futcher became Lincoln City manager Keith Alexander's first signings of his second spell in charge at Sincil Bank. He made his Football league debut in the club's 1–1 opening day draw at Kidderminster Harriers on 10 August 2002, though this was marred when, seven minutes from time, referee Phil Crossley deemed his challenge on Abdou Sall unfair and, following an earlier booking for dissent, dismissed him for two bookings. His home debut, three days later, was a far happier affair as he notched his first goal for the club in a 2–0 victory over Rochdale. Cropper had a good season with Lincoln, but failed to score as many goals as his play deserved in a season which saw him and his team lose out in the playoff finals at the Millennium Stadium.

The following season, Cropper found himself overlooked, and was finding himself on the bench on a regular basis due to long lay offs with injury and the performances of the club's other forwards. In February 2004 he signed on loan with Non-League club Gainsborough Trinity, in a month that saw him net once in five appearances at The Northolme. He returned to Lincoln after his month and was subject to another loan offer, this time from Scarborough, but he rejected the chance to play for Scarborough in favour of a permanent switch to local rivals Boston United. Cropper played five times for Boston and scored once but suffered a serious knee injury towards the end of the season which prompted his release from the club.

Upon returning to the game Cropper turned down a move to King's Lynn before re-joining former club Worksop Town. He made a move to Matlock Town in September 2005 for an undisclosed fee.

He joined Woolley Moor United ahead of the 2011–2012 season, debuting in the club's 4–2 Midlands Regional Alliance, Division 1 victory at Findern on 13 August 2011.

== Personal life ==
Outside of football, Cropper is a Physics teacher and Head of Science at Erasmus Darwin Academy. He previously worked at ARK Kings Academy.
