= Graham Futcher =

English footballer

Personal information
- Date of birth: 15 June 1953 (age 73)
- Place of birth: Chester, England
- Position: Striker

Senior career*
Years	Team	Apps	(Gls)
1971–1973	Chester	10	(0)
- Skelmersdale United
- * Club domestic league appearances and goals

Graham Futcher (born 15 June 1953) is a former professional footballer who played in the Football League his hometown club Chester. He is best known as the oldest of three brothers to play for the club during this period.

A forward, Futcher came through Chester's youth ranks and made his first-team debut as an 18-year-old in a Football League Cup tie against Tranmere Rovers in August 1971. His Football League debut followed two months later at Cambridge United, the first of ten appearances over the next two seasons.

Futcher played his last game for Chester in a 1–0 defeat at Lincoln City in March 1973, two weeks before younger brother Paul made his debut for the club. Paul's twin Ron would also go on to play for the first-team the following season and both Paul and Ron would go on to enjoy long careers in the higher levels. Graham did not enjoy such success and he joined Skelmersdale United and later Christleton FC, never playing professional football again.

Graham is the uncle of ex-Wrexham player Stephen Futcher, Fulham midfielder Danny Murphy and Bury defender Ben Futcher.
