= Ben Futcher =

English footballer & coach

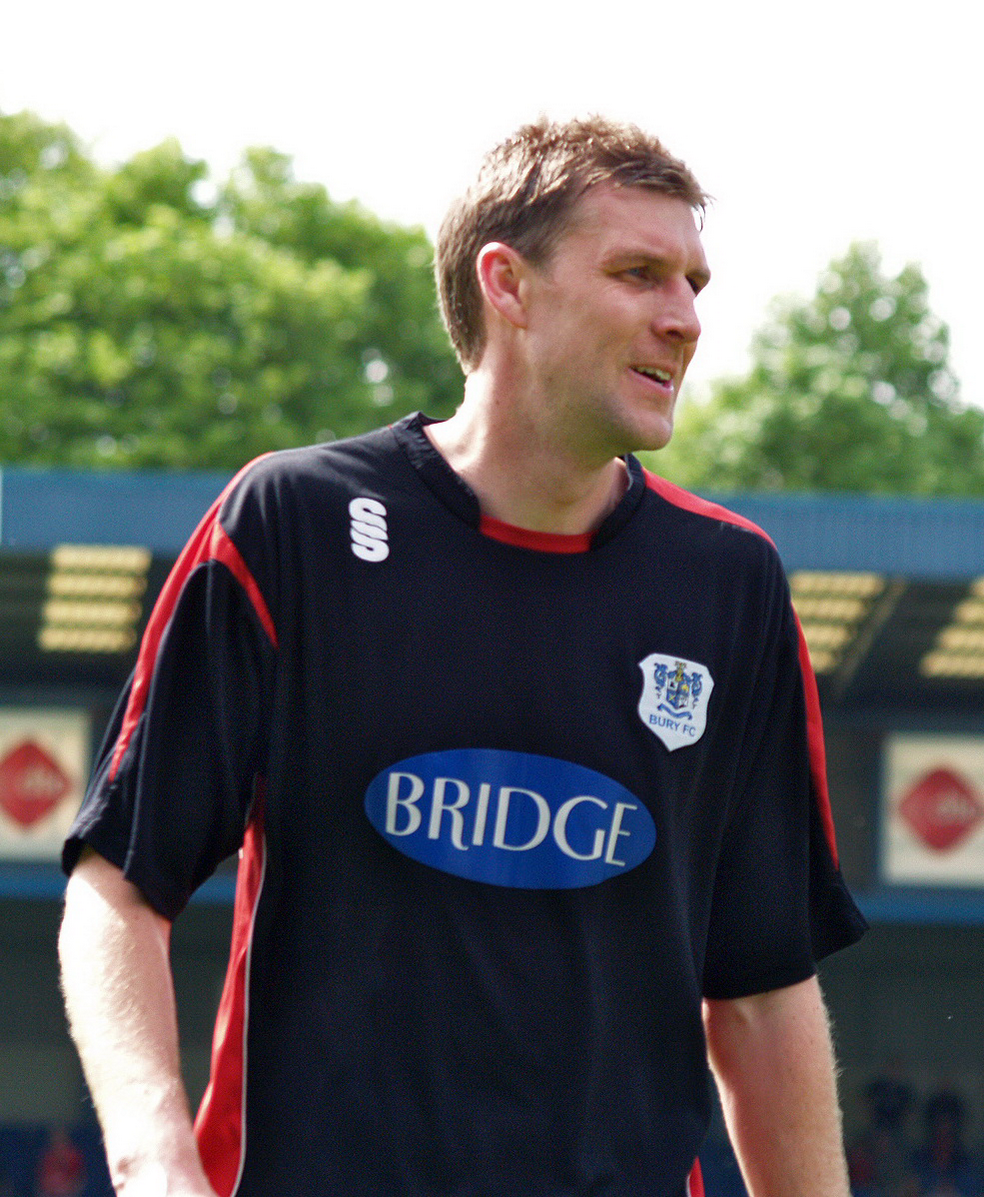
- Futcher with Bury in 2009

Personal information
- Full name: Benjamin Paul Futcher
- Date of birth: 20 February 1981 (age 45)
- Place of birth: Manchester, England
- Position: Centre-back

Youth career
- Oldham Athletic

Senior career*
Years	Team	Apps	(Gls)
1999–2002	Oldham Athletic	10	(0)
2001	→ Stalybridge Celtic (loan)	17	(1)
2002	Stalybridge Celtic	9	(0)
2002	Doncaster Rovers	2	(0)
2002–2005	Lincoln City	126	(14)
2005–2006	Boston United	14	(0)
2006	Grimsby Town	22	(3)
2006–2007	Peterborough United	25	(3)
2007–2013	Bury	119	(3)
2010–2011	→ Oxford United (loan)	6	(0)
2011	→ Mansfield Town (loan)	13	(1)
2012	→ AFC Telford United (loan)	3	(0)
2012	→ Macclesfield Town (loan)	10	(0)
2012	→ FC Halifax Town (loan)	0	(0)
Total		376	(25)

Managerial career
- 2012: Bury (joint-caretaker)
- 2023–2026: England U20
- 2024: England U21 (interim)
- 2026 -: England U19
- * Club domestic league appearances and goals

Benjamin Paul Futcher (born 20 February 1981) is an English football coach and former professional footballer, he works for the Football Association as a youth coach developer. He is the head coach of the England U19s.

As a player, he was a centre-back from 1999 to 2013 notably playing for Lincoln City between 2002 and 2005 where he played in two play-off finals. He has also played for Oldham Athletic, Stalybridge Celtic, Doncaster Rovers, Boston United, Grimsby Town, Peterborough United, Bury, Oxford United, Mansfield Town, AFC Telford United, Macclesfield Town and FC Halifax Town. He is the son of former professional footballer, defender Paul Futcher.

He was assistant manager of Mansfield Town, following his then-manager at Swindon Town, David Flitcroft, who was appointed to Mansfield Town on 1 March 2018, until the contracts of both were terminated 14 May 2019.

== Club career ==
=== Oldham Athletic ===
Futcher started off playing for Oldham Athletic, signing professional terms in July 1999. Futcher struggled to grasp first team opportunities at Boundary Park and in August 2001 was made available for a loan transfer to gain experience. He linked up with Stalybridge Celtic, the club being managed by his father Paul, where he spent three months on loan, making 17 appearances and scoring once. On 3 January 2002 his contract with the Latics was cancelled by mutual consent.

=== Stalybridge Celtic and Doncaster Rovers ===
It was to be Stalybridge who Ben would sign for permanently in the January transfer window of 2002. Futcher went on to play in ten games for the Celtic, before joining fellow Conference side Doncaster Rovers.

=== Lincoln City ===
After playing in only two games for Rovers, manager Dave Penney released Futcher two months later at the end of the season. On 10 May 2002, he along with Dene Cropper became Lincoln City manager Keith Alexander's first signings of his second spell in charge at Sincil Bank. With The Imps struggling in the previous season, it was to be a different story in the new season, and despite a rocky start, Lincoln climbed the league, and with the help of Futcher and his goals, the Imps qualified for the play-offs. Ben finished the season as the club's top goal scorer, scoring eleven goals, the majority of them being close range headers from set pieces. In recognition of this he was voted "Young Player of the Season" by the club's management team. A Simon Yeo inspired Lincoln dumped Scunthorpe United out of the Play-off semi-final and thus giving them the task of overcoming AFC Bournemouth in the final at the Millennium Stadium. Lincoln lost the match 5–2, with Ben amongst the City scorers. For the next two years, Futcher was at the heart of the Lincoln defence and faced two more Play-off defeats: losing out in the semi-finals to Huddersfield Town in 2003/2004 and going down 2–0 after extra time against Southend United the following season in yet another final at the Millennium Stadium.

=== Boston United ===
In a shock move in the summer of 2005, Futcher announced he would be leaving Lincoln, to sign for county rivals Boston United. With United boasting such ex-Premiership stars as Julian Joachim and Noel Whelan Bostons squad was arguably equipped to combat the league, but the club struggled to live up to its expectancies, and performances saw them hover around the relegation zone. On 12 January 2006, Futcher called time on his Boston career, and moved onto yet another Lincolnshire club.

=== Grimsby Town ===
This time he signed with promotion challenging Grimsby Town, who bolstered their squad as well with the signing of Curtis Woodhouse for the final promotion push. Futcher found it rather hard to break into the Grimsby side and often had to play second fiddle to Justin Whittle and Rob Jones. The Mariners, missed out on automatic promotion on the last day of the season, and this set them up with a Play-off semi final tie against Ben's former team, Lincoln City, who were now in the play-off's for the fourth season running. After a 1–0 Grimsby victory at Sincil Bank, Futcher scored in a 2–1 win in the leg at Blundell Park to send Grimsby into the final at Cardiff. The Mariners however failed to earn promotion, losing to Cheltenham Town in the final, thus meaning Futcher had now been on the losing team in a League Two play-off final, 3 times in the past 4 seasons.

=== Peterborough United ===
Ben then went and signed a contract with Peterborough United. Futcher linked up with Keith Alexander, once again but United achieved nothing that season, and with the installation of Darren Ferguson as manager, following Alexander's departure, Futcher left at the end of that season.

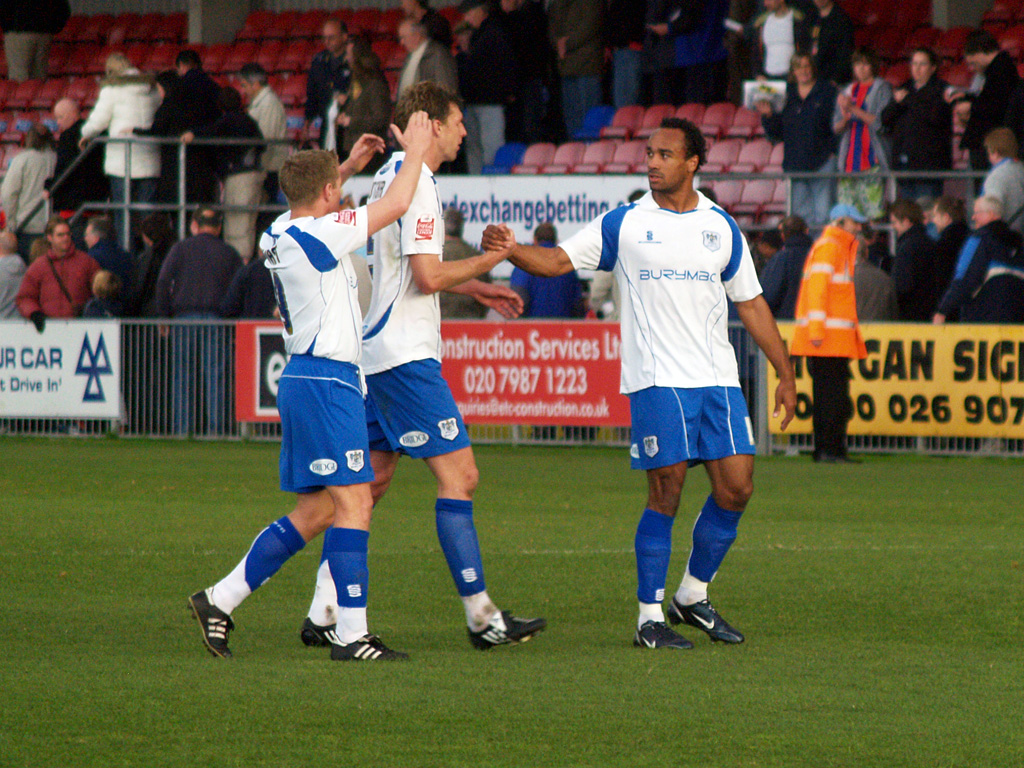
Futcher (centre) at Bury with teammates Glynn Hurst and Chris O'Grady

=== Bury ===
His next port of call was to sign for Bury where Alexander had just been appointed as the club's Director of Football. In Ben's first season, he helped the club to a mid table finish, and scored Bury's first goal in a 2–1 victory over Leeds United in the Football League Trophy. In the next season he became an integral part of the Bury team and at the end of the season the club activated a clause in his contract for Ben to stay for another year.

On 11 November 2010 Ben signed for fellow Football League Two side Oxford United on loan. He returned to Bury on 4 January 2011 having played six games during his eight-week loan period. After his return he played more regularly for the team, and in May 2011 he signed a new one-year contract extension. In August 2011 he joined Mansfield Town on loan for an initial month. In January 2012 he joined AFC Telford United on loan, making his club debut on 21 January against Cambridge United.

In May 2012 he was offered a new contract by Bury as a player/development coach. On 2 July 2012 he signed with Conference North club FC Halifax Town on a season long loan deal. However a few weeks after signing for Halifax he was recalled to Bury without making a first team appearance as he was appointed joint-caretaker manager at the club.

== Coaching career ==
Futcher was appointed Player/Development coach in the summer of 2012, however he reverted to his coaching priorities after not being handed a squad number for the 2012–13 season. Futcher assisted Peter Shirtliff as joint-caretaker manager before the appointment of Kevin Blackwell. In June 2015 Futcher was made Assistant Manager to David Flitcroft after Chris Brass was made Head of Football Operations. In June 2017 he was appointed assistant manager of Swindon Town, and followed Flitcroft to Mansfield Town on 1 March 2018 until 14 May 2019.

Futcher now works for The Football Association as a youth coach developer.

On 9 August 2024, Futcher stepped up to take interim charge of the England U21 squad following Lee Carsley's own interim appointment with the senior side.

On 9 September 2026, Futcher took charge of the England U19s after three years leading the U20 squad.

== Personal life ==
Ben is the son of ex-Manchester City, Oldham Athletic, Luton Town, Grimsby Town and Barnsley defender Paul Futcher. Other footballing members of Ben's family include his uncles Ron Futcher and Graham Futcher (both ex-Chester), cousins Danny Murphy (England international) and Stephen Futcher (ex-Wrexham). Futcher is studying part-time for a bachelor's degree in Sports Performance at the University of Salford.

In January 2011 Futcher was rocked by the death of close friend and former Lincoln and Macclesfield teammate Richard Butcher, in September 2012 he still claimed he is still affected by the passing of Butcher.

== Career statistics ==
Club	Season	League			FA Cup		League Cup		Other		Total	
Club	Season	Division	Apps	Goals	Apps	Goals	Apps	Goals	Apps	Goals	Apps	Goals
Oldham Athletic	1999–2000	Second Division	5	0	1	0	0	0	0	0	6	0
Oldham Athletic	2000–01	Second Division	5	0	0	0	0	0	0	0	5	0
Oldham Athletic	Total		10	0	1	0	0	0	0	0	11	0
Stalybridge Celtic (loan)	2001–02	Conference	17	1	0	0	0	0	0	0	17	1
Staylybridge Celtic	2001–02	Conference	9	0	0	0	0	0	1 (Note: Appearance(s) in FA Trophy)	0	10	0
Staylybridge Celtic	Total		26	1	0	0	0	0	1	0	27	1
Doncaster Rovers	2001–02	Conference	2	0	0	0	0	0	0	0	2	0
Lincoln City	2002–03	Third Division	46 (Note: Three appearances in 2003 EFL League Two play-offs)	9 (Note: One goal in 2003 EFL League Two play-offs)	1	1	0	0	2	1 (Note: Goal(s) in FA Trophy)	49	11
Lincoln City	2003–04	Third Division	45	3	2	0	1	0	3	0	51	3
Lincoln City	2004–05	League Two	38	3	1	0	2	0	1	0	42	3
Lincoln City	Total		129	15	4	1	3	0	6	1	142	17
Boston United F.C.	2005–06	League Two	14	0	3	1	0	0	2	0	19	1
Grimsby Town	2005-06	League Two	18	3	0	0	0	0	0	0	18	3
Grimsby Town	2006–07	League Two	4	0	0	0	0	0	0	0	4	0
Grimsby Town	Total		22	3	0	0	0	0	0	0	22	3
Peterborough United	2006–07	League Two	25	3	3	0	0	0	2	0	30	3
Bury	2007–08	League Two	40	0	4	1	1	0	2	1	47	2
Bury	2008–09	League Two	36	2	0	0	1	0	2	0	39	2
Bury	2009–10	League Two	32	0	1	0	1	0	3	0	37	0
Bury	2010–11	League Two	11	1	0	0	0	0	2	0	13	1
Bury	Total		119	3	5	1	3	0	9	1	136	5
Oxford United(loan)	2010–11	League Two	6	0	0	0	0	0	0	0	6	0
Mansfield Town(loan)	2011–12	Conference	13	1	0	0	0	0	0	0	13	1
Telford (loan)	2011–12	Conference	3	0	0	0	0	0	0	0	3	0
Macclesfield (loan)	2011–12	League Two	10	0	0	0	0	0	0	0	10	0
Career total			379	26	16	3	6	0	20	2	421	31
