= Danny Murphy (footballer, born 1977) =

English footballer

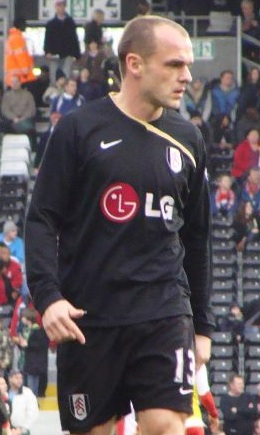
- Murphy playing for Fulham in 2008

Personal information
- Full name: Daniel Ben Murphy
- Date of birth: 18 March 1977 (age 49)
- Place of birth: Chester, England
- Height: 5 ft 9 in (1.75 m)
- Position: Midfielder

Youth career
- –1993: Crewe Alexandra

Senior career*
Years	Team	Apps	(Gls)
1993–1997	Crewe Alexandra	134	(27)
1997–2004	Liverpool	170	(25)
1999	→ Crewe Alexandra (loan)	16	(1)
2004–2006	Charlton Athletic	56	(7)
2006–2007	Tottenham Hotspur	22	(1)
2007–2012	Fulham	169	(17)
2012–2013	Blackburn Rovers	33	(1)
Total		600	(79)

International career
1994–1995	England U18	7	(5)
1997	England U20	4	(3)
1997–2000	England U21	5	(0)
2001–2003	England	9	(1)
- * Club domestic league appearances and goals

Daniel Ben Murphy (born 18 March 1977) is an English former professional footballer who played as a midfielder.

Murphy began his career with Crewe Alexandra in 1993 before moving to Liverpool in 1997. With Liverpool, he won the League Cup, FA Cup and UEFA Cup. After brief spells at Charlton Athletic and Tottenham Hotspur he joined Fulham, which he helped reach the 2010 UEFA Europa League final, and ended his career at Blackburn Rovers. He served as captain at his last two clubs.

Murphy made nine appearances for the England national team from his debut in 2001, scoring once.

== Club career ==
=== Early life and career ===
Daniel Ben Murphy was born on 18 March 1977 in Chester, Cheshire. He started his career as a trainee at Crewe Alexandra. Murphy praised the role of Crewe manager Dario Gradi in his footballing education, considering him as his mentor. In November 2016, as the United Kingdom football sexual abuse scandal erupted, Murphy also strongly defended Gradi's reputation.

Murphy made his first-team debut for Crewe as a 16-year-old on 7 December 1993, coming on as a substitute in a 3–2 away win over Bradford City in the Football League Trophy. He scored on his home debut, with the winner in a 4–3 home win against Preston North End in the league. Murphy generally played as a deep-lying forward for Crewe, scoring several spectacular long range and set piece goals. While at Gresty Road, Murphy formed a prolific partnership with striker Dele Adebola.

Murphy helped Crewe earn promotion to the second tier of English football for the first time since 1896, as Crewe finished third in the Second Division, before going on to beat Brentford 1–0 at Wembley Stadium in the 1997 play-off final.

=== Liverpool ===
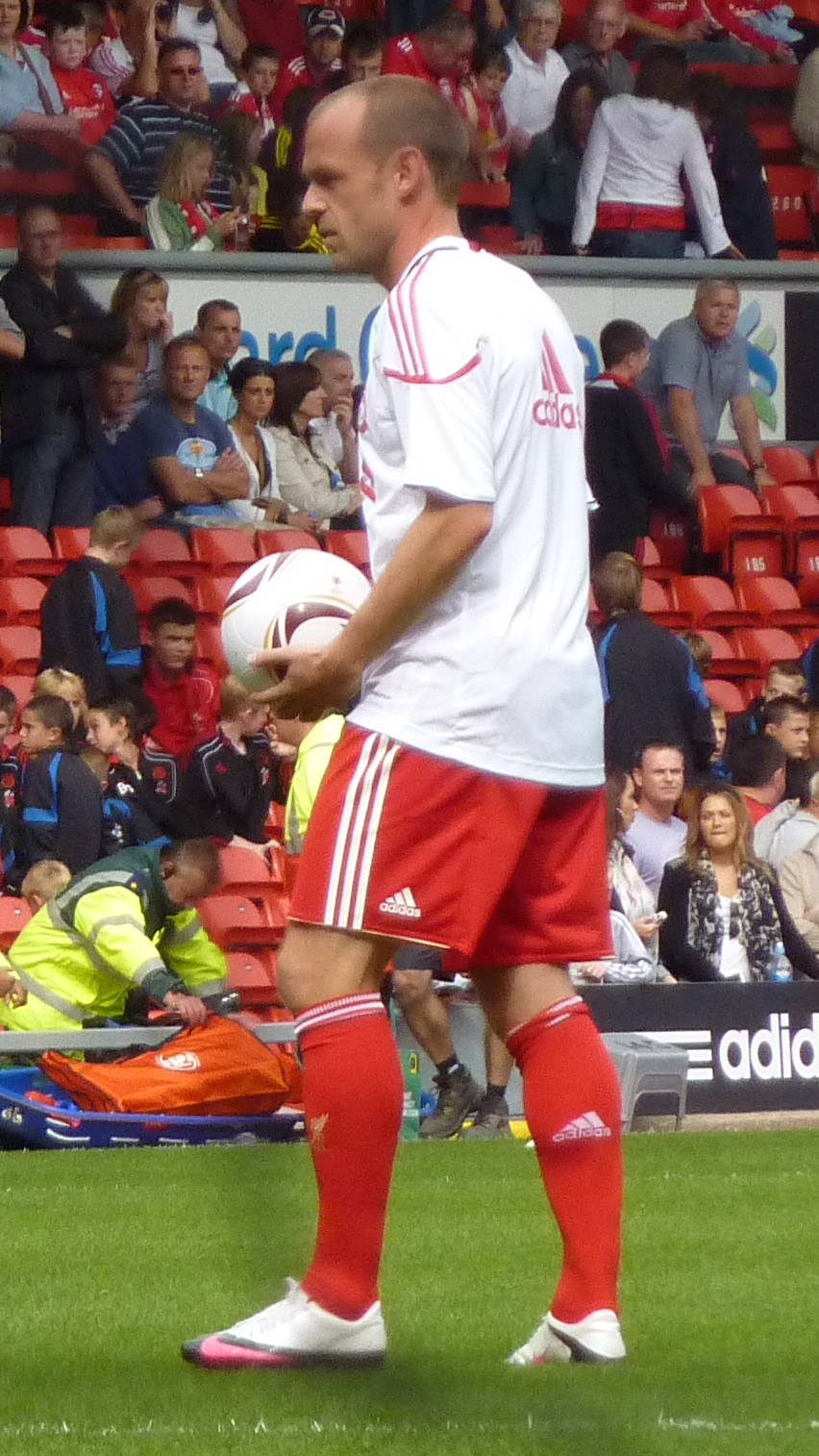
Murphy in Liverpool kit during Jamie Carragher's testimonial match in 2010

Murphy signed for Premier League club Liverpool in 1997 for an initial fee of £1.5 million. He made his debut as a substitute on the opening day of the 1997–98 season in a draw with Wimbledon. However, he did not break into the team immediately and, after making just one league appearance for the club during the following season, he returned to Crewe on loan, during which he helped save his old club from relegation. After the loan period ended, he went on to become a regular at Liverpool.

Though naturally a central midfielder, Murphy often played as a wide midfielder due to competition for places, particularly from Steven Gerrard and Dietmar Hamann. Murphy's career at Liverpool included a cup treble in 2001 (FA Cup, UEFA Cup and League Cup), a Premier League second-place finish in 2002, and the League Cup in 2003. During the 2001–02 season, when he established himself as a key member of the side, Liverpool's assistant manager Phil Thompson praised Murphy, citing his versatility and describing him as 'probably the most tactically aware player that we have.' Although the 2002–03 season was overall a disappointing one for Liverpool, with the club dropping to fifth in the table, Murphy had a fine individual campaign which saw him score 12 goals and be voted the supporters' player of the season. He also started the 2003 League Cup final as Liverpool beat Manchester United, having missed the 2001 final due to injury.

He developed a habit of scoring the deciding goal in 1–0 wins away to Manchester United, a feat he achieved three times in four seasons (2000–01, 2001–02 and 2003–04).

=== Charlton Athletic ===
Murphy signed for Charlton Athletic in August 2004 on a four-year contract for a fee of £2.5 million. In his first season at Charlton, Murphy struggled to recapture the form that he had shown at Liverpool. However, in the first three months of the 2005–06 season he emerged as a viable option for England once more, and also won the Premier League Player of the Month award for September, scoring several goals along the way.

=== Tottenham Hotspur ===
On 31 January 2006, Murphy signed for Tottenham Hotspur for a fee of £2 million. He appeared only fleetingly in the remaining games of the season.

Murphy scored his first Tottenham goal in a 2–1 win over Portsmouth on 1 October 2006 after only 39 seconds of the game. He was unable to establish himself as a regular at Tottenham, but made clear later that despite reports in the media, there was no disagreement between him and Jol.

=== Fulham ===
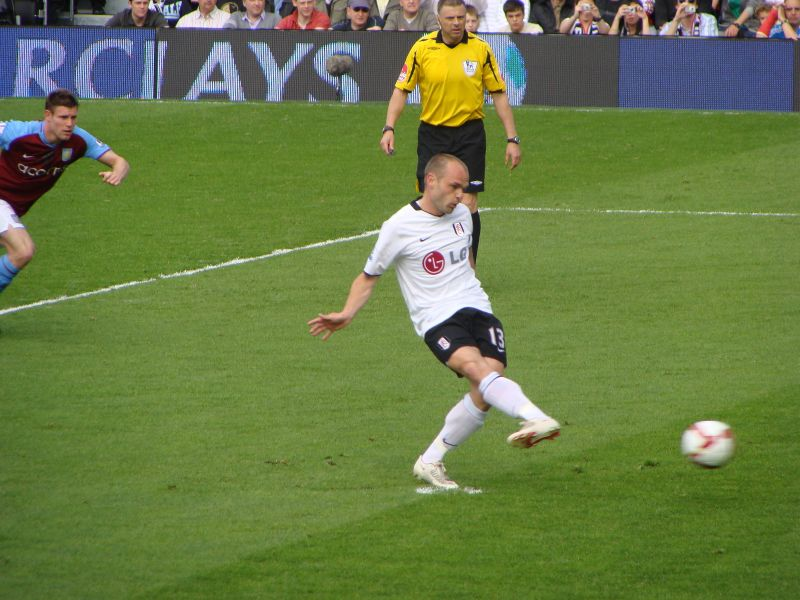
Murphy taking a penalty kick for Fulham in 2009

Fulham took over Murphy's Tottenham contract on 31 August 2007. He cemented himself as a regular starter, kept his place in the team throughout the season and scored six goals in 43 matches. One goal, a rare header scored on 11 May 2008, gave Fulham a 1–0 win away at Portsmouth and ensured their Premier League survival. Following the match, Murphy highlighted manager Roy Hodgson's "key role" in the team's avoiding relegation. Murphy signed a new one-year contract, with an option for a further year, at the end of the season, and was appointed club captain for the 2008–09 season.

On 9 November 2008, Murphy scored his 100th goal at club level with a penalty kick, as Fulham beat Newcastle United 2–1. Murphy scored another penalty as, for the first time in 45 years, Fulham beat title-chasing Manchester United at home.

The year's option on Murphy's contract was taken up during the season, but in August 2009, amid reported interest from clubs including Birmingham City and Stoke City, he signed another extension, until June 2011. Murphy missed two months in the early part of the season with a knee ligament problem, but went on to captain Fulham to their first European final. They eliminated opponents including Juventus, defending champions Shakhtar Donetsk, Bundesliga champions VfL Wolfsburg, and Hamburger SV to reach the 2010 UEFA Europa League final. Ahead of the semi-final, Murphy said that just reaching the final "would be one of the greatest achievements of our history". Fulham lost 2–1 to Atlético Madrid to a goal scored just four minutes from the end of extra time.

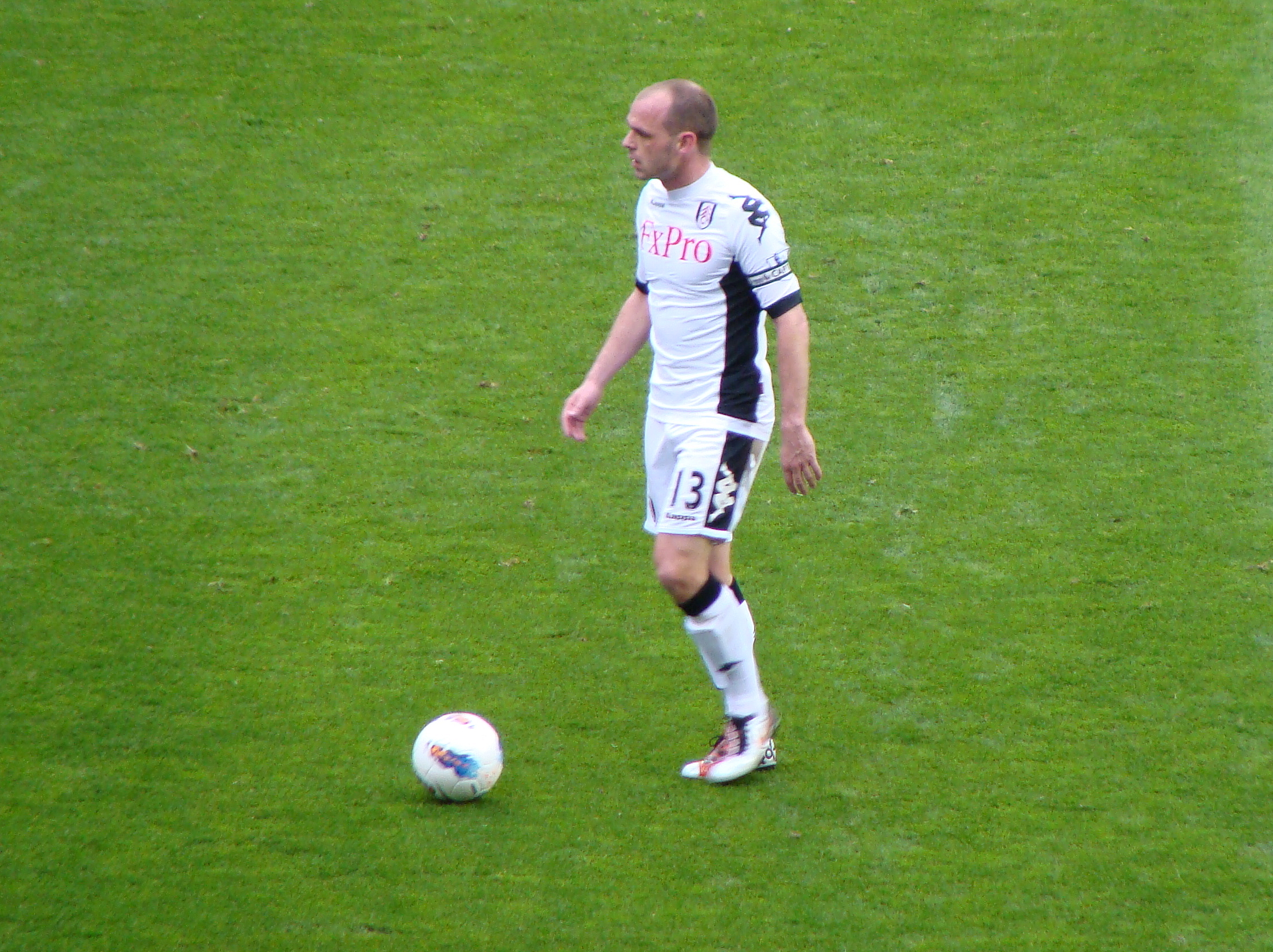
Murphy playing for Fulham in 2012

The 2010–11 season started without Hodgson, who left for Liverpool, and was replaced by Mark Hughes. In October, Murphy made a controversial comment about managers responsible for dangerous tackles made by players. His comment was supported by some, but received heavy criticisms from other managers. In response to these criticisms, Murphy said his comments "were blown out of all proportion". In late-January 2011, Murphy signed another contract extension to keep him as Fulham until June 2012. Just one day after signing a new contract, Murphy scored his first goal of the season and then another, as Fulham beat his former club Tottenham 4–0 in the fourth round of the FA Cup. Murphy was praised by Manager Mark Hughes for helping the club turn things around and avoid relegation.

Ahead of the 2011–12 season, Murphy believed he could play a major role and declared himself "fitter than ever". After making forty-nine appearances and scoring seven times in all competitions, he was released by Fulham at the end of the season as he and Martin Jol, who had replaced Hodgson's successor, Hughes, could not agree on a contract extension. In his last season at Fulham, Murphy created more goalscoring chances than any other player in the top-flight.

=== Blackburn Rovers ===
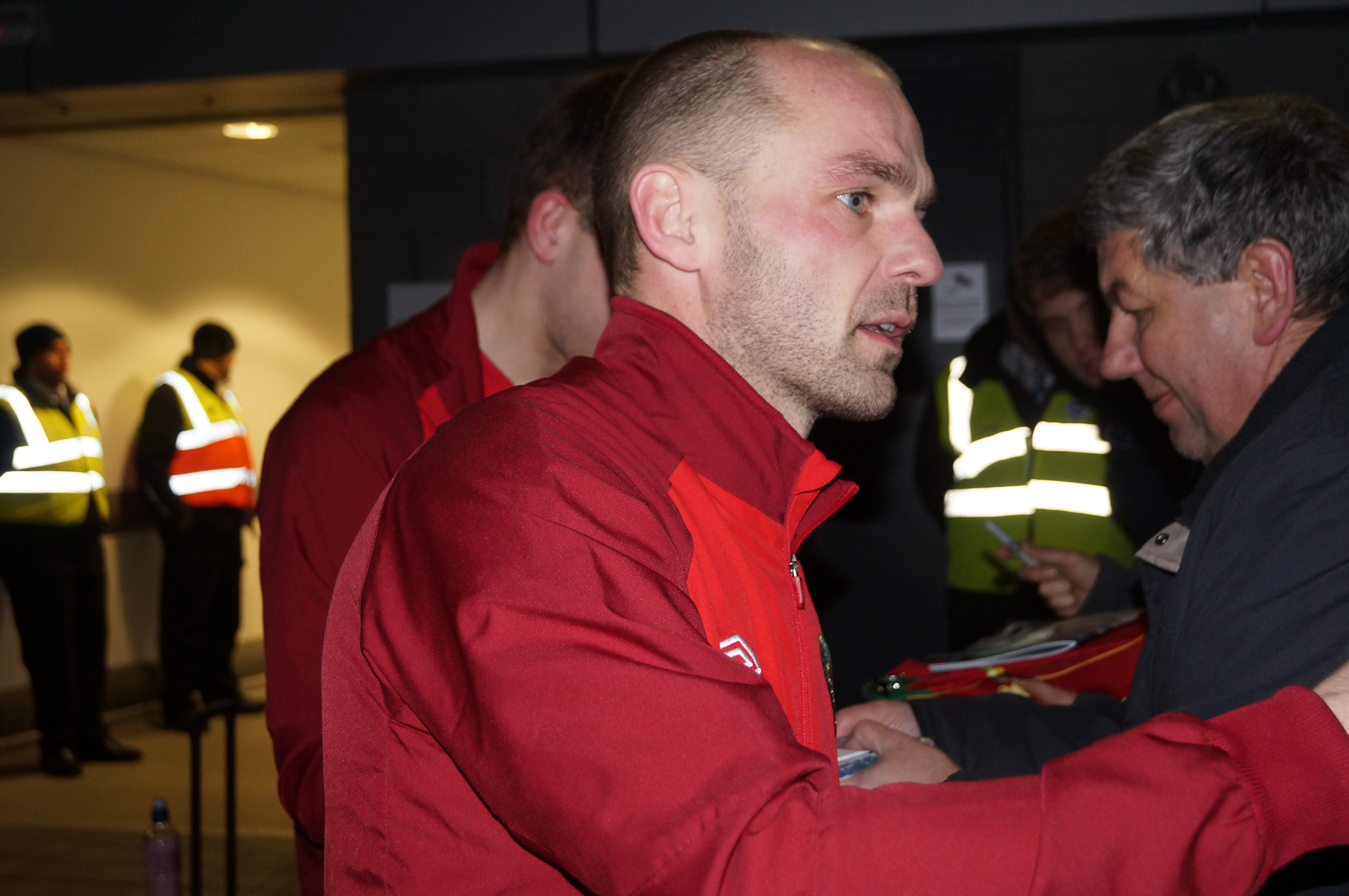
Murphy signing autographs at Blackburn Rovers in 2013

On 25 June 2012, Murphy signed for Championship club Blackburn Rovers on a two-year contract. He said that he moved to Blackburn to play regularly and that it was the right time to leave Fulham. He scored his first goal for Blackburn in a 2–2 draw with Huddersfield Town on 6 November 2012. In March 2013, Murphy was succeeded as Blackburn captain by Scott Dann. On 1 July, Murphy had his contract terminated by mutual consent despite being willing to stay at the club for another season. While at the club, Murphy was praised by manager Gary Bowyer for his assistance during Bowyer's management career at Blackburn.

== International career ==
Murphy scored on his debut for the England national under-18 team on 24 July 1994, in a 3–3 draw away to Norway in a friendly, which he entered as a substitute. He made his first start two days later in a 3–2 home win over the same opposition in another friendly. He finished his under-18 career with seven appearances and five goals from 1994 to 1995.

Murphy was part of the England under-20 team at the 1997 FIFA World Youth Championship in Malaysia, and made his debut at that level when starting England's first match at the tournament, a 2–1 win over the Ivory Coast on 18 June 1997. He scored a hat-trick two days later in England's next match, a 5–0 win over the United Arab Emirates. All four of Murphy's appearances for the under-20s came at this tournament, in which England were eliminated on 26 June after losing 2–1 to Argentina in the round of 16.

Murphy made his debut for the England under-21 team on 9 September 1997 with a start in a 1–0 home win over Moldova in 1998 UEFA European Under-21 Championship qualification. He was in the squad for the 2000 UEFA European Under-21 Championship in Slovakia, playing in all three of England's matches as they were eliminated in the group stage. He made five appearances for the under-21s from 1997 to 2000.

Murphy played nine times for the England senior team and scored one goal between 2001 and 2003. He made his debut on 10 November 2001 as a 58th-minute substitute in a 1–1 draw at home to Sweden in a friendly. He scored his only goal on 17 April 2002 in a 4–0 home victory over Paraguay in a friendly with a deflected shot. Murphy was called up to England's squad for the 2002 FIFA World Cup in South Korea and Japan as a replacement for the injured Steven Gerrard, but had to withdraw after he suffered a foot injury.

== Post-playing career ==
On 18 August 2013, Murphy appeared as a pundit on the BBC programme Match of the Day. He announced his retirement as a player on 10 October, with the intention of continuing his media work and completing his coaching badges. He established a career as a pundit on the UK radio station Talksport.

== Personal life ==
Murphy is the nephew of former footballers Paul Futcher, Graham Futcher and Ron Futcher, and is the cousin of Ben Futcher. Murphy married actress Joanna Taylor in 2004. They have two children. The couple separated in 2017.

In 2024, Murphy revealed that after his football career had ended he had struggled with no longer having football in his life and had turned to cocaine and cannabis to help him cope, at one point becoming addicted to cocaine.

Murphy previously owned a cat named Bob. He recited the story of Bob during commentary during the 2026 FIFA World Cup, telling listeners that Bob jumped in a Royal Mail van and was lost. He clarified in a later match that Bob returned six or seven weeks later, but was feral — leading him to send the cat to live with his friend's parents in Preston.

== Career statistics ==
=== Club ===
Appearances and goals by club, season and competition
Club	Season	League			FA Cup		League Cup		Europe		Other		Total	
Club	Season	Division	Apps	Goals	Apps	Goals	Apps	Goals	Apps	Goals	Apps	Goals	Apps	Goals
Crewe Alexandra	1993–94	Third Division	12	2	0	0	0	0	—		2 (Note: Appearances in Football League Trophy)	1	14	3
Crewe Alexandra	1994–95	Second Division	35	5	0	0	1	0	—		5 (Note: Three appearances in Football League Trophy, two in Second Division play-offs)	0	41	5
Crewe Alexandra	1995–96	Second Division	42	10	3	1	4	0	—		4 (Note: Three appearances and one goal in Football League Trophy, one appearance in Second Division play-offs)	1	53	12
Crewe Alexandra	1996–97	Second Division	45	10	4	3	2	0	—		6 (Note: Three appearances and two goals in Football League Trophy, three appearances in Second Division play-offs)	2	57	15
Crewe Alexandra	Total		134	27	7	4	7	0	—		17	4	165	35
Liverpool	1997–98	Premier League	16	0	1	0	0	0	—		—		17	0
Liverpool	1998–99	Premier League	1	0	0	0	2	0	1 (Note: Appearance(s) in UEFA Cup)	0	—		4	0
Liverpool	1999–2000	Premier League	23	3	2	0	2	3	—		—		27	6
Liverpool	2000–01	Premier League	27	4	5	1	5	4	10	1	—		47	10
Liverpool	2001–02	Premier League	36	6	2	0	1	0	15 (Note: Appearances in UEFA Champions League)	2	2 (Note: One appearance in FA Charity Shield, one in UEFA Super Cup)	0	56	8
Liverpool	2002–03	Premier League	36	7	3	1	4	2	12 (Note: Six appearances and one goal in UEFA Champions League, six appearances and one goal in UEFA Cup)	2	1 (Note: Appearance in FA Community Shield)	0	56	12
Liverpool	2003–04	Premier League	31	5	2	1	2	2	7	0	—		42	8
Liverpool	Total		170	25	15	3	16	11	45	5	3	0	249	44
Crewe Alexandra (loan)	1998–99	First Division	16	1	—		—		—		—		16	1
Charlton Athletic	2004–05	Premier League	38	3	3	1	2	1	—		—		43	5
Charlton Athletic	2005–06	Premier League	18	4	0	0	3	1	—		—		21	5
Charlton Athletic	Total		56	7	3	1	5	2	—		—		64	10
Tottenham Hotspur	2005–06	Premier League	10	0	—		—		—		—		10	0
Tottenham Hotspur	2006–07	Premier League	12	1	1	0	3	0	3	0	—		19	1
Tottenham Hotspur	Total		22	1	1	0	3	0	3	0	—		29	1
Fulham	2007–08	Premier League	33	5	1	1	1	0	—		—		35	6
Fulham	2008–09	Premier League	38	5	5	1	1	1	—		—		44	7
Fulham	2009–10	Premier League	25	5	3	0	0	0	13 (Note: Appearances in UEFA Europa League)	2	—		41	7
Fulham	2010–11	Premier League	37	0	3	2	2	0	—		—		42	2
Fulham	2011–12	Premier League	36	2	2	1	0	0	11	3	—		49	6
Fulham	Total		169	17	14	5	4	1	24	5	—		211	28
Blackburn Rovers	2012–13	Championship	33	1	2	1	0	0	—		—		35	2
Career total			600	79	42	14	35	14	72	10	20	4	769	121

=== International ===
Appearances and goals by national team and year
National team	Year	Apps	Goals
England	2001	1	0
England	2002	4	1
England	2003	4	0
Total		9	1

England score listed first, score column indicates score after each Murphy goal

List of international goals scored by Danny Murphy
No.	Date	Venue	Cap	Opponent	Score	Result	Competition	Ref.
1	17 April 2002	Anfield, Liverpool, England	3	Paraguay	2–0	4–0	Friendly	

== Honours ==
Crewe Alexandra

- Football League Third Division third-place promotion: 1993–94
- Football League Second Division play-offs: 1997

Liverpool

- FA Cup: 2000–01
- Football League Cup: 2002–03
- FA Charity Shield: 2001
- UEFA Cup: 2000–01
- UEFA Super Cup: 2001

Fulham

- UEFA Europa League runner-up: 2009–10

Individual

- PFA Team of the Year: 1996–97 Second Division
- Liverpool Player of the Season: 2002–03
- Premier League Player of the Month: November 2001, September 2005
