= Paul Futcher =

English footballer (1956–2016)

Personal information
- Full name: Paul Futcher
- Date of birth: 25 September 1956
- Place of birth: Chester, England
- Date of death: 23 November 2016 (aged 60)
- Place of death: Sheffield, England
- Height: 6 ft 0 in (1.83 m)
- Position: Centre back

Senior career*
Years	Team	Apps	(Gls)
1972–1973	Chester City	20	(0)
1974–1977	Luton Town	131	(1)
1978–1979	Manchester City	37	(0)
1980–1982	Oldham Athletic	98	(1)
1982–1983	Derby County	35	(0)
1984–1990	Barnsley	230	(0)
1990	Halifax Town	15	(0)
1991–1994	Grimsby Town	132	(0)
1994–1995	Dundalk		
1995	Droylsden		
1995–1997	Gresley Rovers		
1997–2000	Southport	65	(0)
Total		763	(2)

International career
1976–1978	England Under-21s	11	(0)

Managerial career
- 1995: Darlington
- 1995–1997: Gresley Rovers (player)
- 1997–2000: Southport (player)
- 2001–2002: Stalybridge Celtic
- 2005: Ashton United
- * Club domestic league appearances and goals

Paul Futcher (25 September 1956 – 23 November 2016) was an English professional footballer who had a distinguished career as a defender in the English Football League, for England under 21s and as manager of several non-league clubs.

He is regarded as a club legend by Grimsby Town who signed him at the age of 35 when he was apparently past his best. He went on to be described as one of the club's greatest ever players. Prior to his time with Grimsby he had enjoyed lengthy spells with Luton Town, Oldham Athletic and Barnsley as well as playing for Chester, Manchester City, Derby County and Halifax Town. After leaving Grimsby in 1994 he played for Dundalk before moving into management.

Most of Paul Futcher's football was played at Barnsley FC where he is still remembered fondly by Red's fans.

== Playing career ==
Futcher was the defensive half of twin brothers. His brother was centre-forward Ron.

Futcher began his career with hometown club Chester, who he made his debut for as a 16-year-old against Cambridge United in March 1973. This came just a fortnight after his older brother Graham had played his final game for the club and seven months before Ron made his debut for the Blues. Futcher quickly turned professional and had made 20 Football League appearances when Luton Town snapped him up for £100,000 in the summer of 1974. Ron joined him on the journey south, where Paul was to play more than 140 games and won ten England under 21 caps.

Futcher became Manchester City's record signing for £350,000 on 1 June 1978. He replaced club stalwart Tommy Booth in the side which failed to live up to expectations and as the major new signing he attracted criticism. Booth won his place back, and on 1 July 1979 Futcher left Maine Road for a fee of £150,000 and joined Second Division Oldham Athletic.

Futcher had twice been chosen for the England squad and each time a road accident had put paid to him fulfilling the invitation. Futcher signed for Barnsley in a double deal with Calvin Plummer from Derby County, and the following Saturday both made their debuts against there former side in a 5- 1 victory for Barnsley. Futcher is regarded as one of Barnsley greatest ever centre halves. Futcher was signed by Grimsby Town from Halifax Town reserves, aged 34, by Alan Buckley for £10,000 as a short-term replacement for Andy Tillson. He went on to be a fans' favourite for five seasons, winning the Supporters Player of the Year twice in that time. Then his son Ben Futcher joined the club for their League Two play-off final season of 2005–06 before he left for Peterborough United.

During his time at Grimsby, Futcher was held in high esteem by the club's supporters. Following the arrival of Brian Laws as manager and a poor performance in a match against Oldham Athletic, he departed in 1994, but remains thought of as one of the club's best-ever players.

He later played for Dundalk where he played in UEFA Cup Qualifying Round against Malmo.

== Management and coaching ==
=== Gresley Rovers ===
Futcher led Rovers to the Dr. Martens Premier Division championship in 1997; they were not promoted to the Conference because their ground failed to meet Conference standards. During this time, they regularly played against now EFL League One club, Burton Albion, often beating them.

=== Southport ===
The highlight of his two-and-a-half-year stint with Southport was the club's FA Trophy final outing in 1998, where at 41; Futcher became the oldest player to appear in a competitive Wembley final.

The Sandgrounders narrowly lost to Cheltenham Town, and the remainder of the former Manchester City man's Haig Avenue tenure was blemished by successful relegation scraps.

=== Ashton United ===
Futcher was unable to save the Robins from relegation to the Northern Premier League. He subsequently failed to motivate the squad (using nearly 50 players in 10 months) and left in December 2005.

== Personal life and death ==
Futcher's twin brother Ron played in the Football League playing alongside Paul at Barnsley FC as well as being a top scorer in the North American Soccer League; and their older brother Graham also played professionally at Chester City. Paul's son Ben has extensive Football League experience. He is also the uncle of former Premier League midfielder Danny Murphy.

On 23 November 2016, Futcher died of cancer. Gary Sweet, the Chief Executive of his former club Luton Town, described him as "up there with the very best I've ever seen play for the Club", adding that Futcher would "live long in the memory of anyone who saw him play."

A minute's silence was observed at Grimsby's next fixture a 3–2 away defeat at Crawley Town. Whilst Grimsby also announced they would hold a minutes applause for him in their next home game against Portsmouth.

== Honours ==
=== As player ===
Grimsby Town

- Third Division third place promotion: 1990–91

Individual

- Barnsley Player of the Year: 1984–85, 1988–89
- Grimsby Town Supporters Player of the Year: 1991–92, 1992–93

=== As player manager ===
Gresley Rovers

- Southern League Premier Division: 1996–97

Southport

- FA Trophy runner-up: 1997–98
