= Mark Ricketts (footballer) =

English footballer

Personal information
- Full name: Mark James Ricketts
- Date of birth: 7 October 1984 (age 42)
- Place of birth: Sidcup, England
- Positions: Defender; midfielder

Youth career
- 2002–2005: Charlton Athletic

Senior career*
Years	Team	Apps	(Gls)
2005–2006	Charlton Athletic	0	(0)
2005–2006	→ Milton Keynes Dons (loan)	5	(0)
2006–2009	Ebbsfleet United	94	(1)
2009–2016	Woking	240	(3)
2016–2023	Boreham Wood	216	(1)
2023–2024	Dulwich Hamlet	17	(0)
Total		572	(5)
- * Club domestic league appearances and goals as of 14:24, 15 May 2024 (UTC)

Mark James Ricketts (born 7 October 1984) is an English former footballer who played as a defender.

He previously played in the Football League for Milton Keynes Dons and in the National League with Ebbsfleet United, Woking and Boreham Wood featuring over 500 times.

== Career ==
Born in Sidcup, Ricketts began his career at Charlton Athletic in 2000 but made no appearances for the first team. He had a loan spell at League One club Milton Keynes Dons in the 2005–06 season. He made his debut in the FA Cup first-round tie at Lincoln City, and played twice more before suffering a knee ligament injury. Despite the injury, his loan spell was extended for a second and third month, and he made seven league and cup appearances for MK Dons.

At the end of the season, he was released by Charlton after the club decided not to offer him a new contract, and joined Gravesend and Northfleet in August 2006. He made 31 appearances in the 2006–07 season, and his performances were rewarded by the newly renamed Ebbsfleet United with a new contract in May 2007. A knee injury that required surgery interrupted the beginning of Ricketts' 2007–08 season, but he returned to the side at the end of September 2007 and went on to make 30 appearances that season. He was put on standby for the England C squad in February 2008, and collected a winners' medal when Ebbsfleet won the FA Trophy at Wembley Stadium in May 2008. He signed a new contract in June 2008.

In June 2009, Ricketts signed for Conference South club Woking. In 2010, Ricketts was made club captain. Ricketts quickly became a fan favourite at Woking and went on to make over 200 league appearances before leaving in June 2016.

On 10 June 2016, Ricketts joined National League rival Boreham Wood on a free transfer. On 6 August 2016, Ricketts made his Boreham Wood debut in a 1–0 victory over Forest Green Rovers, playing the full 90 minutes. On 6 February 2022, Ricketts scored Boreham Wood's only goal in a 1–0 shock away win against Bournemouth in the FA Cup fourth round.

On 4 June 2023, Ricketts agreed to join Dulwich Hamlet ahead of the 2023–24 campaign following his release from Boreham Wood and ultimately ending his seven-year spell with the side.

In April 2024, Ricketts announced that he would retire following the conclusion of the 2023–24 season.

== Coaching career ==
On 15 May 2024, Ricketts returned to Boreham Wood as assistant manager to the newly appointed Ross Jenkins ahead of their first season back in the National League South. Having helped the club gain immediate promotion back to the National League, he departed the club in June 2025.

== Career statistics ==
As of end of 2023–24 season

Appearances and goals by club, season and competition
Club	Season	League			FA Cup		League Cup		Other		Total	
Club	Season	Division	Apps	Goals	Apps	Goals	Apps	Goals	Apps	Goals	Apps	Goals
Charlton Athletic	2005–06	Premier League	0	0	0	0	0	0	—		0	0
Milton Keynes Dons (loan)	2005–06	League One	5	0	2	0	0	0	0	0	7	0
Gravesend & Northfleet / Ebbsfleet United	2006–07	Conference National	30	0	0	0	—		1 (Note: Appearance(s) in FA Trophy)	0	31	0
Gravesend & Northfleet / Ebbsfleet United	2007–08	Conference Premier	29	0	0	0	—		1	0	30	0
Gravesend & Northfleet / Ebbsfleet United	2008–09	Conference Premier	35	1	1	0	—		3	0	39	1
Gravesend & Northfleet / Ebbsfleet United	Total		94	1	1	0	—		5	0	100	1
Woking	2009–10	Conference South	37	2	5	0	—		6 (Note: Three appearances in FA Trophy, three in Conference South play-offs)	0	48	2
Woking	2010–11	Conference South	38	1	6	0	—		6 (Note: Four appearances in FA Trophy, two in Conference South play-offs)	0	50	1
Woking	2011–12	Conference South	21	0	2	0	—		1	0	24	0
Woking	2012–13	Conference Premier	45	0	1	0	—		2	0	48	0
Woking	2013–14	Conference Premier	41	0	1	0	—		1	0	43	0
Woking	2014–15	Conference Premier	22	0	0	0	—		0	0	22	0
Woking	2015–16	National League	36	0	1	0	—		4	0	41	0
Woking	Total		240	3	16	0	—		20	0	276	3
Boreham Wood	2016–17	National League	38	0	2	0	—		6	0	46	0
Boreham Wood	2017–18	National League	42	1	3	0	—		7 (Note: Four appearances in FA Trophy, three in National League play-offs)	0	52	1
Boreham Wood	2018–19	National League	40	0	3	0	—		2	0	45	0
Boreham Wood	2019–20	National League	32	0	1	0	—		3 (Note: One appearance in FA Trophy, two in National League play-offs)	0	36	0
Boreham Wood	2020–21	National League	26	0	2	1	—		1	0	29	1
Boreham Wood	2021–22	National League	26	0	6	1	—		2	0	34	1
Boreham Wood	2022–23	National League	12	0	2	0	—		2 (Note: Appearances in National League play-offs)	0	16	0
Boreham Wood	Total		216	1	19	2	—		23	0	258	3
Dulwich Hamlet	2023–24	Isthmian League Premier Division	17	0	2	0	—		2 (Note: One appearance in FA Trophy, one appearance in Alan Turvey Trophy)	0	21	0
Career total			572	5	40	2	0	0	50	0	662	7

== Honours ==
Ebbsfleet United

- FA Trophy: 2007–08

Woking

- Conference South: 2011–12
