= Premier League Player of the Month =

English football award

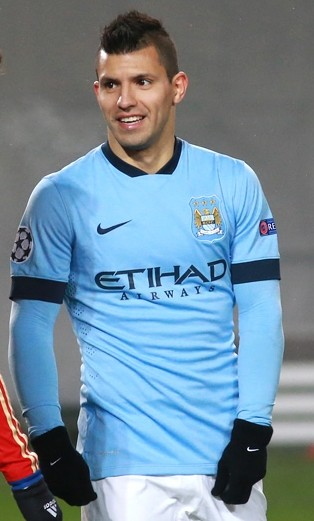
Sergio Agüero has won the award a joint-record seven times.

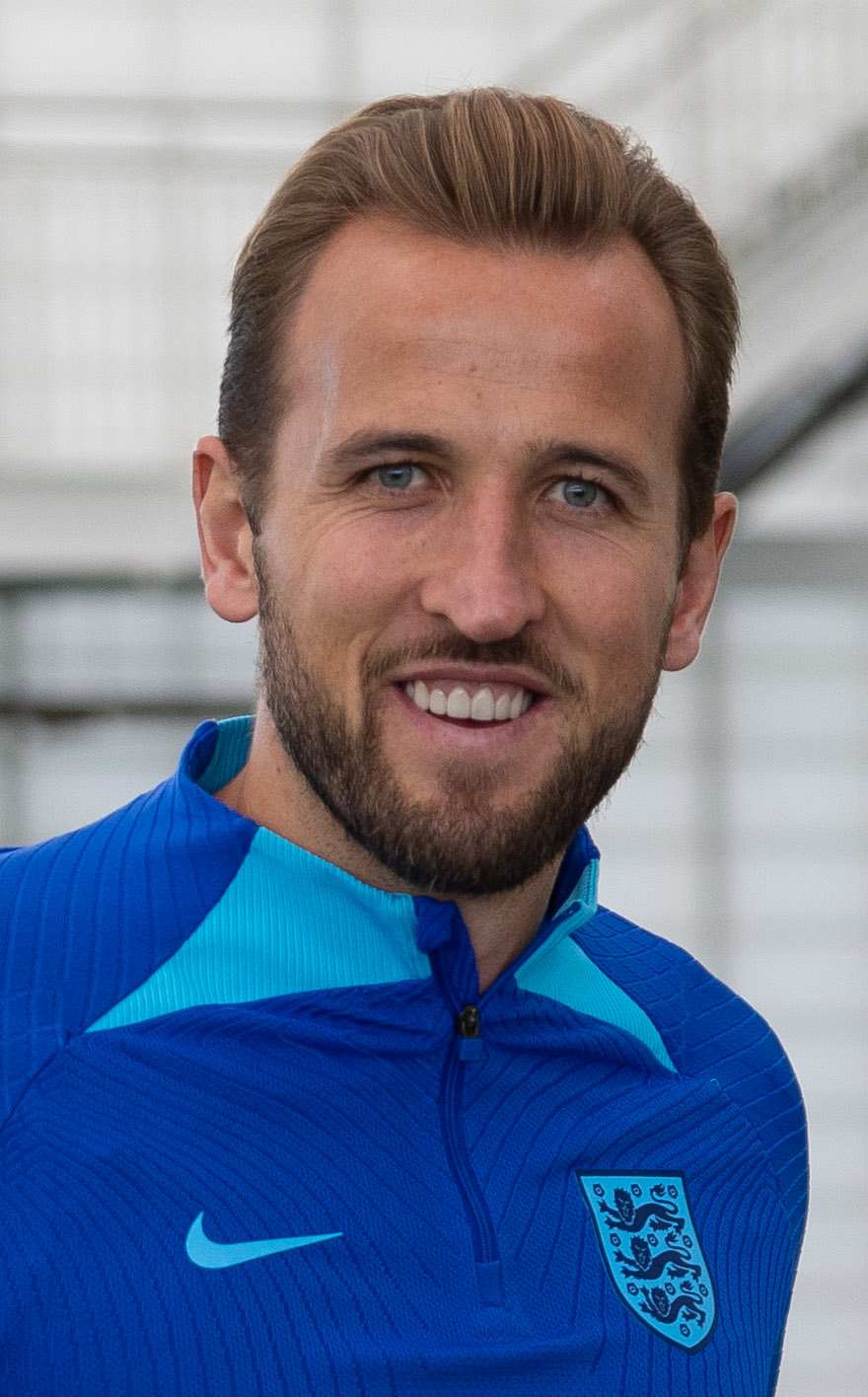
Harry Kane has won the award a joint-record seven times.

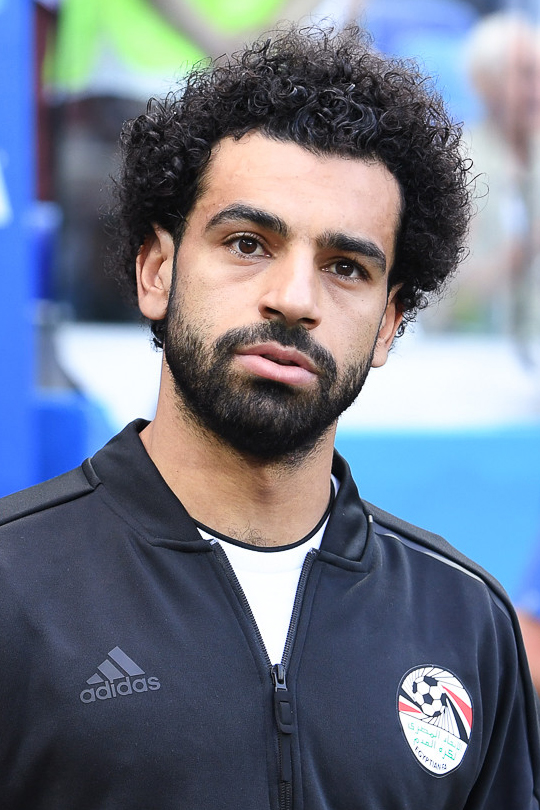
Mohamed Salah has won the award a joint-record seven times.

The Premier League Player of the Month is an association football award that recognises the best adjudged Premier League player each month of the season. The winner is chosen by a combination of an online public vote, which contributes to 10% of the final tally, a panel of experts, and the captain of each Premier League club. It has been called the Carling Premiership Player of the Month (1994–2001), the Barclaycard Premiership Player of the Month (2001–2004) and the Barclays Player of the Month (2004–2016); it is currently known as the EA Sports Player of the Month.

The Premier League was formed in 1992, when the members of the First Division resigned from the Football League. These clubs set up a new commercially independent league that negotiated its own broadcast and sponsorship agreements. The Premier League introduced new Manager of the Month and Manager of the Season awards for the 1993–94 season, supplementing the existing Football Writers' Association and Professional Footballers' Association Player of the Year awards. For the 1994–95 season, the Premier League introduced the Player of the Month award, which is presented alongside the Manager of the Month award. The first Player of the Month was awarded to Tottenham Hotspur player Jürgen Klinsmann for his performances in August 1994.

Sergio Agüero, Harry Kane, and Mohamed Salah have been Player of the Month the most with seven awards each. Nine players have won the award in consecutive months: Robbie Fowler, Dennis Bergkamp, Cristiano Ronaldo, Harry Kane, Jamie Vardy, Mohamed Salah, Bruno Fernandes, İlkay Gündoğan, and Marcus Rashford. Only Mohamed Salah and Marcus Rashford have won the award three times in a single season. Fernandes is the first player to win four awards in one calendar year. Nineteen individuals have won two awards in a season: Robbie Fowler, Dennis Bergkamp, Ruud van Nistelrooy, Thierry Henry, Wayne Rooney, Ryan Giggs, Cristiano Ronaldo, Ashley Young, Peter Odemwingie, Robin van Persie, Daniel Sturridge, Luis Suárez, Harry Kane, Jamie Vardy, Sergio Agüero, Son Heung-min, Bruno Fernandes, Erling Haaland, and Mohamed Salah. Robbie Keane has won the award while playing for three clubs, while twelve players have won the award playing for two clubs: Alan Shearer, Dion Dublin, David Ginola, Dwight Yorke, Tim Flowers, Teddy Sheringham, Danny Murphy, Andrew Johnson, Nicolas Anelka, Dimitar Berbatov, Scott Parker and Robin van Persie.

The award has been shared on six occasions: by Blackburn Rovers's Alan Shearer and Chris Sutton in November 1994, Liverpool's Robbie Fowler and Stan Collymore in January 1996, Southampton's Kevin Davies and Manchester United's Andy Cole in November 1997, Arsenal's Dennis Bergkamp and Edu in February 2004, Tottenham Hotspur's Dimitar Berbatov and Robbie Keane in April 2007 and Liverpool's Steven Gerrard and Luis Suárez in April 2014. More than four in ten of the Player of the Month awards have gone to English players, and about a fifth of foreign winners have been French or Dutch. Manchester United have had more Player of the Month awards than any other club.

As of October 2026, the latest winner is Aston Villa forward Nicolas Jackson.

== List of winners ==
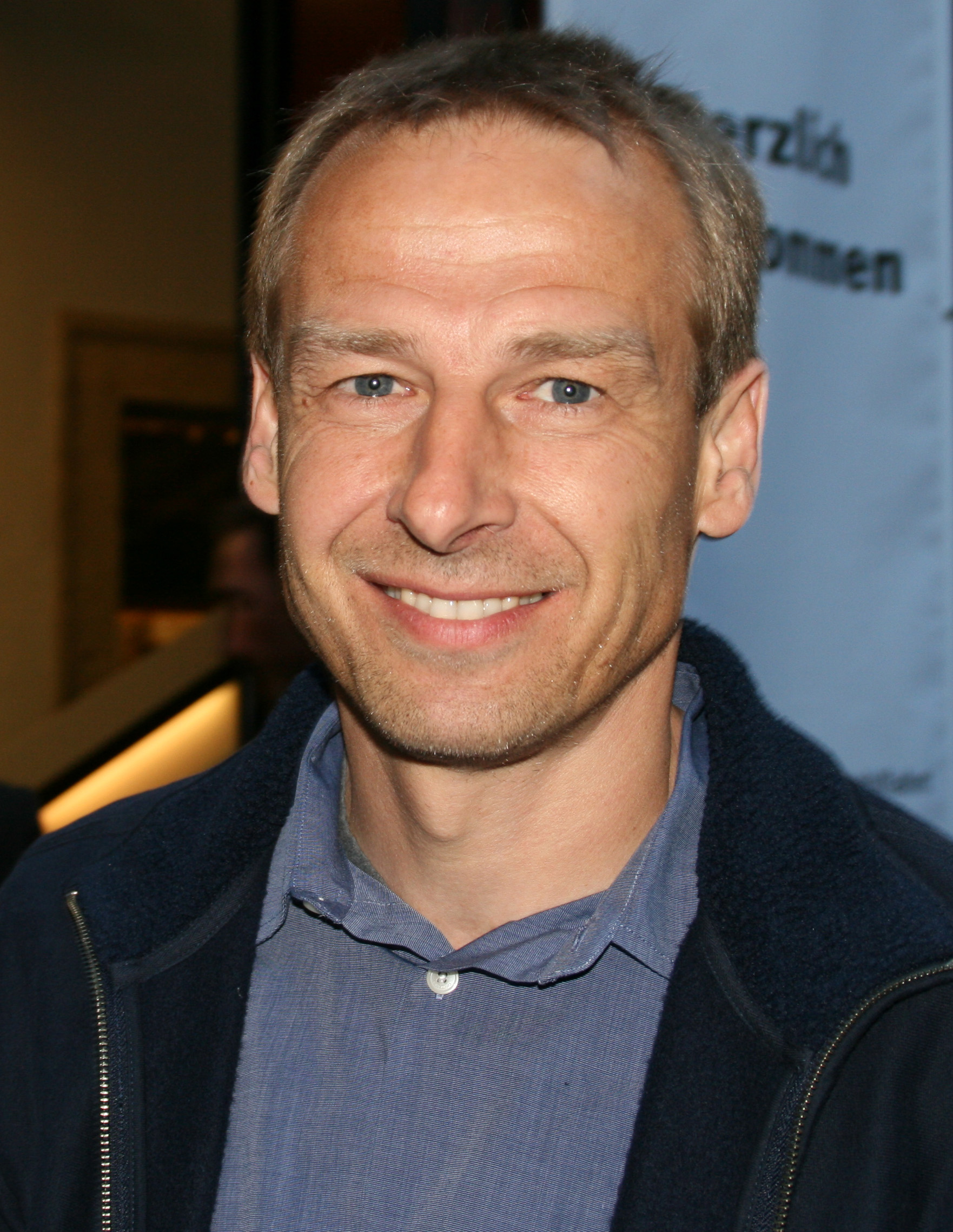
Jürgen Klinsmann won the first Player of the Month award in August 1994.

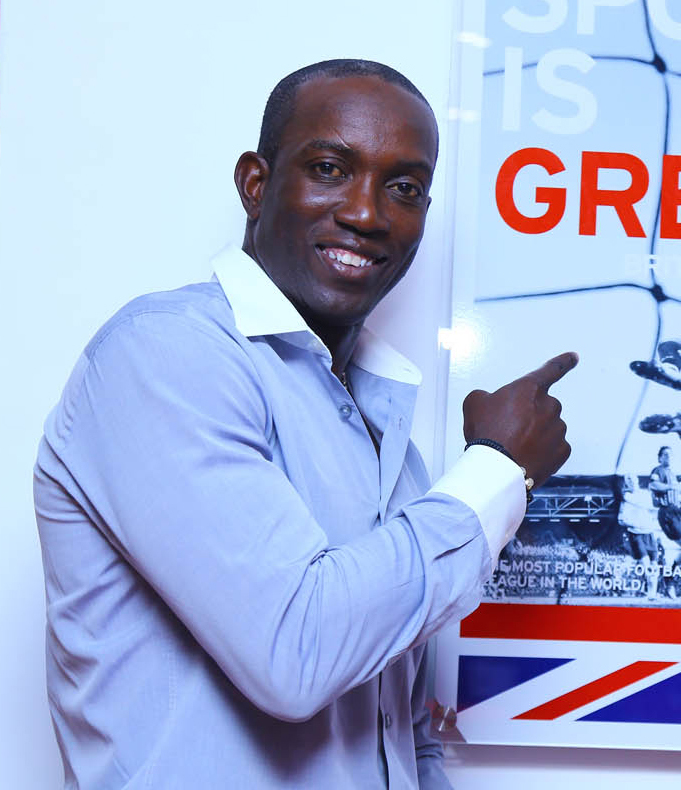
Dwight Yorke is the first player from the Americas to win the award.

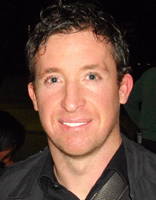
Robbie Fowler is the first player to win the award in consecutive months.

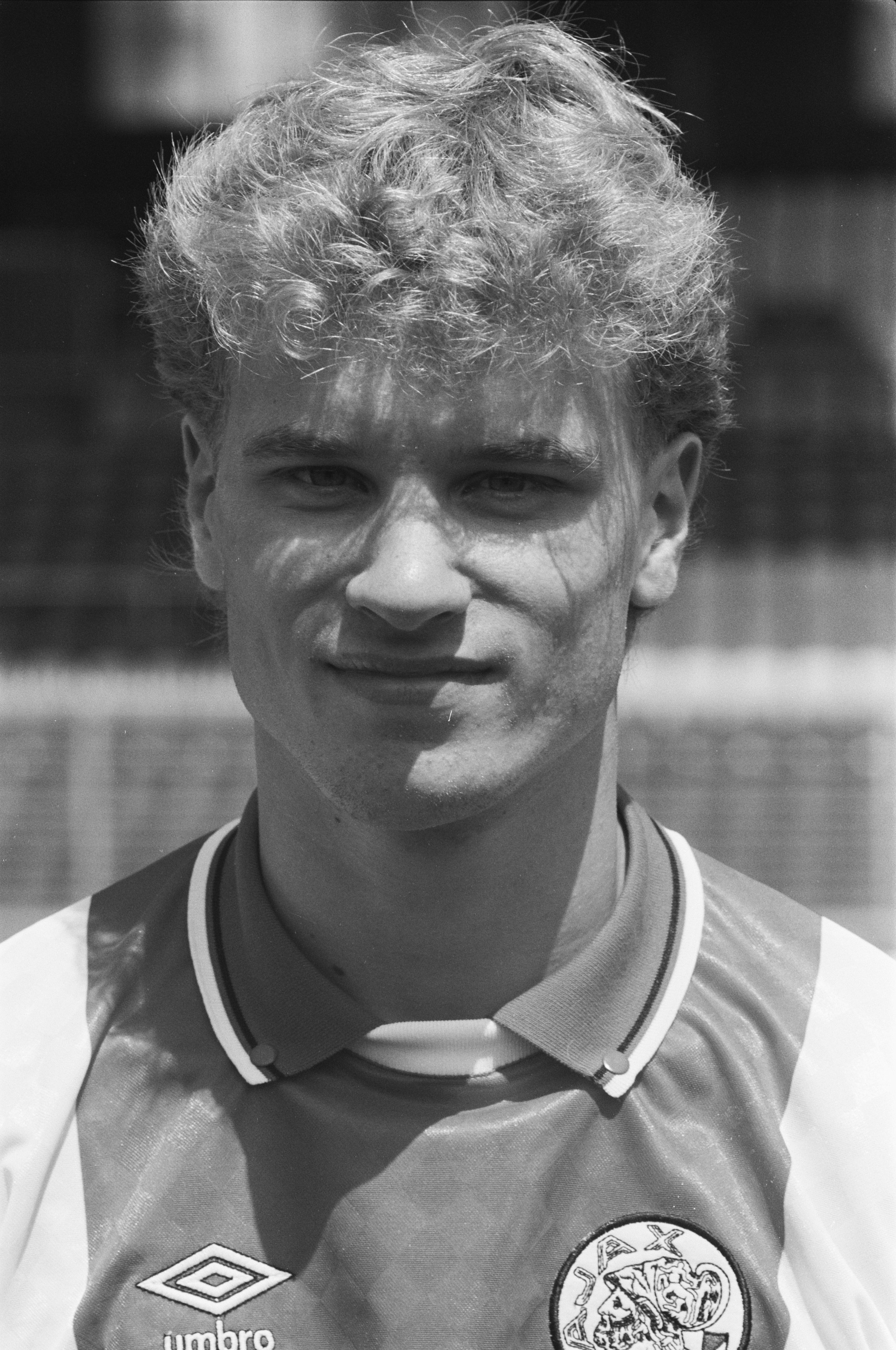
Dennis Bergkamp is the first player to win the award outright in consecutive months.

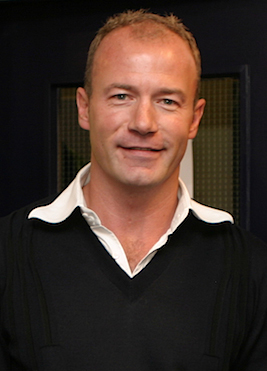
Alan Shearer is the first player to win the award with different clubs.

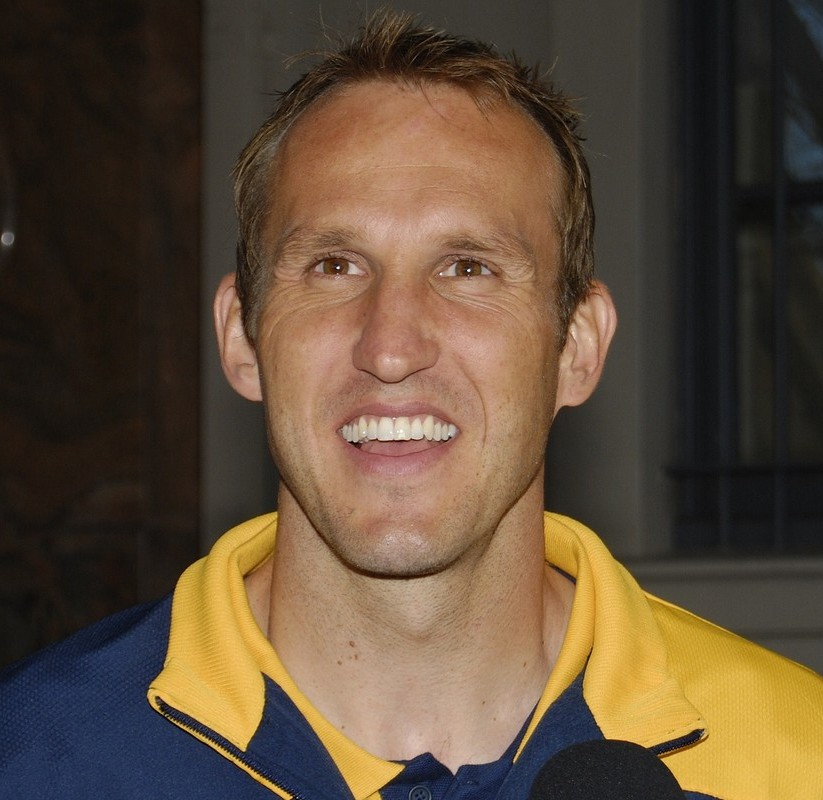
Mark Schwarzer is the first player from Oceania to win the award.

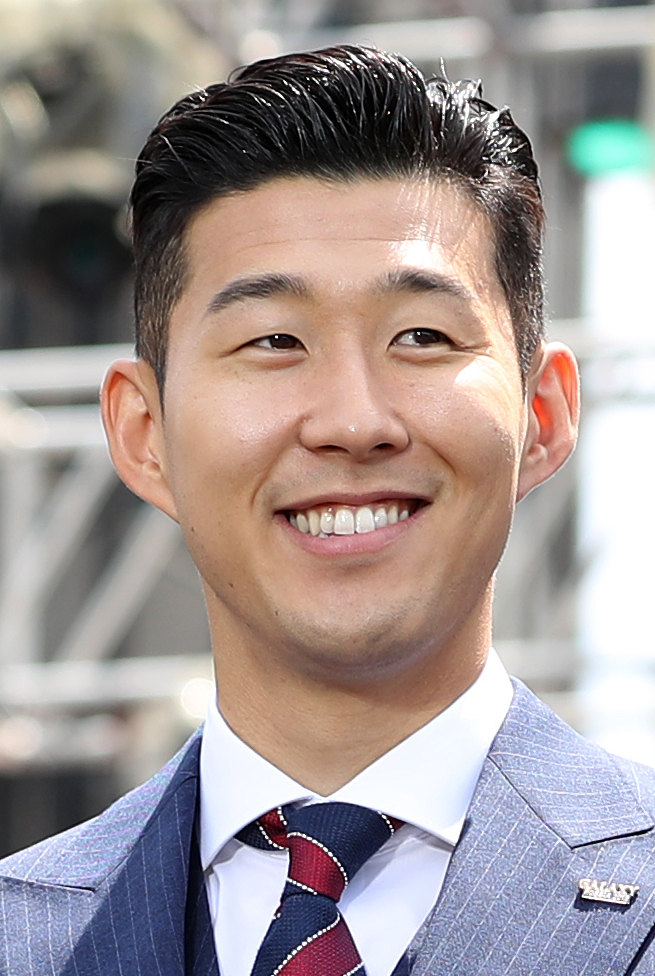
Son Heung-min is the first player from Asia to win the award.

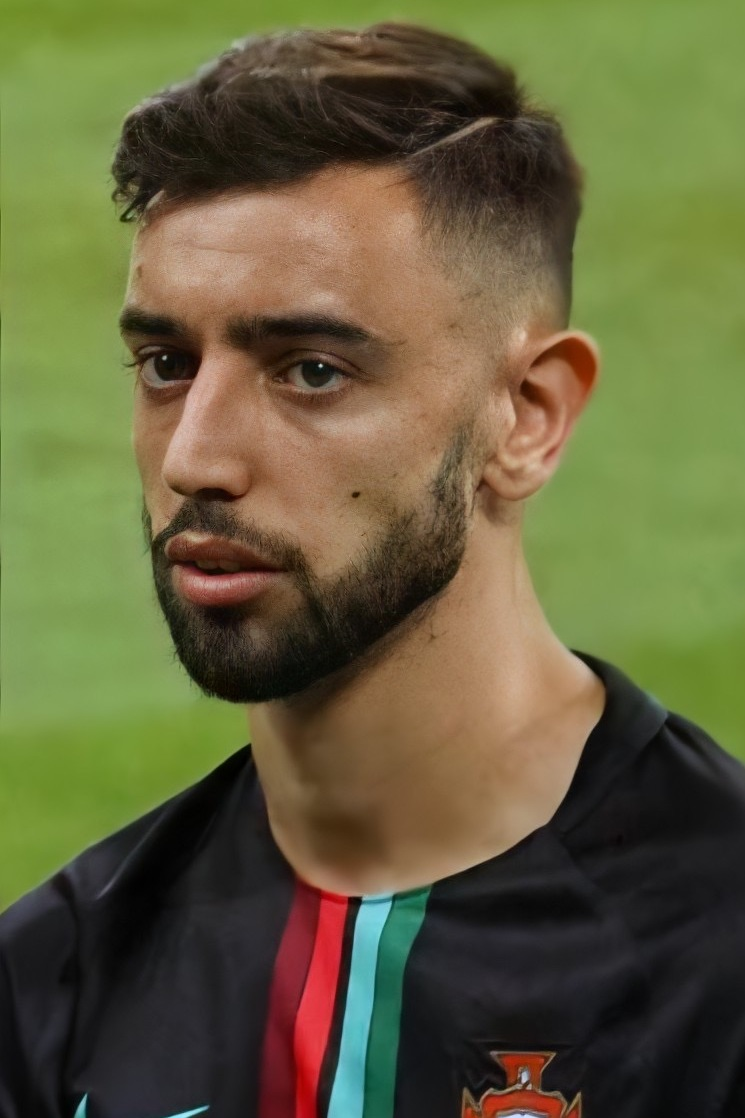
Bruno Fernandes became the first player to win four Player of the Month awards in a single year.

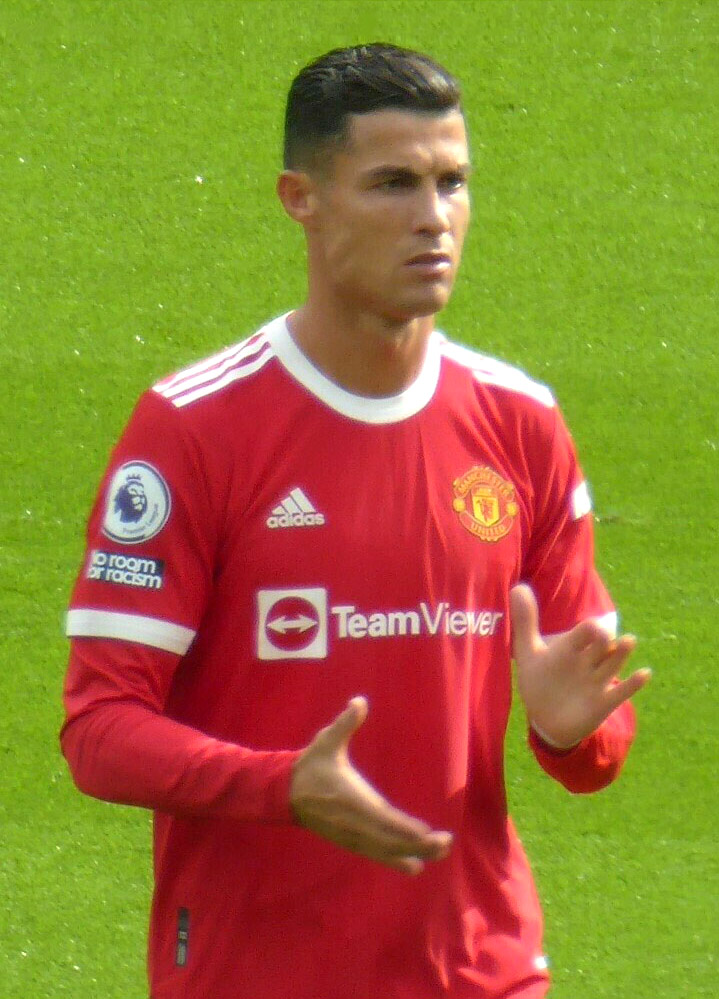
Cristiano Ronaldo received six Player of the Month awards, and with the longest gap between awards (March 2008 and September 2021).

=== Key ===
- Players marked † shared the award with another player.
- Position key: GK – Goalkeeper; DF – Defender; MF – Midfielder; FW – Forward.

Month	Year (Note: Each year in the table is linked to the article about the corresponding football season.)	Player	Nationality	Pos.	Club	Ref.
August	1994	Jürgen Klinsmann	Germany	FW	Tottenham Hotspur	
September	1994	Rob Lee	England	MF	Newcastle United	
October	1994	Paul Ince	England	MF	Manchester United	
November	1994	Alan Shearer †	England	FW	Blackburn Rovers	
November	1994	Chris Sutton †	England	FW	Blackburn Rovers	
December	1994	Matt Le Tissier	England	MF	Southampton	
January	1995	Chris Waddle	England	MF	Sheffield Wednesday	
February	1995	Duncan Ferguson	Scotland	FW	Everton	
March	1995	Tony Yeboah	Ghana	FW	Leeds United	
April	1995	David Seaman	England	GK	Arsenal	
August	1995	David Ginola	France	FW	Newcastle United	
September	1995	Tony Yeboah	Ghana	FW	Leeds United	
October	1995	Trevor Sinclair	England	MF	Queens Park Rangers	
November	1995	Rob Lee	England	MF	Newcastle United	
December	1995	Robbie Fowler	England	FW	Liverpool	
January	1996	Stan Collymore †	England	FW	Liverpool	
January	1996	Robbie Fowler †	England	FW	Liverpool	
February	1996	Dwight Yorke	Trinidad and Tobago	MF	Aston Villa	
March	1996	Eric Cantona	France	FW	Manchester United	
April	1996	Andrei Kanchelskis	Russia	FW	Everton	
August	1996	David Beckham	England	MF	Manchester United	
September	1996	Patrik Berger	Czech Republic	MF	Liverpool	
October	1996	Matt Le Tissier	England	MF	Southampton	
November	1996	Ian Wright	England	FW	Arsenal	
December	1996	Gianfranco Zola	Italy	FW	Chelsea	
January	1997	Tim Flowers	England	GK	Blackburn Rovers	
February	1997	Robbie Earle	Jamaica	MF	Wimbledon	
March	1997	Juninho Paulista	Brazil	MF	Middlesbrough	
April	1997	Mickey Evans	Ireland	FW	Southampton	
August	1997	Dennis Bergkamp	Netherlands	FW	Arsenal	
September	1997	Dennis Bergkamp	Netherlands	FW	Arsenal	
October	1997	Paulo Wanchope	Costa Rica	FW	Derby County	
November	1997	Andy Cole †	England	FW	Manchester United	
November	1997	Kevin Davies †	England	FW	Southampton	
December	1997	Steve McManaman	England	MF	Liverpool	
January	1998	Dion Dublin	England	FW	Coventry City	
February	1998	Chris Sutton	England	FW	Blackburn Rovers	
March	1998	Alex Manninger	Austria	GK	Arsenal	
April	1998	Emmanuel Petit	France	MF	Arsenal	
August	1998	Michael Owen	England	FW	Liverpool	
September	1998	Alan Shearer	England	FW	Newcastle United	
October	1998	Roy Keane	Ireland	MF	Manchester United	
November	1998	Dion Dublin	England	FW	Aston Villa	
December	1998	David Ginola	France	FW	Tottenham Hotspur	
January	1999	Dwight Yorke	Trinidad and Tobago	MF	Manchester United	
February	1999	Nicolas Anelka	France	FW	Arsenal	
March	1999	Ray Parlour	England	MF	Arsenal	
April	1999	Kevin Campbell	England	FW	Everton	
August	1999	Robbie Keane	Ireland	FW	Coventry City	
September	1999	Muzzy Izzet	Turkey	MF	Leicester City	
October	1999	Kevin Phillips	England	FW	Sunderland	
November	1999	Sami Hyypiä	Finland	DF	Liverpool	
December	1999	Roy Keane	Ireland	MF	Manchester United	
January	2000	Gareth Southgate	England	DF	Aston Villa	
February	2000	Paul Merson	England	MF	Aston Villa	
March	2000	Dwight Yorke	Trinidad and Tobago	MF	Manchester United	
April	2000	Thierry Henry	France	FW	Arsenal	
August	2000	Alan Smith	England	MF	Leeds United	
September	2000	Tim Flowers	England	GK	Leicester City	
October	2000	Teddy Sheringham	England	FW	Manchester United	
November	2000	Paul Robinson	England	GK	Leeds United	
December	2000	James Beattie	England	FW	Southampton	
January	2001	Robbie Keane	Ireland	FW	Leeds United	
February	2001	Stuart Pearce	England	DF	West Ham United	
March	2001	Steven Gerrard	England	MF	Liverpool	
April	2001	Gary McAllister	Scotland	MF	Liverpool	
August	2001	Louis Saha	France	FW	Fulham	
September	2001	Juan Sebastián Verón	Argentina	MF	Manchester United	
October	2001	Rio Ferdinand	England	DF	Leeds United	
November	2001	Danny Murphy	England	MF	Liverpool	
December	2001	Ruud van Nistelrooy	Netherlands	FW	Manchester United	
January	2002	Marcus Bent	England	FW	Ipswich Town	
February	2002	Ruud van Nistelrooy	Netherlands	FW	Manchester United	
March	2002	Dennis Bergkamp	Netherlands	FW	Arsenal	
April	2002	Freddie Ljungberg	Sweden	MF	Arsenal	
August	2002	Sylvain Wiltord	France	FW	Arsenal	
September	2002	Thierry Henry	France	FW	Arsenal	
October	2002	Gianfranco Zola	Italy	FW	Chelsea	
November	2002	James Beattie	England	FW	Southampton	
December	2002	Alan Shearer	England	FW	Newcastle United	
January	2003	Paul Scholes	England	MF	Manchester United	
February	2003	Robert Pires	France	MF	Arsenal	
March	2003	Steven Gerrard	England	MF	Liverpool	
April	2003	Ruud van Nistelrooy	Netherlands	FW	Manchester United	
August	2003	Teddy Sheringham	England	FW	Portsmouth	
September	2003	Frank Lampard	England	MF	Chelsea	
October	2003	Alan Shearer	England	FW	Newcastle United	
November	2003	Jay-Jay Okocha	Nigeria	MF	Bolton Wanderers	
December	2003	Paul Scholes	England	MF	Manchester United	
January	2004	Thierry Henry	France	FW	Arsenal	
February	2004	Dennis Bergkamp †	Netherlands	FW	Arsenal	
February	2004	Edu †	Brazil	MF	Arsenal	
March	2004	Mikael Forssell	Finland	FW	Birmingham City	
April	2004	Thierry Henry	France	FW	Arsenal	
August	2004	José Antonio Reyes	Spain	MF	Arsenal	
September	2004	Ledley King	England	DF	Tottenham Hotspur	
October	2004	Andrew Johnson	England	FW	Crystal Palace	
November	2004	Arjen Robben	Netherlands	MF	Chelsea	
December	2004	Steven Gerrard	England	MF	Liverpool	
January	2005	John Terry	England	DF	Chelsea	
February	2005	Wayne Rooney	England	FW	Manchester United	
March	2005	Joe Cole	England	MF	Chelsea	
April	2005	Frank Lampard	England	MF	Chelsea	
August	2005	Darren Bent	England	FW	Charlton Athletic	
September	2005	Danny Murphy	England	MF	Charlton Athletic	
October	2005	Frank Lampard	England	MF	Chelsea	
November	2005	Robin van Persie	Netherlands	FW	Arsenal	
December	2005	Wayne Rooney	England	FW	Manchester United	
January	2006	Anton Ferdinand	England	DF	West Ham United	
February	2006	Kevin Nolan	England	MF	Bolton Wanderers	
March	2006	Wayne Rooney	England	FW	Manchester United	
April	2006	Steven Gerrard	England	MF	Liverpool	
August	2006	Ryan Giggs	Wales	MF	Manchester United	
September	2006	Andrew Johnson	England	FW	Everton	
October	2006	Paul Scholes	England	MF	Manchester United	
November	2006	Cristiano Ronaldo	Portugal	FW	Manchester United	
December	2006	Cristiano Ronaldo	Portugal	FW	Manchester United	
January	2007	Cesc Fàbregas	Spain	MF	Arsenal	
February	2007	Ryan Giggs	Wales	MF	Manchester United	
March	2007	Petr Čech	Czech Republic	GK	Chelsea	
April	2007	Dimitar Berbatov †	Bulgaria	FW	Tottenham Hotspur	
April	2007	Robbie Keane †	Ireland	FW	Tottenham Hotspur	
August	2007	Micah Richards	England	DF	Manchester City	
September	2007	Cesc Fàbregas	Spain	MF	Arsenal	
October	2007	Wayne Rooney	England	FW	Manchester United	
November	2007	Gabriel Agbonlahor	England	FW	Aston Villa	
December	2007	Roque Santa Cruz	Paraguay	FW	Blackburn Rovers	
January	2008	Cristiano Ronaldo	Portugal	FW	Manchester United	
February	2008	Fernando Torres	Spain	FW	Liverpool	
March	2008	Cristiano Ronaldo	Portugal	FW	Manchester United	
April	2008	Ashley Young	England	DF	Aston Villa	
August	2008	Deco	Portugal	MF	Chelsea	
September	2008	Ashley Young	England	DF	Aston Villa	
October	2008	Frank Lampard	England	MF	Chelsea	
November	2008	Nicolas Anelka	France	FW	Chelsea	
December	2008	Ashley Young	England	DF	Aston Villa	
January	2009	Nemanja Vidić	Serbia	DF	Manchester United	
February	2009	Phil Jagielka	England	DF	Everton	
March	2009	Steven Gerrard	England	MF	Liverpool	
April	2009	Andrey Arshavin	Russia	MF	Arsenal	
August	2009	Jermain Defoe	England	FW	Tottenham Hotspur	
September	2009	Fernando Torres	Spain	FW	Liverpool	
October	2009	Robin van Persie	Netherlands	FW	Arsenal	
November	2009	Jimmy Bullard	England	MF	Hull City	
December	2009	Carlos Tevez	Argentina	FW	Manchester City	
January	2010	Wayne Rooney	England	FW	Manchester United	
February	2010	Mark Schwarzer	Australia	GK	Fulham	
March	2010	Florent Malouda	France	MF	Chelsea	
April	2010	Gareth Bale	Wales	FW	Tottenham Hotspur	
August	2010	Paul Scholes	England	MF	Manchester United	
September	2010	Peter Odemwingie	Nigeria	FW	West Bromwich Albion	
October	2010	Rafael van der Vaart	Netherlands	MF	Tottenham Hotspur	
November	2010	Johan Elmander	Sweden	FW	Bolton Wanderers	
December	2010	Samir Nasri	France	MF	Arsenal	
January	2011	Dimitar Berbatov	Bulgaria	FW	Manchester United	
February	2011	Scott Parker	England	MF	West Ham United	
March	2011	David Luiz	Brazil	DF	Chelsea	
April	2011	Peter Odemwingie	Nigeria	FW	West Bromwich Albion	
August	2011	Edin Džeko	Bosnia and Herzegovina	FW	Manchester City	
September	2011	David Silva	Spain	MF	Manchester City	
October	2011	Robin van Persie	Netherlands	FW	Arsenal	
November	2011	Scott Parker	England	MF	Tottenham Hotspur	
December	2011	Demba Ba	Senegal	FW	Newcastle United	
January	2012	Gareth Bale	Wales	FW	Tottenham Hotspur	
February	2012	Peter Odemwingie	Nigeria	FW	West Bromwich Albion	
March	2012	Gylfi Sigurðsson	Iceland	MF	Swansea City	
April	2012	Nikica Jelavić	Croatia	FW	Everton	
September	2012	Steven Fletcher	Scotland	FW	Sunderland	
October	2012	Juan Mata	Spain	MF	Chelsea	
November	2012	Marouane Fellaini	Belgium	MF	Everton	
December	2012	Robin van Persie	Netherlands	FW	Manchester United	
January	2013	Adam Le Fondre	England	FW	Reading	
February	2013	Gareth Bale	Wales	FW	Tottenham Hotspur	
March	2013	Jan Vertonghen	Belgium	DF	Tottenham Hotspur	
April	2013	Robin van Persie	Netherlands	FW	Manchester United	
August	2013	Daniel Sturridge	England	FW	Liverpool	
September	2013	Aaron Ramsey	Wales	MF	Arsenal	
October	2013	Sergio Agüero	Argentina	FW	Manchester City	
November	2013	Tim Krul	Netherlands	GK	Newcastle United	
December	2013	Luis Suárez	Uruguay	FW	Liverpool	
January	2014	Adam Johnson	England	MF	Sunderland	
February	2014	Daniel Sturridge	England	FW	Liverpool	
March	2014	Steven Gerrard †	England	MF	Liverpool	
March	2014	Luis Suárez †	Uruguay	FW	Liverpool	
April	2014	Connor Wickham	England	FW	Sunderland	
August	2014	Diego Costa	Spain	FW	Chelsea	
September	2014	Graziano Pellè	Italy	FW	Southampton	
October	2014	Diafra Sakho	Senegal	FW	West Ham United	
November	2014	Sergio Agüero	Argentina	FW	Manchester City	
December	2014	Charlie Austin	England	FW	Queens Park Rangers	
January	2015	Harry Kane	England	FW	Tottenham Hotspur	
February	2015	Harry Kane	England	FW	Tottenham Hotspur	
March	2015	Olivier Giroud	France	FW	Arsenal	
April	2015	Christian Benteke	Belgium	FW	Aston Villa	
August	2015	André Ayew	Ghana	FW	Swansea City	
September	2015	Anthony Martial	France	FW	Manchester United	
October	2015	Jamie Vardy	England	FW	Leicester City	
November	2015	Jamie Vardy	England	FW	Leicester City	
December	2015	Odion Ighalo	Nigeria	FW	Watford	
January	2016	Sergio Agüero	Argentina	FW	Manchester City	
February	2016	Fraser Forster	England	GK	Southampton	
March	2016	Harry Kane	England	FW	Tottenham Hotspur	
April	2016	Sergio Agüero	Argentina	FW	Manchester City	
August	2016	Raheem Sterling	England	FW	Manchester City	
September	2016	Son Heung-min	South Korea	FW	Tottenham Hotspur	
October	2016	Eden Hazard	Belgium	FW	Chelsea	
November	2016	Diego Costa	Spain	FW	Chelsea	
December	2016	Zlatan Ibrahimović	Sweden	FW	Manchester United	
January	2017	Dele Alli	England	MF	Tottenham Hotspur	
February	2017	Harry Kane	England	FW	Tottenham Hotspur	
March	2017	Romelu Lukaku	Belgium	FW	Everton	
April	2017	Son Heung-min	South Korea	FW	Tottenham Hotspur	
August	2017	Sadio Mané	Senegal	FW	Liverpool	
September	2017	Harry Kane	England	FW	Tottenham Hotspur	
October	2017	Leroy Sané	Germany	FW	Manchester City	
November	2017	Mohamed Salah	Egypt	FW	Liverpool	
December	2017	Harry Kane	England	FW	Tottenham Hotspur	
January	2018	Sergio Agüero	Argentina	FW	Manchester City	
February	2018	Mohamed Salah	Egypt	FW	Liverpool	
March	2018	Mohamed Salah	Egypt	FW	Liverpool	
April	2018	Wilfried Zaha	Ivory Coast	FW	Crystal Palace	
August	2018	Lucas Moura	Brazil	MF	Tottenham Hotspur	
September	2018	Eden Hazard	Belgium	FW	Chelsea	
October	2018	Pierre-Emerick Aubameyang	Gabon	FW	Arsenal	
November	2018	Raheem Sterling	England	FW	Manchester City	
December	2018	Virgil van Dijk	Netherlands	DF	Liverpool	
January	2019	Marcus Rashford	England	FW	Manchester United	
February	2019	Sergio Agüero	Argentina	FW	Manchester City	
March	2019	Sadio Mané	Senegal	FW	Liverpool	
April	2019	Jamie Vardy	England	FW	Leicester City	
August	2019	Teemu Pukki	Finland	FW	Norwich City	
September	2019	Pierre-Emerick Aubameyang	Gabon	FW	Arsenal	
October	2019	Jamie Vardy	England	FW	Leicester City	
November	2019	Sadio Mané	Senegal	FW	Liverpool	
December	2019	Trent Alexander-Arnold	England	DF	Liverpool	
January	2020	Sergio Agüero	Argentina	FW	Manchester City	
February	2020	Bruno Fernandes	Portugal	MF	Manchester United	
June	2020	Bruno Fernandes	Portugal	MF	Manchester United	
July	2020	Michail Antonio	England (Note: Switched nationality from England to Jamaica in 2021.)	MF	West Ham United	
September	2020	Dominic Calvert-Lewin	England	FW	Everton	
October	2020	Son Heung-min	South Korea	FW	Tottenham Hotspur	
November	2020	Bruno Fernandes	Portugal	MF	Manchester United	
December	2020	Bruno Fernandes	Portugal	MF	Manchester United	
January	2021	İlkay Gündoğan	Germany	MF	Manchester City	
February	2021	İlkay Gündoğan	Germany	MF	Manchester City	
March	2021	Kelechi Iheanacho	Nigeria	FW	Leicester City	
April	2021	Jesse Lingard	England	MF	West Ham United	
May	2021	Joe Willock	England	MF	Newcastle United	
August	2021	Michail Antonio	Jamaica	MF	West Ham United	
September	2021	Cristiano Ronaldo	Portugal	FW	Manchester United	
October	2021	Mohamed Salah	Egypt	FW	Liverpool	
November	2021	Trent Alexander-Arnold	England	DF	Liverpool	
December	2021	Raheem Sterling	England	FW	Manchester City	
January	2022	David de Gea	Spain	GK	Manchester United	
February	2022	Joël Matip	Cameroon	DF	Liverpool	
March	2022	Harry Kane	England	FW	Tottenham Hotspur	
April	2022	Cristiano Ronaldo	Portugal	FW	Manchester United	
August	2022	Erling Haaland	Norway	FW	Manchester City	
September	2022	Marcus Rashford	England	FW	Manchester United	
October	2022	Miguel Almirón	Paraguay	FW	Newcastle United	
November/ December (Note: The Premier League was on hold during the 2022 FIFA World Cup, so November and December were treated as one month.)	2022	Martin Ødegaard	Norway	MF	Arsenal	
January	2023	Marcus Rashford	England	FW	Manchester United	
February	2023	Marcus Rashford	England	FW	Manchester United	
March	2023	Bukayo Saka	England	FW	Arsenal	
April	2023	Erling Haaland	Norway	FW	Manchester City	
August	2023	James Maddison	England	MF	Tottenham Hotspur	
September	2023	Son Heung-min	South Korea	FW	Tottenham Hotspur	
October	2023	Mohamed Salah	Egypt	FW	Liverpool	
November	2023	Harry Maguire	England	DF	Manchester United	
December	2023	Dominic Solanke	England	FW	Bournemouth	
January	2024	Diogo Jota	Portugal	FW	Liverpool	
February	2024	Rasmus Højlund	Denmark	FW	Manchester United	
March	2024	Rodrigo Muniz	Brazil	FW	Fulham	
April	2024	Cole Palmer	England	MF	Chelsea	
August	2024	Erling Haaland	Norway	FW	Manchester City	
September	2024	Cole Palmer	England	MF	Chelsea	
October	2024	Chris Wood	New Zealand	FW	Nottingham Forest	
November	2024	Mohamed Salah	Egypt	FW	Liverpool	
December	2024	Alexander Isak	Sweden	FW	Newcastle United	
January	2025	Justin Kluivert	Netherlands	FW	Bournemouth	
February	2025	Mohamed Salah	Egypt	FW	Liverpool	
March	2025	Bruno Fernandes	Portugal	MF	Manchester United	
April	2025	Alexis Mac Allister	Argentina	MF	Liverpool	
August	2025	Jack Grealish	England	MF	Everton	
September	2025	Erling Haaland	Norway	FW	Manchester City	
October	2025	Bryan Mbeumo	Cameroon	FW	Manchester United	
November	2025	Igor Thiago	Brazil	FW	Brentford	
December	2025	Dominic Calvert-Lewin	England	FW	Leeds United	
January	2026	Igor Thiago	Brazil	FW	Brentford	
February	2026	Antoine Semenyo	Ghana	FW	Manchester City	
March	2026	Bruno Fernandes	Portugal	MF	Manchester United	
April	2026	Morgan Gibbs-White	England	MF	Nottingham Forest	
August	2026	João Pedro	Brazil	FW	Chelsea	
September	2026	Pascal Groß	Germany	MF	Brighton & Hove Albion	
October	2026	Nicolas Jackson	Senegal	FW	Aston Villa	

== Multiple winners ==
The following table lists the number of awards won by players who have won at least two Player of the Month awards.

Players in bold are still active in the Premier League. Players in italics are still active in professional football outside of the Premier League.

As of October 2026 award

Rank	Players	Wins
1st	(Argentina) Sergio Agüero	7
1st	(England) Harry Kane	7
1st	(Egypt) Mohamed Salah	7
4th	(Portugal) **Bruno Fernandes**	6
4th	(England) Steven Gerrard (Note: Gerrard shared his March 2014 award.)	6
4th	(Portugal) Cristiano Ronaldo	6
7th	(England) Wayne Rooney	5
7th	(Netherlands) Robin van Persie	5
9th	(Netherlands) Dennis Bergkamp (Note: Bergkamp shared his February 2004 award.)	4
9th	(Norway) **Erling Haaland**	4
9th	(France) Thierry Henry	4
9th	(England) Frank Lampard	4
9th	(England) Marcus Rashford	4
9th	(South Korea) Son Heung-min	4
9th	(England) Paul Scholes	4
9th	(England) Alan Shearer (Note: Shearer shared his November 1994 award.)	4
9th	(England) Jamie Vardy	4
18th	(Wales) Gareth Bale	3
18th	(Republic of Ireland) Robbie Keane (Note: Keane shared his April 2007 award.)	3
18th	(Senegal) Sadio Mané	3
18th	(Netherlands) Ruud van Nistelrooy	3
18th	(Nigeria) Peter Odemwingie	3
18th	(England) Raheem Sterling	3
18th	(Trinidad and Tobago) Dwight Yorke	3
18th	(England) Ashley Young	3
26th	(England) Trent Alexander-Arnold	2
26th	(France) Nicolas Anelka	2
26th	(Jamaica) Michail Antonio	2
26th	(Gabon) Pierre-Emerick Aubameyang	2
26th	(England) James Beattie	2
26th	(Bulgaria) Dimitar Berbatov (Note: Berbatov shared his April 2007 award.)	2
26th	(England) **Dominic Calvert-Lewin**	2
26th	(Spain) Diego Costa	2
26th	(England) Dion Dublin	2
26th	(Spain) Cesc Fàbregas	2
26th	(England) Tim Flowers	2
26th	(England) Robbie Fowler (Note: Fowler shared his January 1996 award.)	2
26th	(Wales) Ryan Giggs	2
26th	(France) David Ginola	2
26th	(Germany) İlkay Gündoğan	2
26th	(Belgium) Eden Hazard	2
26th	(England) Andrew Johnson	2
26th	(Republic of Ireland) Roy Keane	2
26th	(England) Matt Le Tissier	2
26th	(England) Rob Lee	2
26th	(England) Danny Murphy	2
26th	(England) **Cole Palmer**	2
26th	(England) Scott Parker	2
26th	(England) Teddy Sheringham	2
26th	(England) Daniel Sturridge	2
26th	(Uruguay) Luis Suárez (Note: Suarez shared his March 2014 award.)	2
26th	(England) Chris Sutton (Note: Sutton shared his November 1994 award.)	2
26th	(Brazil) **Igor Thiago**	2
26th	(Spain) Fernando Torres	2
26th	(Ghana) Tony Yeboah	2
26th	(Italy) Gianfranco Zola	2

== Awards won by nationality ==
As of October 2026 award

Nationality	Players	Wins
England	72 (Note: Includes Michail Antonio, who switched allegiance from England to Jamaica in 2021.)	121 (Note: Of the English players' awards, 7 have been shared: Alan Shearer and Chris Sutton in November 1994, Stan Collymore and Robbie Fowler in January 1996, Andy Cole and Kevin Davies in November 1997 and Steven Gerrard in March 2014.)
France	12	17
Netherlands	8	17 (Note: The Netherlands' Dennis Bergkamp shared his February 2004 award.)
Portugal	4	14
Spain	7	10
Argentina	4	10
Brazil	7	8 (Note: Brazil's Edu shared his February 2004 award.)
Egypt	1	7
Belgium	5	6
Nigeria	4	6
Senegal	4	6
Ireland	3	6 (Note: Ireland's Robbie Keane shared his April 2007 award.)
Wales	3	6
Germany	4	5
Norway	2	5
Sweden	4	4
Ghana	3	4
South Korea	1	4
Finland	3	3
Scotland	3	3
Italy	2	3
Trinidad and Tobago	1	3
Cameroon	2	2
Czech Republic	2	2
Jamaica	2	2
Paraguay	2	2
Russia	2	2
Bulgaria	1	2 (Note: Bulgaria's Dimitar Berbatov shared his April 2007 award.)
Gabon	1	2
Uruguay	1	2 (Note: Uruguay's Luis Suárez shared his March 2014 award.)
Australia	1	1
Austria	1	1
Bosnia and Herzegovina	1	1
Costa Rica	1	1
Croatia	1	1
Denmark	1	1
Iceland	1	1
Ivory Coast	1	1
New Zealand	1	1
Serbia	1	1
Turkey	1	1

== Awards won by position ==
As of October 2026 award

Position	Players	Wins
Forward	95	178 (Note: Of the forwards' awards, 10 have been shared.)
Midfielder	59	87 (Note: Of the midfielders' awards, two have been shared.)
Defender	17	20
Goalkeeper	9	10

== Awards won by club ==
As of October 2026 award

Club	Players	Wins
Manchester United	24	50 (Note: Manchester United's Andy Cole shared his November 1997 award.)
Liverpool	19	37 (Note: Two awards for Liverpool were shared by Stan Collymore and Robbie Fowler in January 1996.) (Note: Two awards for Liverpool were shared by Steven Gerrard and Luis Suárez in April 2014.)
Arsenal	22	32 (Note: Two awards for Arsenal were shared by Dennis Bergkamp and Edu in February 2004.)
Tottenham Hotspur	15	26 (Note: Two awards for Tottenham Hotspur were shared by Robbie Keane and Dimitar Berbatov in April 2007.)
Chelsea	15	22
Manchester City	10	22
Newcastle United	8	11
Everton	10	10
Aston Villa	8	10
Southampton	6	8 (Note: Southampton's Kevin Davies shared his November 1997 award.)
Leeds United	6	7
West Ham United	6	7
Leicester City	4	7
Blackburn Rovers	4	5 (Note: Two awards for Blackburn Rovers were shared by Alan Shearer and Chris Sutton in November 1994.)
Sunderland	4	4
Bolton Wanderers	3	3
Fulham	3	3
West Bromwich Albion	1	3
Bournemouth	2	2
Charlton Athletic	2	2
Coventry City	2	2
Crystal Palace	2	2
Nottingham Forest	2	2
Queens Park Rangers	2	2
Swansea City	2	2
Brentford	1	2
Birmingham City	1	1
Brighton & Hove Albion	1	1
Derby County	1	1
Hull City	1	1
Ipswich Town	1	1
Middlesbrough	1	1
Norwich City	1	1
Portsmouth	1	1
Reading	1	1
Sheffield Wednesday	1	1
Watford	1	1
Wimbledon	1	1

== See also ==
- Premier League Player of the Season
- Premier League Manager of the Month
- Premier League Goal of the Month
- Premier League Save of the Month
