= 2005–06 FA Premier League =

Football season in England

FA Premier League
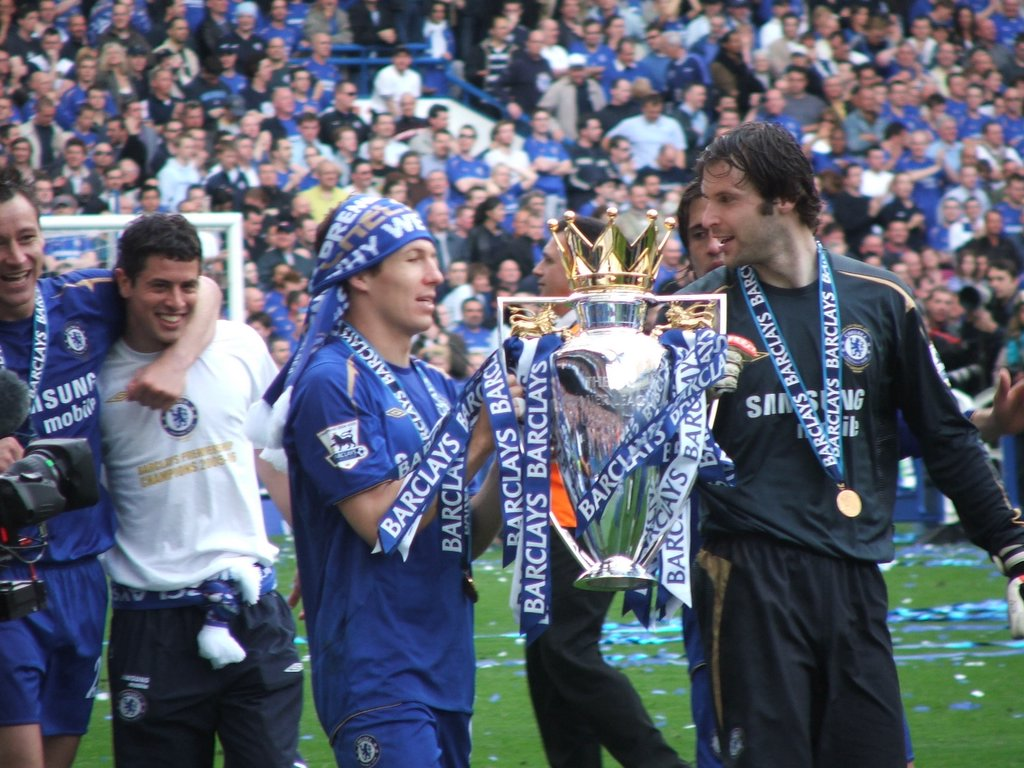
- Season: 2005–06
- Dates: 13 August 2005 – 7 May 2006
- Champions: Chelsea; 2nd Premier League title 3rd English title
- Relegated: Birmingham City; West Bromwich Albion; Sunderland
- Champions League: Chelsea; Manchester United; Liverpool; Arsenal
- UEFA Cup: Tottenham Hotspur; Blackburn Rovers; West Ham United
- Intertoto Cup: Newcastle United
- Matches: 380
- Goals: 944 (2.48 per match)
- Top goalscorer: Thierry Henry (27 goals)
- Best goalkeeper: Pepe Reina (20 clean sheets)
- Biggest home win: Arsenal 7–0 Middlesbrough (14 January 2006)
- Biggest away win: Everton 0–4 Bolton Wanderers (17 December 2005); Middlesbrough 0–4 Aston Villa (4 February 2006); Fulham 0–4 Arsenal (4 March 2006)
- Highest scoring: Charlton Athletic 2–5 Manchester City (4 December 2005); Wigan Athletic 4–3 Manchester City (26 December 2005); Arsenal 7–0 Middlesbrough (14 January 2006); Blackburn Rovers 4–3 Manchester United (1 February 2006); Fulham 6–1 West Bromwich Albion (11 February 2006); Middlesbrough 4–3 Bolton Wanderers (26 March 2006)
- Longest winning run: 10 games Chelsea; Liverpool
- Longest unbeaten run: 13 games Chelsea
- Longest winless run: 14 games Sunderland
- Longest losing run: 9 games Sunderland
- Highest attendance: 73,006; Manchester United 4–0 Charlton Athletic (7 May 2006)
- Lowest attendance: 16,550; Fulham 0–0 Birmingham City (13 August 2005)
- Total attendance: 12,876,213
- Average attendance: 33,885

The 2005–06 FA Premier League (known as the FA Barclays Premiership for sponsorship reasons) was the 14th season of the Premier League. It began on 13 August 2005, and concluded on 7 May 2006. The season saw Chelsea retain their title after defeating Manchester United 3–0 at Stamford Bridge towards the end of April. On the same day, West Bromwich Albion and Birmingham City were relegated, joining Sunderland in the Championship for the following season. Chelsea matched the record number of wins they set the previous season, with 29 wins, albeit with more defeats.

== Season summary ==
Several clubs reported disappointing attendances and/or trouble selling out their grounds for the opening weeks' matches. Many have argued that this was due mainly to the comparatively early season start and the Ashes Test cricket series which caught the nation's imagination and which England went on to win. Other possible reasons are continued escalation of ticket prices and the increasing number of games shown on television (which has had the knock on effect of greater variation in kick-off times). The overall decline in attendances for the season was only around 2%, but that figure is reduced by the fact that bigger clubs were promoted into the Premiership than were relegated and several clubs have suffered larger falls.

For the second time in two seasons, José Mourinho's Chelsea triumphed in the Premier League, with a home win over closest rivals Manchester United confirming them as champions after a record setting albeit tense season.

Chelsea's early season form with 14 wins out of 16 gave the champions an unequivocal head start. With Manchester United, Arsenal and Liverpool falling way short of their expectations before Christmas, Chelsea had effectively become champions-elect by early 2006. However, a sudden collapse in form by mid-March caused their seemingly unassailable lead of 16 points to be cut to just 7 in two months due to the impressive late run of form of Manchester United, who went on a nine-match winning streak scoring over 20 goals. However, a shock home draw with bottom of the table Sunderland at Old Trafford killed United's title hopes. The momentum was back with Chelsea who didn't need a second bite at the apple with wins over Bolton, Everton and finally Manchester United giving the west Londoners their second successive championship under Mourinho.

The top two clubs at the end of the season earned the right to participate in the UEFA Champions League group stages, while the third- and fourth-placed clubs get places in the Champions League Third Qualifying Round (where they progress to the Champions League group stages if they win or the UEFA Cup if they lose). However, if an English team wins the Champions League, but finishes outside the top four, then they get the final Champions League spot instead of the fourth-placed club, who have to settle for a place in the UEFA Cup. This could have been the case with Arsenal and Tottenham Hotspur, but Arsenal pipped Spurs to fourth place in the final matchday of the season before losing 2–1 to FC Barcelona in the final of the UEFA Champions League.

The fifth-placed club always earns a spot in the UEFA Cup. The winners of the FA Cup also earn a place in the UEFA Cup. If they have already qualified for European competition by their league position or winning the League Cup, then the FA Cup runners-up get their place. If the runners-up, too, have already qualified, then the highest league finisher who have not already qualified for Europe (normally sixth place) are given the place. This season, the FA Cup final featured Liverpool and West Ham. Since Liverpool finished third they were assured of a spot in the Champions League qualifying round, which in turn meant that West Ham received the cup winner's UEFA Cup place.

The League Cup winners also qualify for the UEFA Cup. If they have already qualified for European competition through other means then their place is, unlike the FA Cup, not awarded to the runner-up, but instead the highest league finisher who has not qualified for Europe. League Cup winners Manchester United finished second, placing them directly into the Champions League group stage. This meant that the sixth-placed club, Blackburn Rovers, qualified for the UEFA Cup. The team directly after the UEFA Cup places, goes into the UEFA Intertoto Cup which means in turn, if the team – Newcastle United this season – wins a 2-legged match means they earn a place in the qualifying round of the UEFA Cup.

2005-06 also saw the final action of two of the most successful players in English football, Alan Shearer (last played for Newcastle United) and Dennis Bergkamp (last played for Arsenal).

== Teams ==
Twenty teams competed in the league – the top seventeen teams from the previous season and the three teams promoted from the Championship. The promoted teams were Sunderland, Wigan Athletic and West Ham United. Sunderland and West Ham United returned to the top flight after absences of two years, while Wigan Athletic played in the top flight for the first time in history. They replaced Crystal Palace, Norwich City (both teams relegated to the Championship after a season's presence) and Southampton (ending their top flight spell of twenty-seven years).

=== Stadiums and locations ===
Locations of the 2005–06 Premier League teams
Greater London Premier League football clubs
Greater Manchester Premier League football clubs
West Midlands Premier League football clubs

Team	Location	Stadium	Capacity
Arsenal	London (Highbury)	Arsenal Stadium (Note: This was Arsenal's last season at their long-time home of the Arsenal Stadium. The Gunners opened the 60,000-seat Emirates Stadium in the summer of 2006.)	38,419
Aston Villa	Birmingham (Aston)	Villa Park	42,553
Birmingham City	Birmingham (Bordesley)	St Andrew's	30,079
Blackburn Rovers	Blackburn	Ewood Park	31,367
Bolton Wanderers	Bolton	Reebok Stadium	28,723
Charlton Athletic	London (Charlton)	The Valley	27,111
Chelsea	London (Fulham)	Stamford Bridge	42,360
Everton	Liverpool (Walton)	Goodison Park	40,569
Fulham	London (Fulham)	Craven Cottage	24,600
Liverpool	Liverpool (Anfield)	Anfield	45,276
Manchester City	Manchester (Bradford)	City of Manchester Stadium	48,000
Manchester United	Manchester (Old Trafford)	Old Trafford	68,217
Middlesbrough	Middlesbrough	Riverside Stadium	35,049
Newcastle United	Newcastle upon Tyne	St James' Park	52,387
Portsmouth	Portsmouth	Fratton Park	20,220
Sunderland	Sunderland	Stadium of Light	49,000
Tottenham Hotspur	London (Tottenham)	White Hart Lane	36,240
West Bromwich Albion	West Bromwich	The Hawthorns	26,484
West Ham United	London (Upton Park)	Boleyn Ground	35,146
Wigan Athletic	Wigan	JJB Stadium	25,138

=== Personnel and kits ===
Team	Manager	Captain	Kit manufacturer	Shirt sponsor
Arsenal	(France) Arsène Wenger	(France) Thierry Henry	Nike	O_{2}
Aston Villa	(Republic of Ireland) David O'Leary	(Sweden) Olof Mellberg	Hummel	DWS Investments
Birmingham City	(England) Steve Bruce	(Republic of Ireland) Kenny Cunningham	Lonsdale	Flybe
Blackburn Rovers	(Wales) Mark Hughes	(New Zealand) Ryan Nelsen	Lonsdale	Lonsdale
Bolton Wanderers	(England) Sam Allardyce	(England) Kevin Nolan	Reebok	Reebok
Charlton Athletic	(England) Alan Curbishley	(Republic of Ireland) Matt Holland	Joma	Llanera^{1}
Chelsea	(Portugal) José Mourinho	(England) John Terry	Umbro	Samsung Mobile
Everton	(Scotland) David Moyes	(Scotland) David Weir	Umbro	Chang
Fulham	(Wales) Chris Coleman	(Portugal) Luís Boa Morte	Puma	Pipex
Liverpool	(Spain) Rafael Benítez	(England) Steven Gerrard	Reebok	Carlsberg
Manchester City	(England) Stuart Pearce	(France) Sylvain Distin	Reebok	Thomas Cook
Manchester United	(Scotland) Sir Alex Ferguson	(England) Gary Neville	Nike	Vodafone
Middlesbrough	(England) Steve McClaren	(England) Gareth Southgate	Erreà	888.com
Newcastle United	(England) Glenn Roeder	(England) Alan Shearer	Adidas	Northern Rock
Portsmouth	(England) Harry Redknapp	(Serbia and Montenegro) Dejan Stefanović	Jako	OKI Printing Solution
Sunderland	(England) Kevin Ball (caretaker)	(Republic of Ireland) Gary Breen	Lonsdale	Reg Vardy
Tottenham Hotspur	(Netherlands) Martin Jol	(England) Ledley King	Kappa	Thomson Holidays
West Bromwich Albion	(England) Bryan Robson	(England) Kevin Campbell	Diadora	T-Mobile
West Ham United	(England) Alan Pardew	(England) Nigel Reo-Coker	Reebok	JobServe
Wigan Athletic	(England) Paul Jewell	(Netherlands) Arjan de Zeeuw	JJB	JJB

1. Charlton Athletic's shirt sponsor was All:Sports until December 2005 after the company was placed into administration in September 2005.

=== Managerial changes ===
Team	Outgoing manager	Manner of departure	Date of vacancy	Position in table	Incoming manager	Date of appointment
Portsmouth	(France) Alain Perrin	Sacked	24 November 2005	17th	(England) Harry Redknapp	2 December 2005
Newcastle United	(Scotland) Graeme Souness	Sacked	2 February 2006	15th	(England) Glenn Roeder (caretaker)	2 February 2006
Sunderland	(Republic of Ireland) Mick McCarthy	Sacked	6 March 2006	20th	(England) Kevin Ball (caretaker)	7 March 2006

== League table ==
Pos	Team	Pld	W	D	L	GF	GA	GD	Pts	Qualification or relegation
1	Chelsea (C)	38	29	4	5	72	22	+50	91	Qualification for the Champions League group stage
2	Manchester United	38	25	8	5	72	34	+38	83	Qualification for the Champions League group stage
3	Liverpool	38	25	7	6	57	25	+32	82	Qualification for the Champions League third qualifying round
4	Arsenal	38	20	7	11	68	31	+37	67	Qualification for the Champions League third qualifying round
5	Tottenham Hotspur	38	18	11	9	53	38	+15	65	Qualification for the UEFA Cup first round (Note: Since Manchester United qualified for the Champions League, their place in the UEFA Cup as League Cup winners passed down to the league and was awarded to Blackburn Rovers as the highest-placed team not already qualified for European competitions.)
6	Blackburn Rovers	38	19	6	13	51	42	+9	63	Qualification for the UEFA Cup first round
7	Newcastle United	38	17	7	14	47	42	+5	58	Qualification for the Intertoto Cup third round
8	Bolton Wanderers	38	15	11	12	49	41	+8	56	
9	West Ham United	38	16	7	15	52	55	−3	55	Qualification for the UEFA Cup first round (Note: Since Liverpool had already qualified for the Champions League, their UEFA Cup berth as the FA Cup winners went to West Ham, who were the FA Cup runners-up.)
10	Wigan Athletic	38	15	6	17	45	52	−7	51	
11	Everton	38	14	8	16	34	49	−15	50	
12	Fulham	38	14	6	18	48	58	−10	48	
13	Charlton Athletic	38	13	8	17	41	55	−14	47	
14	Middlesbrough	38	12	9	17	48	58	−10	45	
15	Manchester City	38	13	4	21	43	48	−5	43	
16	Aston Villa	38	10	12	16	42	55	−13	42	
17	Portsmouth	38	10	8	20	37	62	−25	38	
18	Birmingham City (R)	38	8	10	20	28	50	−22	34	Relegation to the Football League Championship
19	West Bromwich Albion (R)	38	7	9	22	31	58	−27	30	Relegation to the Football League Championship
20	Sunderland (R)	38	3	6	29	26	69	−43	15	Relegation to the Football League Championship

Source: Barclays Premier League
Rules for classification: 1) points; 2) goal difference; 3) number of goals scored.
(C) Champions; (R) Relegated

== Results ==
Home \ Away	ARS	AVL	BIR	BLB	BOL	CHA	CHE	EVE	FUL	LIV	MCI	MUN	MID	NEW	POR	SUN	TOT	WBA	WHU	WIG
Arsenal		5–0	1–0	3–0	1–1	3–0	0–2	2–0	4–1	2–1	1–0	0–0	7–0	2–0	4–0	3–1	1–1	3–1	2–3	4–2
Aston Villa	0–0		3–1	1–0	2–2	1–0	1–1	4–0	0–0	0–2	0–1	0–2	2–3	1–2	1–0	2–1	1–1	0–0	1–2	0–2
Birmingham City	0–2	0–1		2–1	1–0	0–1	0–0	0–1	1–0	2–2	1–2	2–2	0–3	0–0	5–0	1–0	0–2	1–1	1–2	2–0
Blackburn Rovers	1–0	2–0	2–0		0–0	4–1	1–0	0–2	2–1	0–1	2–0	4–3	3–2	0–3	2–1	2–0	0–0	2–0	3–2	1–1
Bolton Wanderers	2–0	1–1	1–0	0–0		4–1	0–2	0–1	2–1	2–2	2–0	1–2	1–1	2–0	1–0	2–0	1–0	2–0	4–1	1–1
Charlton Athletic	0–1	0–0	2–0	0–2	0–1		0–2	0–0	1–1	2–0	2–5	1–3	2–1	3–1	2–1	2–0	2–3	0–0	2–0	1–0
Chelsea	1–0	2–1	2–0	4–2	5–1	1–1		3–0	3–2	2–0	2–0	3–0	1–0	3–0	2–0	2–0	2–1	4–0	4–1	1–0
Everton	1–0	4–1	0–0	1–0	0–4	3–1	1–1		3–1	1–3	1–0	0–2	1–0	1–0	0–1	2–2	0–1	2–2	1–2	0–1
Fulham	0–4	3–3	0–0	2–1	2–1	2–1	1–0	1–0		2–0	2–1	2–3	1–0	1–0	1–3	2–1	1–0	6–1	1–2	1–0
Liverpool	1–0	3–1	1–1	1–0	1–0	0–0	1–4	3–1	5–1		1–0	0–0	2–0	2–0	3–0	1–0	1–0	1–0	2–0	3–0
Manchester City	1–3	3–1	4–1	0–0	0–1	3–2	0–1	2–0	1–2	0–1		3–1	0–1	3–0	2–1	2–1	0–2	0–0	2–1	0–1
Manchester United	2–0	1–0	3–0	1–2	4–1	4–0	1–0	1–1	4–2	1–0	1–1		0–0	2–0	3–0	0–0	1–1	3–0	1–0	4–0
Middlesbrough	2–1	0–4	1–0	0–2	4–3	0–3	3–0	0–1	3–2	0–0	0–0	4–1		1–2	1–1	0–2	3–3	2–2	2–0	2–3
Newcastle United	1–0	1–1	1–0	0–1	3–1	0–0	1–0	2–0	1–1	1–3	1–0	0–2	2–2		2–0	3–2	3–1	3–0	0–0	3–1
Portsmouth	1–1	1–1	1–1	2–2	1–1	1–2	0–2	0–1	1–0	1–3	2–1	1–3	1–0	0–0		2–1	0–2	1–0	1–1	0–2
Sunderland	0–3	1–3	0–1	0–1	0–0	1–3	1–2	0–1	2–1	0–2	1–2	1–3	0–3	1–4	1–4		1–1	1–1	1–1	0–1
Tottenham Hotspur	1–1	0–0	2–0	3–2	1–0	3–1	0–2	2–0	1–0	0–0	2–1	1–2	2–0	2–0	3–1	3–2		2–1	1–1	2–2
West Bromwich Albion	2–1	1–2	2–3	2–0	0–0	1–2	1–2	4–0	0–0	0–2	2–0	1–2	0–2	0–3	2–1	0–1	2–0		0–1	1–2
West Ham United	0–0	4–0	3–0	3–1	1–2	0–0	1–3	2–2	2–1	1–2	1–0	1–2	2–1	2–4	2–4	2–0	2–1	1–0		0–2
Wigan Athletic	2–3	3–2	1–1	0–3	2–1	3–0	0–1	1–1	1–0	0–1	4–3	1–2	1–1	1–0	1–2	1–0	1–2	0–1	1–2	

Source: Barclays Premier League
Legend: Blue = home team win; Yellow = draw; Red = away team win.

== Top scorers ==
Rank	Player	Club	Goals
1	(France) Thierry Henry	Arsenal	27
2	(Netherlands) Ruud van Nistelrooy	Manchester United	21
3	(England) Darren Bent	Charlton Athletic	18
4	(Republic of Ireland) Robbie Keane	Tottenham Hotspur	16
4	(England) Frank Lampard	Chelsea	16
4	(England) Wayne Rooney	Manchester United	16
7	(England) Marlon Harewood	West Ham United	14
8	(Wales) Craig Bellamy	Blackburn Rovers	13
8	(Nigeria) Yakubu	Middlesbrough	13
10	(Senegal) Henri Camara	Wigan Athletic	12
10	(Ivory Coast) Didier Drogba	Chelsea	12

== Awards ==
=== Monthly awards ===
Month	Manager of the Month		Player of the Month		Reference
Month	Manager	Club	Player	Club	Reference
August	(England) Stuart Pearce	Manchester City	(England) Darren Bent	Charlton Athletic	
September	(England) Paul Jewell	Wigan Athletic	(England) Danny Murphy	Charlton Athletic	
October	(England) Paul Jewell	Wigan Athletic	(England) Frank Lampard	Chelsea	
November	(Spain) Rafael Benítez	Liverpool	(Netherlands) Robin van Persie	Arsenal	
December	(Spain) Rafael Benítez	Liverpool	(England) Wayne Rooney	Manchester United	
January	(Scotland) David Moyes	Everton	(England) Anton Ferdinand	West Ham United	
February	(England) Alan Pardew	West Ham United	(England) Kevin Nolan	Bolton Wanderers	
March	(Scotland) Sir Alex Ferguson	Manchester United	(England) Wayne Rooney	Manchester United	
April	(England) Harry Redknapp	Portsmouth	(England) Steven Gerrard	Liverpool	

=== Annual awards ===
Award	Winner	Club
PFA Players' Player of the Year	(England) Steven Gerrard	Liverpool
PFA Young Player of the Year	(England) Wayne Rooney	Manchester United
PFA Fans' Player of the Year	(England) Wayne Rooney	Manchester United
FWA Footballer of the Year	(France) Thierry Henry	Arsenal
Premier League Player of the Season	(France) Thierry Henry	Arsenal
Premier League Manager of the Season	(Portugal) José Mourinho	Chelsea

PFA Team of the Year

PFA Team of the Year
Goalkeeper	(Republic of Ireland) Shay Given (Newcastle United)			
Defenders	(France) Pascal Chimbonda (Wigan Athletic)	(England) John Terry (Chelsea)	(England) Jamie Carragher (Liverpool)	(France) William Gallas (Chelsea)
Midfielders	(Portugal) Cristiano Ronaldo (Manchester United)	(England) Steven Gerrard (Liverpool)	(England) Frank Lampard (Chelsea)	(England) Joe Cole (Chelsea)
Forwards	(France) Thierry Henry (Arsenal)		(England) Wayne Rooney (Manchester United)	

== Attendances ==
No.	Club	Matches	Total attendance	Average
1	Manchester United	19	1,306,528	68,765
2	Newcastle United	19	988,609	52,032
3	Liverpool FC	19	840,491	44,236
4	Manchester City	19	814,269	42,856
5	Chelsea FC	19	796,131	41,902
6	Arsenal FC	19	725,499	38,184
7	Everton FC	19	700,347	36,860
8	Tottenham Hotspur	19	685,399	36,074
9	Aston Villa	19	648,124	34,112
10	Sunderland AFC	19	644,180	33,904
11	West Ham United	19	641,109	33,743
12	Middlesbrough FC	19	540,799	28,463
13	Birmingham City	19	520,448	27,392
14	Charlton Athletic	19	497,721	26,196
15	Bolton Wanderers	19	483,636	25,455
16	West Bromwich Albion	19	482,667	25,404
17	Blackburn Rovers	19	399,288	21,015
18	Fulham FC	19	392,430	20,654
19	Wigan Athletic	19	391,587	20,610
20	Portsmouth FC	19	376,951	19,840

== See also ==
- 2005–06 in English football
