= Performance record of clubs in the Premier League =

Since inception in 1992 there have been 51 clubs who have played in the Premier League. Seven clubs have won the Premier League: Manchester United (thirteen times), Manchester City (eight times), Chelsea (five times), Arsenal (four times), Liverpool (twice) Blackburn Rovers (once) and Leicester City (once).

== Record of finishing positions of clubs in the Premier League ==
Table correct as at the end of the 2025–26 Premier League season.

| Club | Best result | 92– 93 | 93– 94 | 94– 95 | 95– 96 | 96– 97 | 97– 98 | 98– 99 | 99– 00 | 00– 01 | 01– 02 | 02– 03 | 03– 04 | 04– 05 | 05– 06 | 06– 07 | 07– 08 | 08– 09 | 09– 10 | 10– 11 | 11– 12 | 12– 13 | 13– 14 | 14– 15 | 15– 16 | 16– 17 | 17– 18 | 18– 19 | 19– 20 | 20– 21 | 21– 22 | 22– 23 | 23– 24 | 24– 25 | 25– 26 | Ref. |
|---|---|---|---|---|---|---|---|---|---|---|---|---|---|---|---|---|---|---|---|---|---|---|---|---|---|---|---|---|---|---|---|---|---|---|---|---|
| **Manchester United** | 1st (x13) | **1** | **1** | 2 | **1** | **1** | 2 | **1** | **1** | **1** | 3 | **1** | 3 | 3 | 2 | **1** | **1** | **1** | 2 | **1** | 2 | **1** | 7 | 4 | 5 | 6^{EL} | 2 | 6 | 3 | 2 | 6 | 3 | 8^{FA} | 15 | 3 | |
| **Manchester City** | 1st (x8) | 9 | 16 | 17 | 18 | • | • | • | • | 18 | • | 9^{FP} | 16 | 8 | 15 | 14 | 9^{FP} | 10 | 5 | 3 | **1** | 2 | **1** | 2 | 4 | 3 | **1** | **1** | 2 | **1** | **1** | **1** | **1** | 3 | 2 | |
| **Chelsea** | 1st (x5) | 11 | 14^{FA} | 11 | 11 | 6^{FA} | 4^{CW} | 3 | 5 | 6 | 6 | 4 | 2 | **1** | **1** | 2 | 2 | 3 | **1** | 2 | 6^{CL} | 3 | 3 | **1** | 10 | **1** | 5 | 3 | 4 | 4 | 3 | 12 | 6 | 4 | 10 | |
| **Arsenal** | 1st (x4) | 10^{FA} | 4^{CW} | 12 | 5 | 3 | **1** | 2 | 2 | 2 | **1** | 2 | **1** | 2 | 4 | 4 | 3 | 4 | 3 | 4 | 3 | 4 | 4 | 3 | 2 | 5 | 6 | 5 | 8^{FA} | 8 | 5 | 2 | 2 | 2 | **1** | |
| **Liverpool** | 1st (x2) | 6 | 8 | 4 | 3^{FA} | 4 | 3 | 7 | 4 | 3 | 2 | 5 | 4 | 5^{CL} | 3 | 3 | 4 | 2 | 7 | 6 | 8^{LC} | 7 | 2 | 6 | 8 | 4 | 4 | 2 | **1** | 3 | 2 | 5 | 3 | **1** | 5 | |
| Blackburn Rovers | 1st | 4 | 2 | **1** | 7 | 13 | 6 | 19 | • | • | 10^{LC} | 6 | 15 | 15 | 6 | 10 | 7 | 15 | 10 | 15 | 19 | • | • | • | • | • | • | • | • | • | • | • | • | • | • | |
| Leicester City | 1st | • | • | 21 | • | 9^{LC} | 10 | 10 | 8^{LC} | 13 | 20 | • | 18 | • | • | • | • | • | • | • | • | • | • | 14 | **1** | 12 | 9 | 9 | 5 | 5^{FA} | 8 | 18 | • | 18 | • | |
| **Newcastle United** | 2nd (x2) | • | 3 | 6 | 2 | 2 | 13^{FA} | 13^{FA} | 11 | 11 | 4 | 3 | 5 | 14 | 7 | 13 | 12 | 18 | • | 12 | 5 | 16 | 10 | 15 | 18 | • | 10 | 13 | 13 | 12 | 11 | 4 | 7 | 5 | 12 | |
| **Aston Villa** | 2nd | 2 | 10^{LC} | 18 | 4 | 5 | 7 | 6 | 6 | 8 | 8 | 16 | 6 | 10 | 16 | 11 | 6 | 6 | 6 | 9 | 16 | 15 | 15 | 17 | 20 | • | • | • | 17 | 11 | 14 | 7 | 4 | 6 | 4 | |
| **Tottenham Hotspur** | 2nd | 8 | 15 | 7 | 8 | 10 | 14 | 11^{LC} | 10 | 12 | 9 | 10 | 14 | 9 | 5 | 5 | 11^{LC} | 8 | 4 | 5 | 4^{[a]} | 5 | 6 | 5 | 3 | 2 | 3 | 4 | 6 | 7 | 4 | 8 | 5 | 17^{EL} | 17 | |
| Norwich City | 3rd | 3 | 12 | 20 | • | • | • | • | • | • | • | • | • | 19 | • | • | • | • | • | • | 12 | 11 | 18 | • | 19 | • | • | • | 20 | • | 20 | • | • | • | • | |
| **Nottingham Forest** | 3rd | 22 | • | 3 | 9 | 20 | • | 20 | • | • | • | • | • | • | • | • | • | • | • | • | • | • | • | • | • | • | • | • | • | • | • | 16 | 17 | 7^{[c]} | 16 | |
| **Leeds United** | 3rd | 17 | 5 | 5 | 13 | 11 | 5 | 4 | 3 | 4 | 5 | 15 | 19 | • | • | • | • | • | • | • | • | • | • | • | • | • | • | • | • | 9 | 17 | 19 | • | • | 14 | |
| **Everton** | 4th | 13 | 17 | 15^{FA} | 6 | 15 | 17 | 14 | 13 | 16 | 15 | 7 | 17 | 4 | 11 | 6 | 5 | 5 | 8 | 7 | 7 | 6 | 5 | 11 | 11 | 7 | 8 | 8 | 12 | 10 | 16 | 17 | 15 | 13 | 13 | |
| Queens Park Rangers | 5th | 5 | 9 | 8 | 19 | • | • | • | • | • | • | • | • | • | • | • | • | • | • | • | 17 | 20 | • | 20 | • | • | • | • | • | • | • | • | • | • | • | |
| West Ham United | 5th | • | 13 | 14 | 10 | 14 | 8 | 5 | 9 | 15 | 7 | 18 | • | • | 9^{FA} | 15 | 10 | 9 | 17 | 20 | • | 10 | 13 | 12^{FP} | 7 | 11 | 13 | 10 | 16 | 6 | 7 | 14^{ECL} | 9 | 14 | 18 | |
| **Ipswich Town** | 5th | 16 | 19 | 22 | • | • | • | • | • | 5 | 18^{FP} | • | • | • | • | • | • | • | • | • | • | • | • | • | • | • | • | • | • | • | • | • | • | 19 | • | |
| Wimbledon | 6th | 12 | 6 | 9 | 14 | 8 | 15 | 16 | 18 | • | • | • | • | • | • | • | • | • | • | • | • | • | • | • | • | • | • | • | • | • | • | • | • | • | • | |
| Bolton Wanderers | 6th | • | • | • | 20 | • | 18 | • | • | • | 16 | 17 | 8 | 6 | 8 | 7 | 16 | 13 | 14 | 14 | 18 | • | • | • | • | • | • | • | • | • | • | • | • | • | • | |
| Southampton | 6th | 18 | 18 | 10 | 17 | 16 | 12 | 17 | 15 | 10 | 11 | 8^{FA} | 12 | 20 | • | • | • | • | • | • | • | 14 | 8 | 7 | 6 | 8 | 17 | 16 | 11 | 15 | 15 | 20 | • | 20 | • | |
| **Brighton & Hove Albion** | 6th | • | • | • | • | • | • | • | • | • | • | • | • | • | • | • | • | • | • | • | • | • | • | • | • | • | 15 | 17 | 15 | 16 | 9 | 6 | 11 | 8 | 8 | |
| **Bournemouth** | 6th | • | • | • | • | • | • | • | • | • | • | • | • | • | • | • | • | • | • | • | • | • | • | • | 16 | 9 | 12 | 14 | 18 | • | • | 15 | 12 | 9 | 6 | |
| **Sunderland** | 7th (x3) | • | • | • | • | 18 | • | • | 7 | 7 | 17 | 20 | • | • | 20 | • | 15 | 16 | 13 | 10 | 13 | 17 | 14 | 16 | 17 | 20 | • | • | • | • | • | • | • | • | 7 | |
| Sheffield Wednesday | 7th (x3) | 7 | 7 | 13 | 15 | 7 | 16 | 12 | 19 | • | • | • | • | • | • | • | • | • | • | • | • | • | • | • | • | • | • | • | • | • | • | • | • | • | • | |
| Wolverhampton Wanderers | 7th (x2) | • | • | • | • | • | • | • | • | • | • | • | 20 | • | • | • | • | • | 15 | 17 | 20 | • | • | • | • | • | • | 7 | 7 | 13 | 10 | 13 | 14 | 16 | 20 | |
| Charlton Athletic | 7th | • | • | • | • | • | • | 18 | • | 9 | 14 | 12 | 7 | 11 | 13 | 19 | • | • | • | • | • | • | • | • | • | • | • | • | • | • | • | • | • | • | • | |
| Middlesbrough | 7th | 21 | • | • | 12 | 19 | • | 9 | 12 | 14 | 12 | 11 | 11^{LC} | 7 | 14 | 12 | 13 | 19 | • | • | • | • | • | • | • | 19 | • | • | • | • | • | • | • | • | • | |
| **Fulham** | 7th | • | • | • | • | • | • | • | • | • | 13 | 14 | 9 | 13 | 12 | 16 | 17 | 7 | 12 | 8^{FP} | 9 | 12 | 19 | • | • | • | • | 19 | • | 18 | • | 10 | 13 | 11 | 11 | |
| Burnley | 7th | • | • | • | • | • | • | • | • | • | • | • | • | • | • | • | • | • | 18 | • | • | • | • | 19 | • | 16 | 7 | 15 | 10 | 17 | 18 | • | 19 | • | 19 | |
| Derby County | 8th | • | • | • | • | 12 | 9 | 8 | 16 | 17 | 19 | • | • | • | • | • | 20 | • | • | • | • | • | • | • | • | • | • | • | • | • | • | • | • | • | • | |
| Reading | 8th | • | • | • | • | • | • | • | • | • | • | • | • | • | • | 8 | 18 | • | • | • | • | 19 | • | • | • | • | • | • | • | • | • | • | • | • | • | |
| Portsmouth | 8th | • | • | • | • | • | • | • | • | • | • | • | 13 | 16 | 17 | 9 | 8^{FA} | 14 | 20^{[b]} | • | • | • | • | • | • | • | • | • | • | • | • | • | • | • | • | |
| West Bromwich Albion | 8th | • | • | • | • | • | • | • | • | • | • | 19 | • | 17 | 19 | • | • | 20 | • | 11 | 10 | 8 | 17 | 13 | 14 | 10 | 20 | • | • | 19 | • | • | • | • | • | |
| Swansea City | 8th | • | • | • | • | • | • | • | • | • | • | • | • | • | • | • | • | • | • | • | 11 | 9^{LC} | 12 | 8 | 12 | 15 | 18 | • | • | • | • | • | • | • | • | |
| Stoke City | 9th (x3) | • | • | • | • | • | • | • | • | • | • | • | • | • | • | • | • | 12 | 11 | 13^{FA} | 14 | 13 | 9 | 9 | 9 | 13 | 19 | • | • | • | • | • | • | • | • | |
| Birmingham City | 9th | • | • | • | • | • | • | • | • | • | • | 13 | 10 | 12 | 18 | • | 19 | • | 9 | 18^{LC} | • | • | • | • | • | • | • | • | • | • | • | • | • | • | • | |
| Sheffield United | 9th | 14 | 20 | • | • | • | • | • | • | • | • | • | • | • | • | 18 | • | • | • | • | • | • | • | • | • | • | • | • | 9 | 20 | • | • | 20 | • | • | |
| **Brentford** | 9th | • | • | • | • | • | • | • | • | • | • | • | • | • | • | • | • | • | • | • | • | • | • | • | • | • | • | • | • | • | 13 | 9 | 16 | 10 | 9 | |
| **Crystal Palace** | 10th (x2) | 20 | • | 19 | • | • | 20 | • | • | • | • | • | • | 18 | • | • | • | • | • | • | • | • | 11 | 10 | 15 | 14 | 11 | 12 | 14 | 14 | 12 | 11 | 10 | 12^{FA}^{[c]} | 15^{ECL} | |
| Wigan Athletic | 10th | • | • | • | • | • | • | • | • | • | • | • | • | • | 10 | 17 | 14 | 11 | 16 | 16 | 15 | 18^{FA} | • | • | • | • | • | • | • | • | • | • | • | • | • | |
| **Coventry City** | 11th (x2) | 15 | 11 | 16 | 16 | 17 | 11 | 15 | 14 | 19 | • | • | • | • | • | • | • | • | • | • | • | • | • | • | • | • | • | • | • | • | • | • | • | • | • | |
| Watford | 11th | • | • | • | • | • | • | • | 20 | • | • | • | • | • | • | 20 | • | • | • | • | • | • | • | • | 13 | 17 | 14 | 11 | 19 | • | 19 | • | • | • | • | |
| **Hull City** | 16th | • | • | • | • | • | • | • | • | • | • | • | • | • | • | • | • | 17 | 19 | • | • | • | 16^{FA} | 18 | • | 18 | • | • | • | • | • | • | • | • | • | |
| Huddersfield Town | 16th | • | • | • | • | • | • | • | • | • | • | • | • | • | • | • | • | • | • | • | • | • | • | • | • | • | 16 | 20 | • | • | • | • | • | • | • | |
| Bradford City | 17th | • | • | • | • | • | • | • | 17 | 20 | • | • | • | • | • | • | • | • | • | • | • | • | • | • | • | • | • | • | • | • | • | • | • | • | • | |
| Cardiff City | 18th | • | • | • | • | • | • | • | • | • | • | • | • | • | • | • | • | • | • | • | • | • | 20 | • | • | • | • | 18 | • | • | • | • | • | • | • | |
| Luton Town | 18th | • | • | • | • | • | • | • | • | • | • | • | • | • | • | • | • | • | • | • | • | • | • | • | • | • | • | • | • | • | • | • | 18 | • | • | |
| Oldham Athletic | 19th | 19 | 21 | • | • | • | • | • | • | • | • | • | • | • | • | • | • | • | • | • | • | • | • | • | • | • | • | • | • | • | • | • | • | • | • | |
| Barnsley | 19th | • | • | • | • | • | 19 | • | • | • | • | • | • | • | • | • | • | • | • | • | • | • | • | • | • | • | • | • | • | • | • | • | • | • | • | |
| Blackpool | 19th | • | • | • | • | • | • | • | • | • | • | • | • | • | • | • | • | • | • | 19 | • | • | • | • | • | • | • | • | • | • | • | • | • | • | • | |
| Swindon Town | 22nd | • | 22 | • | • | • | • | • | • | • | • | • | • | • | • | • | • | • | • | • | • | • | • | • | • | • | • | • | • | • | • | • | • | • | • | |

Team names in bold indicate the club is a current Premier League member

| | League champion and qualified for the UEFA Champions League |
| | Qualified for the UEFA Champions League |
| | Qualified for the UEFA Cup or UEFA Europa League |
| | Qualified for the UEFA Cup Winners' Cup |
| | Qualified for the UEFA Intertoto Cup |
| | Qualified for the UEFA Conference League |
| | Premier League club, but did not qualify for any European tournament |
| • | Absent from the list of clubs that participated in that season's Premier League |

| Italics | Indicates that the team qualified for a European tournament that season, but not based upon the performance in the Premier League. The superscript identifies the route used for European qualification. |
| RED | Indicates that the team were relegated from the Premier League to the EFL Championship. |

^^{[a]}Liverpool won the 2011–12 UEFA Champions League, pursuant to the rules in effect at the time, only four clubs from the Premier League could play in the Champions League. This meant that Chelsea, who would usually qualify for the Champions League with a 4th place Premier League finish, were relegated to the 2012–13 UEFA Europa League instead.

^^{[b]}Originally Portsmouth qualified for the third qualifying round of the UEFA Europa League as FA Cup runners-up, replacing the Champions League-qualified Chelsea. However, they failed to apply for a UEFA licence. Therefore, Liverpool took their place.

^^{[c]}Originally Crystal Palace qualified for the UEFA Europa League as FA Cup winners, and Nottingham Forest qualified for the UEFA Conference League. However, due to Crystal Palace being in breach of multi-club ownership rules, with Lyon also qualifying for the Europa League, they were demoted to the Conference League. Nottingham Forest were promoted from the Conference League to the Europa League.

Source: Premier League website

== See also ==
- UEFA Champions League clubs performance comparison
- List of English football champions
- Football records and statistics in England
