= List of Premier League winning players =

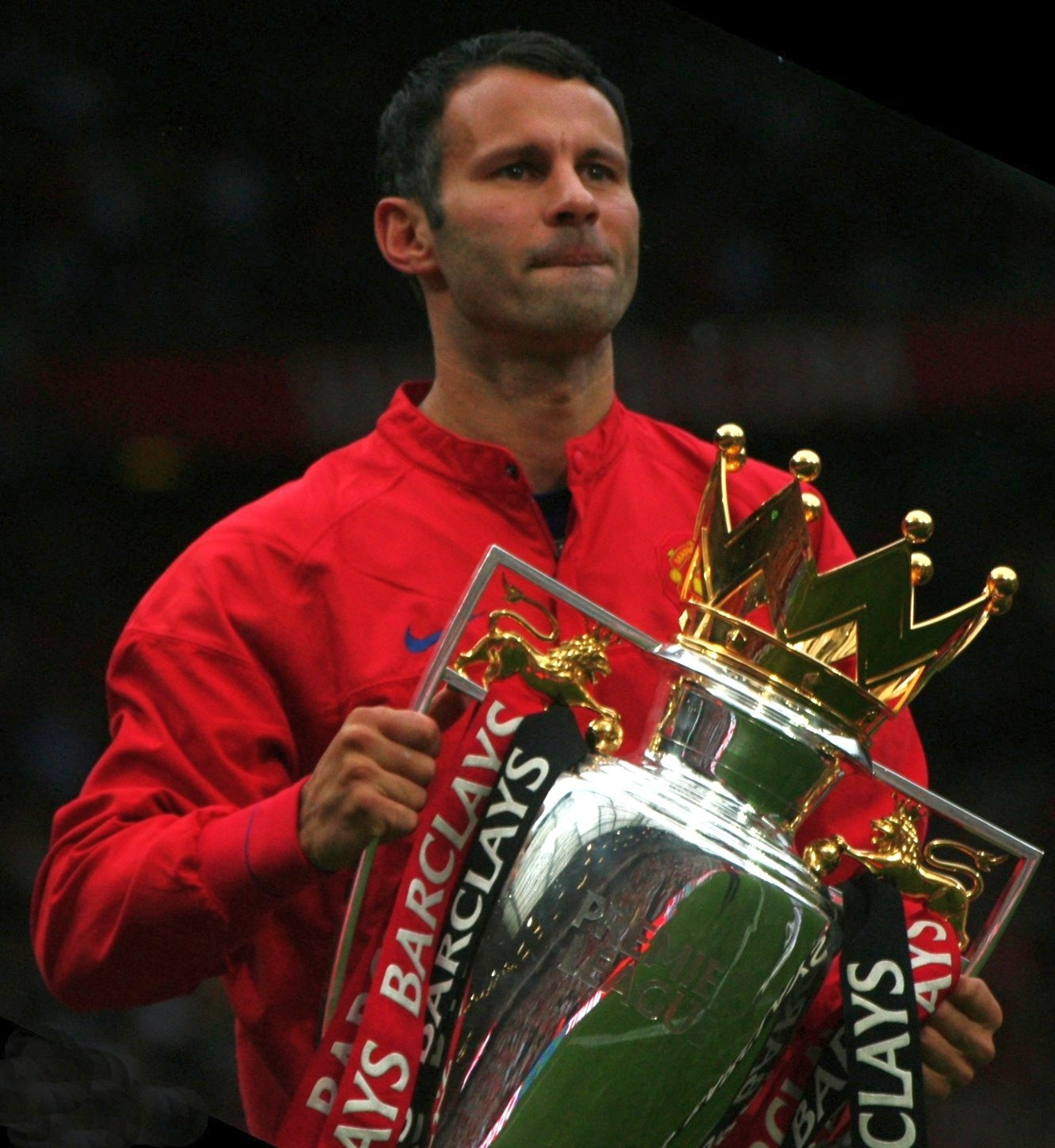
Ryan Giggs has more Premier League medals than any other player, winning the title 13 times with Manchester United.

The Premier League is an association football league that serves as the top tier of the English football league system. The league was founded in 1992 when the clubs of the First Division decided to break away from the Football League, as a commercially independent entity that negotiated its own broadcast and sponsorship agreements.

Since the 2012–13 season, a player needs to have played in a minimum of five matches for a title-winning team to qualify for a medal. This is down from the previous standard of 10 matches played. At the discretion of the Premier League board, additional medals can be awarded to players who played less than five matches. This special dispensation is usually reserved for back-up goalkeepers and players who did not make the minimum number of appearances through injury. For the first season in 1992–93, players received a miniature version of the trophy rather than a medal.

As of the end of the 2025–26 season, seven clubs have won the title – Manchester United, Blackburn Rovers, Arsenal, Chelsea, Manchester City, Leicester City and Liverpool – with 683 medals awarded to 344 players. Eleven players have won the title with more than one club. Having won 13 Premier League championships, Manchester United have more title-winning players to their name than any other club, with 86 players awarded 247 medals. Ryan Giggs, who spent his entire career at the club, has won more medals than any other player with 13. Nearly a third of medals have been awarded to English players, with the next most frequent nationalities of winners being French and Brazilian.

== Key ==
- The list is initially ordered first by number of medals, then by season, and then if necessary by alphabetical order.
- Position key: GK – Goalkeeper; DF – Defender; MF – Midfielder; FW – Forward.
- Club (X) denotes the number of times a player won a medal with that club.

== List of Premier League winning players ==
As of end of 2025–26 season

List of Premier League winning players
Player	No.	Nat.	Pos.	Club(s)	Season(s)	Notes	Ref.
Ryan Giggs	13	WAL	MF	Manchester United	1992–93, 1993–94, 1995–96, 1996–97, 1998–99, 1999–2000, 2000–01, 2002–03, 2006–07, 2007–08, 2008–09, 2010–11, 2012–13	(Note: Most medals for a single player.)	
Paul Scholes	11	ENG	MF	Manchester United	1995–96, 1996–97, 1998–99, 1999–2000, 2000–01, 2002–03, 2006–07, 2007–08, 2008–09, 2010–11, 2012–13		
Gary Neville	8	ENG	DF	Manchester United	1995–96, 1996–97, 1998–99, 1999–2000, 2000–01, 2002–03, 2006–07, 2008–09		
Denis Irwin	7	IRL	DF	Manchester United	1992–93, 1993–94, 1995–96, 1996–97, 1998–99, 1999–2000, 2000–01		
Roy Keane	7	IRL	MF	Manchester United	1993–94, 1995–96, 1996–97, 1998–99, 1999–2000, 2000–01, 2002–03		
David Beckham	6	ENG	MF	Manchester United	1995–96, 1996–97, 1998–99, 1999–2000, 2000–01, 2002–03		
Nicky Butt	6	ENG	MF	Manchester United	1995–96, 1996–97, 1998–99, 1999–2000, 2000–01, 2002–03		
Phil Neville	6	ENG	MF	Manchester United	1995–96, 1996–97, 1998–99, 1999–2000, 2000–01, 2002–03		
Ole Gunnar Solskjær	6	NOR	FW	Manchester United	1996–97, 1998–99, 1999–2000, 2000–01, 2002–03, 2006–07		
Rio Ferdinand	6	ENG	DF	Manchester United	2002–03, 2006–07, 2007–08, 2008–09, 2010–11, 2012–13		
Kevin De Bruyne	6	BEL	MF	Manchester City	2017–18, 2018–19, 2020–21, 2021–22, 2022–23, 2023–24		
Ederson	6	BRA	GK	Manchester City	2017–18, 2018–19, 2020–21, 2021–22, 2022–23, 2023–24		
Phil Foden	6	ENG	MF	Manchester City	2017–18, 2018–19, 2020–21, 2021–22, 2022–23, 2023–24		
Bernardo Silva	6	POR	MF	Manchester City	2017–18, 2018–19, 2020–21, 2021–22, 2022–23, 2023–24		
John Stones	6	ENG	DF	Manchester City	2017–18, 2018–19, 2020–21, 2021–22, 2022–23, 2023–24		
Kyle Walker	6	ENG	DF	Manchester City	2017–18, 2018–19, 2020–21, 2021–22, 2022–23, 2023–24		
Peter Schmeichel	5	DEN	GK	Manchester United	1992–93, 1993–94, 1995–96, 1996–97, 1998–99		
Andy Cole	5	ENG	FW	Manchester United	1995–96, 1996–97, 1998–99, 1999–2000, 2000–01		
Wes Brown	5	ENG	DF	Manchester United	1998–99, 2000–01, 2002–03, 2006–07, 2007–08		
John O'Shea	5	IRL	DF	Manchester United	2002–03, 2006–07, 2007–08, 2008–09, 2010–11		
John Terry	5	ENG	DF	Chelsea	2004–05, 2005–06, 2009–10, 2014–15, 2016–17		
Michael Carrick	5	ENG	MF	Manchester United	2006–07, 2007–08, 2008–09, 2010–11, 2012–13		
Patrice Evra	5	FRA	DF	Manchester United	2006–07, 2007–08, 2008–09, 2010–11, 2012–13		
Darren Fletcher	5	SCO	MF	Manchester United	2006–07, 2007–08, 2008–09, 2010–11, 2012–13		
Wayne Rooney	5	ENG	FW	Manchester United	2006–07, 2007–08, 2008–09, 2010–11, 2012–13		
Nemanja Vidić	5	SRB	DF	Manchester United	2006–07, 2007–08, 2008–09, 2010–11, 2012–13		
Sergio Agüero	5	ARG	FW	Manchester City	2011–12, 2013–14, 2017–18, 2018–19, 2020–21		
Fernandinho	5	BRA	MF	Manchester City	2013–14, 2017–18, 2018–19, 2020–21, 2021–22		
Riyad Mahrez	5	ALG	FW	Leicester City (1), Manchester City (4)	2015–16, 2018–19, 2020–21, 2021–22, 2022–23		
İlkay Gündoğan	5	GER	MF	Manchester City	2017–18, 2018–19, 2020–21, 2021–22, 2022–23		
Aymeric Laporte	5	ESP	DF	Manchester City	2017–18, 2018–19, 2020–21, 2021–22, 2022–23		
Gabriel Jesus	5	BRA	FW	Manchester City (4), Arsenal (1)	2017–18, 2018–19, 2020–21, 2021–22, 2025–26		
Eric Cantona	4	FRA	FW	Manchester United	1992–93, 1993–94, 1995–96, 1996–97		
Brian McClair	4	SCO	FW	Manchester United	1992–93, 1993–94, 1995–96, 1996–97		
Gary Pallister	4	ENG	DF	Manchester United	1992–93, 1993–94, 1995–96, 1996–97		
Mikaël Silvestre	4	FRA	DF	Manchester United	1999–2000, 2000–01, 2002–03, 2006–07		
Petr Čech	4	CZE	GK	Chelsea	2004–05, 2005–06, 2009–10, 2014–15		
Didier Drogba	4	CIV	FW	Chelsea	2004–05, 2005–06, 2009–10, 2014–15		
Park Ji-sung	4	KOR	MF	Manchester United	2006–07, 2007–08, 2008–09, 2010–11		
Edwin van der Sar	4	NED	GK	Manchester United	2006–07, 2007–08, 2008–09, 2010–11	(Note: Oldest medal winner aged 40 years, 205 days.)	
Anderson	4	BRA	MF	Manchester United	2007–08, 2008–09, 2010–11, 2012–13		
Nani	4	POR	FW	Manchester United	2007–08, 2008–09, 2010–11, 2012–13		
Vincent Kompany	4	BEL	DF	Manchester City	2011–12, 2013–14, 2017–18, 2018–19		
David Silva	4	ESP	MF	Manchester City	2011–12, 2013–14, 2017–18, 2018–19		
Raheem Sterling	4	ENG	FW	Manchester City	2017–18, 2018–19, 2020–21, 2021–22		
Oleksandr Zinchenko	4	UKR	DF	Manchester City	2017–18, 2018–19, 2020–21, 2021–22		
Nathan Aké	4	NED	DF	Manchester City	2020–21, 2021–22, 2022–23, 2023–24		
Rúben Dias	4	POR	DF	Manchester City	2020–21, 2021–22, 2022–23, 2023–24		
Rodri	4	ESP	MF	Manchester City	2020–21, 2021–22, 2022–23, 2023–24		
Steve Bruce	3	ENG	DF	Manchester United	1992–93, 1993–94, 1995–96		
Lee Sharpe	3	ENG	MF	Manchester United	1992–93, 1993–94, 1995–96		
Henning Berg	3	NOR	DF	Blackburn Rovers (1), Manchester United (2)	1994–95, 1998–99, 1999–2000	(Note: First player to win medals with two clubs.)	
Ronny Johnsen	3	NOR	DF	Manchester United	1996–97, 1998–99, 2000–01		
Dennis Bergkamp	3	NED	FW	Arsenal	1997–98, 2001–02, 2003–04		
Martin Keown	3	ENG	DF	Arsenal	1997–98, 2001–02, 2003–04		
Ray Parlour	3	ENG	MF	Arsenal	1997–98, 2001–02, 2003–04		
Patrick Vieira	3	FRA	MF	Arsenal	1997–98, 2001–02, 2003–04		
Teddy Sheringham	3	ENG	FW	Manchester United	1998–99, 1999–2000, 2000–01		
Jaap Stam	3	NED	DF	Manchester United	1998–99, 1999–2000, 2000–01		
Dwight Yorke	3	TRI	MF	Manchester United	1998–99, 1999–2000, 2000–01		
Ashley Cole	3	ENG	DF	Arsenal (2), Chelsea (1)	2001–02, 2003–04, 2009–10		
Gaël Clichy	3	FRA	DF	Arsenal (1), Manchester City (2)	2003–04, 2011–12, 2013–14		
Ricardo Carvalho	3	POR	DF	Chelsea	2004–05, 2005–06, 2009–10		
Joe Cole	3	ENG	MF	Chelsea	2004–05, 2005–06, 2009–10		
Paulo Ferreira	3	POR	DF	Chelsea	2004–05, 2005–06, 2009–10		
Robert Huth	3	GER	DF	Chelsea (2), Leicester City (1)	2004–05, 2005–06, 2015–16		
Frank Lampard	3	ENG	MF	Chelsea	2004–05, 2005–06, 2009–10		
Cristiano Ronaldo	3	POR	FW	Manchester United	2006–07, 2007–08, 2008–09		
Tomasz Kuszczak	3	POL	GK	Manchester United	2006–07, 2007–08, 2010–11		
Carlos Tevez	3	ARG	FW	Manchester United (2), Manchester City (1)	2007–08, 2008–09, 2011–12		
Jonny Evans	3	NIR	DF	Manchester United	2008–09, 2010–11, 2012–13		
Rafael	3	BRA	DF	Manchester United	2008–09, 2010–11, 2012–13		
Branislav Ivanović	3	SRB	DF	Chelsea	2009–10, 2014–15, 2016–17		
James Milner	3	ENG	MF	Manchester City (2), Liverpool (1)	2011–12, 2013–14, 2019–20		
Yaya Touré	3	CIV	MF	Manchester City	2011–12, 2013–14, 2017–18		
Benjamin Mendy	3	FRA	DF	Manchester City	2017–18, 2018–19, 2020–21		
João Cancelo	3	POR	DF	Manchester City	2020–21, 2021–22, 2022–23		
Jack Grealish	3	ENG	MF	Manchester City	2021–22, 2022–23, 2023–24		
Mark Hughes	2	WAL	FW	Manchester United	1992–93, 1993–94		
Paul Ince	2	ENG	MF	Manchester United	1992–93, 1993–94		
Andrei Kanchelskis	2	RUS	FW	Manchester United	1992–93, 1993–94		
Paul Parker	2	ENG	DF	Manchester United	1992–93, 1993–94		
Bryan Robson	2	ENG	MF	Manchester United	1992–93, 1993–94		
David May	2	ENG	DF	Manchester United	1995–96, 1996–97		
Tony Adams	2	ENG	DF	Arsenal	1997–98, 2001–02		
Nicolas Anelka	2	FRA	FW	Arsenal (1), Chelsea (1)	1997–98, 2009–10		
Lee Dixon	2	ENG	DF	Arsenal	1997–98, 2001–02		
Gilles Grimandi	2	FRA	DF	Arsenal	1997–98, 2001–02		
David Seaman	2	ENG	GK	Arsenal	1997–98, 2001–02		
Raimond van der Gouw	2	NED	GK	Manchester United	1999–2000, 2000–01		
Fabien Barthez	2	FRA	GK	Manchester United	2000–01, 2002–03		
Sol Campbell	2	ENG	DF	Arsenal	2001–02, 2003–04		
Edu	2	BRA	MF	Arsenal	2001–02, 2003–04		
Thierry Henry	2	FRA	FW	Arsenal	2001–02, 2003–04		
Nwankwo Kanu	2	NGA	FW	Arsenal	2001–02, 2003–04		
Lauren	2	CMR	DF	Arsenal	2001–02, 2003–04		
Freddie Ljungberg	2	SWE	MF	Arsenal	2001–02, 2003–04		
Robert Pires	2	FRA	MF	Arsenal	2001–02, 2003–04		
Sylvain Wiltord	2	FRA	FW	Arsenal	2001–02, 2003–04		
Kolo Touré	2	CIV	DF	Arsenal (1), Manchester City (1)	2003–04, 2011–12		
Damien Duff	2	IRL	MF	Chelsea	2004–05, 2005–06		
William Gallas	2	FRA	DF	Chelsea	2004–05, 2005–06		
Geremi	2	CMR	MF	Chelsea	2004–05, 2005–06		
Eiður Guðjohnsen	2	ISL	FW	Chelsea	2004–05, 2005–06		
Claude Makélélé	2	FRA	MF	Chelsea	2004–05, 2005–06		
Arjen Robben	2	NED	FW	Chelsea	2004–05, 2005–06		
Michael Essien	2	GHA	MF	Chelsea	2005–06, 2009–10		
Louis Saha	2	FRA	FW	Manchester United	2006–07, 2007–08		
Dimitar Berbatov	2	BUL	FW	Manchester United	2008–09, 2010–11		
Mikel John Obi	2	NGA	MF	Chelsea	2009–10, 2014–15		
Javier Hernández	2	MEX	FW	Manchester United	2010–11, 2012–13		
Chris Smalling	2	ENG	DF	Manchester United	2010–11, 2012–13		
Antonio Valencia	2	ECU	DF	Manchester United	2010–11, 2012–13		
Edin Džeko	2	BIH	FW	Manchester City	2011–12, 2013–14		
Joe Hart	2	ENG	GK	Manchester City	2011–12, 2013–14		
Aleksandar Kolarov	2	SRB	DF	Manchester City	2011–12, 2013–14		
Joleon Lescott	2	ENG	DF	Manchester City	2011–12, 2013–14		
Samir Nasri	2	FRA	MF	Manchester City	2011–12, 2013–14		
Pablo Zabaleta	2	ARG	DF	Manchester City	2011–12, 2013–14		
César Azpilicueta	2	ESP	DF	Chelsea	2014–15, 2016–17		
Gary Cahill	2	ENG	DF	Chelsea	2014–15, 2016–17		
Diego Costa	2	ESP	FW	Chelsea	2014–15, 2016–17		
Thibaut Courtois	2	BEL	GK	Chelsea	2014–15, 2016–17		
Cesc Fàbregas	2	ESP	MF	Chelsea	2014–15, 2016–17		
Eden Hazard	2	BEL	FW	Chelsea	2014–15, 2016–17		
Nemanja Matić	2	SRB	MF	Chelsea	2014–15, 2016–17		
Oscar	2	BRA	MF	Chelsea	2014–15, 2016–17		
Willian	2	BRA	FW	Chelsea	2014–15, 2016–17		
Kurt Zouma	2	FRA	DF	Chelsea	2014–15, 2016–17		
N'Golo Kanté	2	FRA	MF	Leicester City (1), Chelsea (1)	2015–16, 2016–17		
Danilo	2	BRA	DF	Manchester City	2017–18, 2018–19		
Fabian Delph	2	ENG	MF	Manchester City	2017–18, 2018–19		
Nicolás Otamendi	2	ARG	DF	Manchester City	2017–18, 2018–19		
Leroy Sané	2	GER	FW	Manchester City	2017–18, 2018–19		
Trent Alexander-Arnold	2	ENG	DF	Liverpool	2019–20, 2024–25		
Alisson	2	BRA	GK	Liverpool	2019–20, 2024–25		
Virgil van Dijk	2	NED	DF	Liverpool	2019–20, 2024–25		
Joe Gomez	2	ENG	DF	Liverpool	2019–20, 2024–25		
Curtis Jones	2	ENG	MF	Liverpool	2019–20, 2024–25		
Mohamed Salah	2	EGY	FW	Liverpool	2019–20, 2024–25		
Andy Robertson	2	SCO	DF	Liverpool	2019–20, 2024–25		
Zack Steffen	2	USA	GK	Manchester City	2020–21, 2021–22		
Manuel Akanji	2	SUI	DF	Manchester City	2022–23, 2023–24		
Julián Alvarez	2	ARG	FW	Manchester City	2022–23, 2023–24		
Sergio Gómez	2	ESP	MF	Manchester City	2022–23, 2023–24		
Erling Haaland	2	NOR	FW	Manchester City	2022–23, 2023–24		
Rico Lewis	2	ENG	DF	Manchester City	2022–23, 2023–24		
Stefan Ortega	2	GER	GK	Manchester City	2022–23, 2023–24		
Clayton Blackmore	1	WAL	MF	Manchester United	1992–93		
Dion Dublin	1	ENG	FW	Manchester United	1992–93		
Darren Ferguson	1	SCO	MF	Manchester United	1992–93		
Mike Phelan	1	ENG	MF	Manchester United	1992–93		
Mark Atkins	1	ENG	MF	Blackburn Rovers	1994–95		
Tim Flowers	1	ENG	GK	Blackburn Rovers	1994–95		
Tony Gale	1	ENG	DF	Blackburn Rovers	1994–95		
Colin Hendry	1	SCO	DF	Blackburn Rovers	1994–95		
Graeme Le Saux	1	ENG	DF	Blackburn Rovers	1994–95		
Mike Newell	1	ENG	FW	Blackburn Rovers	1994–95		
Ian Pearce	1	ENG	DF	Blackburn Rovers	1994–95		
Stuart Ripley	1	ENG	MF	Blackburn Rovers	1994–95		
Alan Shearer	1	ENG	FW	Blackburn Rovers	1994–95		
Tim Sherwood	1	ENG	MF	Blackburn Rovers	1994–95		
Robbie Slater	1	AUS	MF	Blackburn Rovers	1994–95		
Chris Sutton	1	ENG	FW	Blackburn Rovers	1994–95		
Paul Warhurst	1	ENG	DF	Blackburn Rovers	1994–95		
Jason Wilcox	1	ENG	MF	Blackburn Rovers	1994–95		
Jordi Cruyff	1	NED	MF	Manchester United	1996–97		
Karel Poborský	1	CZE	MF	Manchester United	1996–97		
Luís Boa Morte	1	POR	MF	Arsenal	1997–98		
Steve Bould	1	ENG	DF	Arsenal	1997–98		
Rémi Garde	1	FRA	DF	Arsenal	1997–98		
Stephen Hughes	1	ENG	MF	Arsenal	1997–98		
Alex Manninger	1	AUT	GK	Arsenal	1997–98		
Marc Overmars	1	NED	MF	Arsenal	1997–98		
Emmanuel Petit	1	FRA	MF	Arsenal	1997–98		
David Platt	1	ENG	MF	Arsenal	1997–98		
Nigel Winterburn	1	ENG	DF	Arsenal	1997–98		
Christopher Wreh	1	LBR	FW	Arsenal	1997–98		
Ian Wright	1	ENG	FW	Arsenal	1997–98		
Jesper Blomqvist	1	SWE	FW	Manchester United	1998–99		
Mark Bosnich	1	AUS	GK	Manchester United	1999–2000		
Luke Chadwick	1	ENG	MF	Manchester United	2000–01		
Ronnie Wallwork	1	ENG	DF	Manchester United	2000–01		
Giovanni van Bronckhorst	1	NED	DF	Arsenal	2001–02		
Oleh Luzhnyi	1	UKR	DF	Arsenal	2001–02		
Igors Stepanovs	1	LVA	DF	Arsenal	2001–02		
Stuart Taylor	1	ENG	GK	Arsenal	2001–02		
Matthew Upson	1	ENG	DF	Arsenal	2001–02		
Richard Wright	1	ENG	GK	Arsenal	2001–02		
Laurent Blanc	1	FRA	DF	Manchester United	2002–03		
Roy Carroll	1	NIR	GK	Manchester United	2002–03		
Quinton Fortune	1	RSA	MF	Manchester United	2002–03		
Diego Forlán	1	URU	FW	Manchester United	2002–03		
Ruud van Nistelrooy	1	NED	FW	Manchester United	2002–03		
Juan Sebastián Verón	1	ARG	MF	Manchester United	2002–03		
Jérémie Aliadière	1	FRA	FW	Arsenal	2003–04		
Pascal Cygan	1	FRA	DF	Arsenal	2003–04		
Jens Lehmann	1	GER	GK	Arsenal	2003–04		
José Antonio Reyes	1	ESP	MF	Arsenal	2003–04		
Gilberto Silva	1	BRA	MF	Arsenal	2003–04		
Wayne Bridge	1	ENG	DF	Chelsea	2004–05		
Jiří Jarošík	1	CZE	DF	Chelsea	2004–05		
Glen Johnson	1	ENG	DF	Chelsea	2004–05		
Mateja Kežman	1	SRB	FW	Chelsea	2004–05		
Alexey Smertin	1	RUS	MF	Chelsea	2004–05		
Tiago	1	POR	MF	Chelsea	2004–05		
Hernán Crespo	1	ARG	FW	Chelsea	2005–06		
Asier del Horno	1	ESP	DF	Chelsea	2005–06		
Shaun Wright-Phillips	1	ENG	MF	Chelsea	2005–06		
Gabriel Heinze	1	ARG	DF	Manchester United	2006–07		
Henrik Larsson	1	SWE	FW	Manchester United	2006–07		
Kieran Richardson	1	ENG	DF	Manchester United	2006–07		
Alan Smith	1	ENG	MF	Manchester United	2006–07		
Owen Hargreaves	1	ENG	MF	Manchester United	2007–08		
Gerard Piqué	1	ESP	DF	Manchester United	2007–08		
Alex	1	BRA	DF	Chelsea	2009–10		
Michael Ballack	1	GER	MF	Chelsea	2009–10		
Juliano Belletti	1	BRA	DF	Chelsea	2009–10		
Deco	1	POR	MF	Chelsea	2009–10		
Salomon Kalou	1	CIV	MF	Chelsea	2009–10		
Florent Malouda	1	FRA	MF	Chelsea	2009–10		
Daniel Sturridge	1	ENG	FW	Chelsea	2009–10		
Yuri Zhirkov	1	RUS	MF	Chelsea	2009–10		
Fabio	1	BRA	DF	Manchester United	2010–11		
Darron Gibson	1	IRL	MF	Manchester United	2010–11		
Michael Owen	1	ENG	FW	Manchester United	2010–11		
Mario Balotelli	1	ITA	FW	Manchester City	2011–12		
Gareth Barry	1	ENG	MF	Manchester City	2011–12		
Adam Johnson	1	ENG	MF	Manchester City	2011–12		
Nigel de Jong	1	NED	MF	Manchester City	2011–12		
Micah Richards	1	ENG	DF	Manchester City	2011–12		
Stefan Savić	1	MNE	DF	Manchester City	2011–12		
Alexander Büttner	1	NED	DF	Manchester United	2012–13		
Tom Cleverley	1	ENG	MF	Manchester United	2012–13		
David de Gea	1	ESP	GK	Manchester United	2012–13		
Phil Jones	1	ENG	DF	Manchester United	2012–13		
Shinji Kagawa	1	JPN	MF	Manchester United	2012–13		
Anders Lindegaard	1	DEN	GK	Manchester United	2012–13		
Robin van Persie	1	NED	FW	Manchester United	2012–13		
Danny Welbeck	1	ENG	FW	Manchester United	2012–13		
Ashley Young	1	ENG	DF	Manchester United	2012–13		
Martín Demichelis	1	ARG	DF	Manchester City	2013–14		
Javi García	1	ESP	MF	Manchester City	2013–14		
Stevan Jovetić	1	MNE	FW	Manchester City	2013–14		
Matija Nastasić	1	SRB	DF	Manchester City	2013–14		
Jesús Navas	1	ESP	DF	Manchester City	2013–14		
Álvaro Negredo	1	ESP	FW	Manchester City	2013–14		
Costel Pantilimon	1	ROU	GK	Manchester City	2013–14		
Jack Rodwell	1	ENG	MF	Manchester City	2013–14		
Juan Cuadrado	1	COL	MF	Chelsea	2014–15		
Filipe Luís	1	BRA	DF	Chelsea	2014–15		
Ramires	1	BRA	MF	Chelsea	2014–15		
Loïc Rémy	1	FRA	FW	Chelsea	2014–15		
André Schürrle	1	GER	MF	Chelsea	2014–15		
Marc Albrighton	1	ENG	MF	Leicester City	2015–16		
Daniel Amartey	1	GHA	DF	Leicester City	2015–16		
Ritchie De Laet	1	BEL	DF	Leicester City	2015–16		
Danny Drinkwater	1	ENG	MF	Leicester City	2015–16		
Nathan Dyer	1	ENG	MF	Leicester City	2015–16		
Christian Fuchs	1	AUT	DF	Leicester City	2015–16		
Demarai Gray	1	JAM	FW	Leicester City	2015–16		
Gökhan Inler	1	SUI	MF	Leicester City	2015–16		
Andy King	1	WAL	MF	Leicester City	2015–16		
Wes Morgan	1	JAM	DF	Leicester City	2015–16		
Shinji Okazaki	1	JPN	FW	Leicester City	2015–16		
Jeffrey Schlupp	1	GHA	MF	Leicester City	2015–16		
Kasper Schmeichel	1	DEN	GK	Leicester City	2015–16		
Danny Simpson	1	ENG	DF	Leicester City	2015–16		
Leonardo Ulloa	1	ARG	FW	Leicester City	2015–16		
Jamie Vardy	1	ENG	FW	Leicester City	2015–16		
Marcos Alonso	1	ESP	DF	Chelsea	2016–17		
Michy Batshuayi	1	BEL	FW	Chelsea	2016–17		
Asmir Begović	1	BIH	GK	Chelsea	2016–17		
Nathaniel Chalobah	1	ENG	MF	Chelsea	2016–17		
David Luiz	1	BRA	DF	Chelsea	2016–17		
Ruben Loftus-Cheek	1	ENG	MF	Chelsea	2016–17		
Victor Moses	1	NGA	MF	Chelsea	2016–17		
Pedro	1	ESP	FW	Chelsea	2016–17		
Claudio Bravo	1	CHI	GK	Manchester City	2017–18		
Brahim Díaz	1	MAR	MF	Manchester City	2017–18		
Eliaquim Mangala	1	FRA	DF	Manchester City	2017–18		
Adrián	1	ESP	GK	Liverpool	2019–20		
Fabinho	1	BRA	MF	Liverpool	2019–20		
Roberto Firmino	1	BRA	FW	Liverpool	2019–20		
Jordan Henderson	1	ENG	MF	Liverpool	2019–20		
Naby Keïta	1	GUI	MF	Liverpool	2019–20		
Adam Lallana	1	ENG	MF	Liverpool	2019–20		
Dejan Lovren	1	CRO	DF	Liverpool	2019–20		
Sadio Mané	1	SEN	FW	Liverpool	2019–20		
Joël Matip	1	CMR	DF	Liverpool	2019–20		
Takumi Minamino	1	JPN	MF	Liverpool	2019–20		
Divock Origi	1	BEL	FW	Liverpool	2019–20		
Alex Oxlade-Chamberlain	1	ENG	MF	Liverpool	2019–20		
Xherdan Shaqiri	1	SUI	MF	Liverpool	2019–20		
Georginio Wijnaldum	1	NED	MF	Liverpool	2019–20		
Neco Williams	1	WAL	DF	Liverpool	2019–20		
Eric García	1	ESP	DF	Manchester City	2020–21		
Ferran Torres	1	ESP	FW	Manchester City	2020–21		
Cole Palmer	1	ENG	MF	Manchester City	2022–23		
Kalvin Phillips	1	ENG	MF	Manchester City	2022–23		
Oscar Bobb	1	NOR	MF	Manchester City	2023–24		
Jérémy Doku	1	BEL	FW	Manchester City	2023–24		
Joško Gvardiol	1	CRO	DF	Manchester City	2023–24		
Mateo Kovačić	1	CRO	MF	Manchester City	2023–24		
Matheus Nunes	1	POR	MF	Manchester City	2023–24		
Conor Bradley	1	NIR	DF	Liverpool	2024–25		
Federico Chiesa	1	ITA	FW	Liverpool	2024–25		
Luis Díaz	1	COL	FW	Liverpool	2024–25		
Diogo Jota	1	POR	FW	Liverpool	2024–25		
Harvey Elliott	1	ENG	MF	Liverpool	2024–25		
Wataru Endo	1	JPN	MF	Liverpool	2024–25		
Cody Gakpo	1	NED	FW	Liverpool	2024–25		
Ryan Gravenberch	1	NED	MF	Liverpool	2024–25		
Caoimhín Kelleher	1	IRL	GK	Liverpool	2024–25		
Ibrahima Konaté	1	FRA	DF	Liverpool	2024–25		
Alexis Mac Allister	1	ARG	MF	Liverpool	2024–25		
Darwin Núñez	1	URU	FW	Liverpool	2024–25		
Jarell Quansah	1	ENG	DF	Liverpool	2024–25		
Dominik Szoboszlai	1	HUN	MF	Liverpool	2024–25		
Kostas Tsimikas	1	GRE	DF	Liverpool	2024–25		
Kepa Arrizabalaga	1	ESP	GK	Arsenal	2025–26		
Riccardo Calafiori	1	ITA	DF	Arsenal	2025–26		
Max Dowman	1	ENG	MF	Arsenal	2025–26	(Note: Youngest medal winner aged 16 years, 144 days.)	
Eberechi Eze	1	ENG	MF	Arsenal	2025–26		
Gabriel	1	BRA	DF	Arsenal	2025–26		
Viktor Gyökeres	1	SWE	FW	Arsenal	2025–26		
Kai Havertz	1	GER	FW	Arsenal	2025–26		
Piero Hincapié	1	ECU	DF	Arsenal	2025–26		
Myles Lewis-Skelly	1	ENG	DF	Arsenal	2025–26		
Noni Madueke	1	ENG	FW	Arsenal	2025–26		
Gabriel Martinelli	1	BRA	FW	Arsenal	2025–26		
Mikel Merino	1	ESP	MF	Arsenal	2025–26		
Cristhian Mosquera	1	ESP	DF	Arsenal	2025–26		
Christian Nørgaard	1	DEN	MF	Arsenal	2025–26		
Ethan Nwaneri	1	ENG	MF	Arsenal	2025–26		
Martin Ødegaard	1	NOR	MF	Arsenal	2025–26		
David Raya	1	ESP	GK	Arsenal	2025–26		
Declan Rice	1	ENG	MF	Arsenal	2025–26		
Bukayo Saka	1	ENG	FW	Arsenal	2025–26		
William Saliba	1	FRA	DF	Arsenal	2025–26		
Jurriën Timber	1	NED	DF	Arsenal	2025–26		
Leandro Trossard	1	BEL	FW	Arsenal	2025–26		
Ben White	1	ENG	DF	Arsenal	2025–26		
Martín Zubimendi	1	ESP	MF	Arsenal	2025–26		

== By nationality ==
Nationality	Players	Wins	% of Players	% of Wins
England	105	220	30.52	32.21
France	28	56	8.14	8.20
Brazil	21	44	6.10	6.44
Spain	24	38	6.98	5.56
Netherlands	18	31	5.23	4.54
Portugal	12	31	3.49	4.54
Republic of Ireland	6	23	1.74	3.37
Argentina	11	20	3.20	2.93
Belgium	9	19	2.62	2.78
Wales	5	18	1.45	2.64
Germany	8	16	2.33	2.34
Norway	6	16	1.74	2.34
Serbia	6	14	1.74	2.05
Scotland	5	13	1.45	1.90
Ivory Coast	4	10	1.16	1.46
Denmark	4	8	1.16	1.17
Czech Republic	3	6	0.87	0.88
Sweden	4	5	1.16	0.73
Cameroon	3	5	0.87	0.73
Nigeria	3	5	0.87	0.73
Northern Ireland	3	5	0.87	0.73
Ukraine	2	5	0.58	0.73
Algeria	1	5	0.29	0.73
Japan	4	4	1.16	0.59
Ghana	3	4	0.87	0.59
Russia	3	4	0.87	0.59
Switzerland	3	4	0.87	0.59
South Korea	1	4	0.29	0.59
Croatia	3	3	0.87	0.44
Italy	3	3	0.87	0.44
Bosnia and Herzegovina	2	3	0.58	0.44
Ecuador	2	3	0.58	0.44
Poland	1	3	0.29	0.44
Trinidad and Tobago	1	3	0.29	0.44
Australia	2	2	0.58	0.29
Austria	2	2	0.58	0.29
Colombia	2	2	0.58	0.29
Jamaica	2	2	0.58	0.29
Montenegro	2	2	0.58	0.29
Uruguay	2	2	0.58	0.29
Bulgaria	1	2	0.29	0.29
Egypt	1	2	0.29	0.29
Iceland	1	2	0.29	0.29
Mexico	1	2	0.29	0.29
United States	1	2	0.29	0.29
Chile	1	1	0.29	0.15
Greece	1	1	0.29	0.15
Guinea	1	1	0.29	0.15
Hungary	1	1	0.29	0.15
Latvia	1	1	0.29	0.15
Liberia	1	1	0.29	0.15
Morocco	1	1	0.29	0.15
Romania	1	1	0.29	0.15
Senegal	1	1	0.29	0.15
South Africa	1	1	0.29	0.15
Total	344	683	100.00%	100.00%

== By club ==
Club	Players	Wins
Manchester United	86	247
Manchester City	70	170
Chelsea	60	99
Arsenal	67	88
Liverpool	38	45
Leicester City	19	19
Blackburn Rovers	15	15
