= Bank of Dalian =

Bank based in Dalian, Liaoning, China

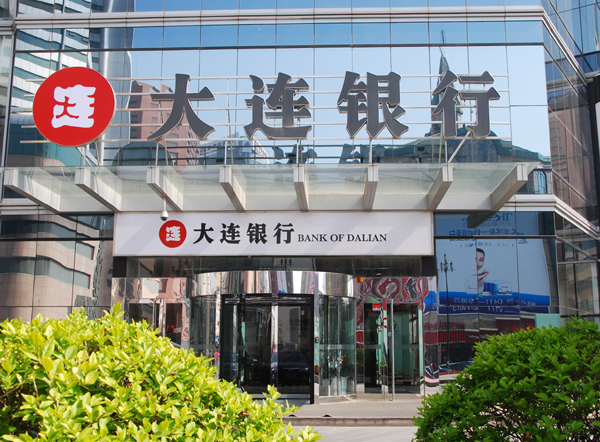
- Bank of Dalian's headquarters in Qingniwaqiao
- Company type: joint-stock company
- Industry: Financial services
- Founded: 19 March 1998
- Headquarters: Dalian, China
- Revenue: ▼CN¥5.564 billion (2015)
- Operating income: ▼CN¥464 million (2015)
- Net income: ▼CN¥129 million (2015)
- Total assets: ▼CN¥244.359 billion (2015)
- Total equity: ▲CN¥18.472 billion (2015)
- Owner: China Orient Asset Management (39.70%); Dalian Municipal Bureau of Finance (11.07%); others (49.23%)
- Capital ratio: ▲10.50% (CET1)
- Footnotes / references in separate financial statements; in Chinese accounting standards

Bank of Dalian Co., Ltd.
- Simplified Chinese: 大连银行股份有限公司
- Traditional Chinese: 大連銀行股份有限公司
Transcriptions

Bank of Dalian
- Simplified Chinese: 大连银行
- Traditional Chinese: 大連銀行
Transcriptions

Bank of Dalian Co., Ltd. is a Chinese urban commercial bank, with its headquarters in Dalian, Liaoning Province, China. On March 28, 1998, it was established as Dalian City Commercial Bank and opened its branches only in Dalian. In 2007, it changed its name to Bank of Dalian and has since opened branches in Tianjin, Beijing, Shanghai and five other cities in China.

In 2015, China Orient Asset Management subscribed the new shares of the bank, as well as bought some assets from it. The assets itself were originally a collateral. In 2016 the bank signed a strategic agreement with sister company Dongxing Securities.
