= China Orient Asset Management =

Strategic state-owned investment and asset-management bank

China Orient Asset Management 中国东方资产管理股份有限公司
- COAMC logo

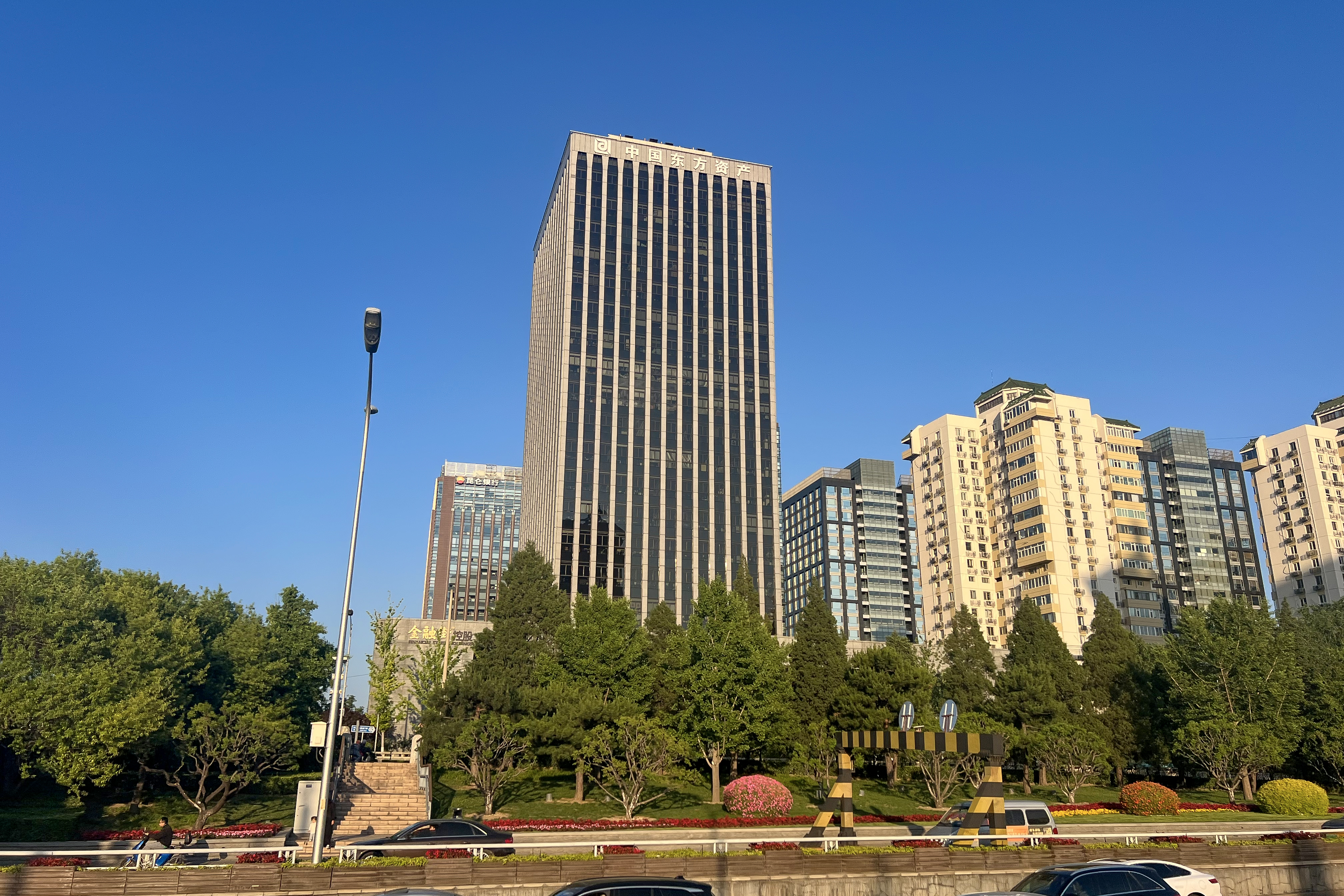
- COAMC Building
- Formerly: China Orient Asset Management Corporation
- Company type: state-owned enterprise
- Industry: Financial services
- Founded: 1999; 27 years ago
- Headquarters: Beijing, China
- Area served: China
- Services: merchant bank; asset management; Credit rating
- Revenue: ▲CN¥12.7 billion (2012)
- Operating income: ▲CN¥4.0 billion (2012)
- Net income: ▲CN¥12.35 billion (2017)
- Total assets: ▲CN¥979.22 billion (2017)
- Total equity: ▲CN¥18.4 billion (2012)
- Owner: Ministry of Finance of China; National Social Security Fund
- Parent: Ministry of Finance of China
- Website: coamc.com.cn
- Footnotes / references in a consolidated basis, commercial sector only

China Orient Asset Management Co., Ltd.
- Simplified Chinese: 中国东方资产管理股份有限公司
- Traditional Chinese: 中國東方資產管理股份有限公司
Transcriptions
Standard Mandarin
- Hanyu Pinyin: Zhōngguó Dōngfāng zīchǎn guǎnlǐ gǔfèn yǒuxiàn gōngsī

Alternative Chinese name
- Simplified Chinese: 东方资产
- Traditional Chinese: 東方資產
- Literal meaning: Orient Asset
Transcriptions
Standard Mandarin
- Hanyu Pinyin: Dōngfāng zīchǎn

China Orient Asset Management Co., Ltd. is a Chinese distressed asset management company headquartered in Beijing. The company is an asset management company and a merchant bank originated as a bad bank for the Bank of China. The bank received shares from debt-to-equity swap of non-performing loans. It is a state-owned enterprise.

The corporation runs in two major business units since 2006, one for general commercial activities (Chinese: 商业化业务), one for the management of the shares that converted from non-performing loans (Chinese: 政策性不良资产处置业务), which was classified as assets under management.

In 2016 the corporation was re-incorporated as a "company limited by shares" (Chinese: 股份有限公司): China Orient Asset Management Co., Ltd. (Chinese: 中国东方资产管理股份有限公司) from China Orient Asset Management Corporation (COAMC, Chinese: 中国东方资产管理公司). The National Social Security Fund and the Ministry of Finance were the shareholders. According to the company's news press, as of 30 June 2016 its net assets stood at CN¥55.6 billion. The former non-performing assets under management were converted to share capital, raising from CN¥10 billion to CN¥55.363 billion.

== History ==
Founded as a bad bank of Bank of China, Orient Asset also received Bank of China's asset management subsidiary Bangxin Asset Management in 2000, which itself was incorporated in 1994 as a subsidiary of BoC Shenzhen branch.

In 2015 the group expanded as a full service financial conglomerate by acquiring the Bank of Dalian.

== Subsidiaries ==
- Doho Data Consulting Company
- Dong Yin Development (Holdings) (100%)
  - Wise Leader Assets (100%)
  - China Orient Asset Management (International) Holding (Chinese: 中国东方资产管理(国际)控股有限公司, 100%)
    - China Orient Ruichen Capital (Chinese: 东方瑞宸基金管理有限公司, 40%)
    - China Orient Summit Capital International (Chinese: 东方藏山资产管理有限公司, 40%)
      - China Orient Summit Capital Special Situations Fund (100%)
- Charming Light Investments (SPV for dim sum bond SEHK: 85723)
- Bangxin Asset Management (100%)
- Bank of Dalian (39.70%)
- China United Insurance Holding (51.01%)
- Dongxing Securities (58.09%, SSE: 601198)
- Chinese: 东方金诚 (a Credit rating service provider)

== Portfolio companies ==
- Baiyin Nonferrous (0.63%)
- Dongbei Special Steel (16.6740%)
- Meishan Iron and Steel (7.02%)
- Shandong Jining Ruyi Woolen Textile (12.24%, SZSE: 002193)
- Shanghai Zendai Property (via COS Greater China Special Situations Fund for 18.17%, SEHK: 755)
- Tianjin Pipe Corporation (3.03%)
- Xishan Coal Electricity Group (5.67%)

=== Former portfolio companies ===
- China Kejian Co., Ltd. (SZSE: 000035)
- Dongfeng Motor Group (2001–2004)
- Rising Nonferrous Metals (SSE: 600259)
