= Kejian Group =

Chinese telecommunications company

- Industry: Telecommunications; Internet; Computer software
- Founded: 1984
- Defunct: 2013
- Fate: Bankrupt
- Headquarters: Shenzhen, China
- Area served: China
- Products: Mobile phones Smartphones; Mobile computers Networks
- Subsidiaries: China Tianying, China Kejian Co., Ltd.

Shenzhen Kejian Group Co., Ltd. (Chinese: 深圳科健集团有限公司), better known as Kejian (Chinese: 科健), was a Chinese telecommunications company.

During the 2002–03 FA Premier League season, the company sponsored Everton F.C.

Kejian was responsible for the club's signing of Chinese international players Li Tie and Li Weifeng.

The company went bankrupt in 2013. The shares of the listed subsidiary of Kejian: China Kejian Co., Ltd. (Chinese: 中国科健股份有限公司, SZSE: 000035) were distributed to creditor such as China Orient Asset Management and China Cinda Asset Management in the same year. The former subsidiary is now known as China Tianying after a reverse IPO in 2013.
