= Dongxing Securities =

China-based investment firm

- Company type: Public
- Traded as: SSE: 601198
- Industry: Financial services
- Founded: 2008
- Founder: China Orient Asset Management
- Headquarters: Beijing, China
- Area served: Mainland China, Hong Kong
- Services: Investment banking; Brokerage; Asset management
- Revenue: ▲CN¥5.357 billion (2015)
- Operating income: ▲CN¥2.529 billion (2015)
- Net income: ▲CN¥2.044 billion (2015)
- Total assets: ▲CN¥73.181 billion (2015)
- Total equity: ▲CN¥13.585 billion (2015)
- Owner: China Orient Asset Management (58.09%)
- Subsidiaries: Dongxing Securities HK; Dongxing Voyage
- Footnotes / references in consolidated financial statement; in Chinese accounting standards

Dongxing Securities Co., Ltd.
- Simplified Chinese: 东兴证券股份有限公司
- Traditional Chinese: 東興證券股份有限公司
Transcriptions

Dongxing Securities
- Simplified Chinese: 东兴证券
- Traditional Chinese: 東興證券
Transcriptions

Dongxing Securities Co., Ltd. is a Chinese investment bank and brokerage firm. The firm was a constituent of SSE 50 Index (since 28 November 2016) and CSI 100 Index.

In 2008 China Orient Asset Management spin-off part of their business to form Dongxing Securities. In 2015 Dongxing Securities became a public traded company in Shanghai Stock Exchange.

In 2012, Dongxing Securities submitted its application for an Initial Public Offering (IPO) to the China Securities Regulatory Commission (CSRC). The application was approved in May of the same year, but the company was unable to go public due to the suspension of new stock issuances.

On February 26, 2015, Dongxing Securities was officially listed on the Shanghai Stock Exchange, becoming the first "asset management-based" securities firm to go public on the A-share market.

Dongxing Securities was rated as Class A, maintaining the same rating as in 2020.
