= 2002–03 FA Premier League =

Football season in England

FA Premier League
- Season: 2002–03
- Dates: 17 August 2002 – 11 May 2003
- Champions: Manchester United; 8th Premier League title 15th English title
- Relegated: West Ham United; West Bromwich Albion; Sunderland
- Champions League: Manchester United; Arsenal; Newcastle United; Chelsea
- UEFA Cup: Southampton; Blackburn Rovers; Liverpool; Manchester City (through UEFA Respect Fair Play ranking)
- Matches: 380
- Goals: 1,000 (2.63 per match)
- Top goalscorer: Ruud van Nistelrooy (25 goals)
- Best goalkeeper: Brad Friedel (15 clean sheets)
- Biggest home win: Chelsea 5–0 Manchester City (22 March 2003); Arsenal 6–1 Southampton (7 May 2003)
- Biggest away win: West Bromwich Albion 0–6 Liverpool (26 April 2003)
- Highest scoring: Manchester United 5–3 Newcastle United (23 November 2002); Newcastle United 2–6 Manchester United (12 April 2003)
- Longest winning run: 7 games Liverpool
- Longest unbeaten run: 18 games Manchester United
- Longest winless run: 20 games Sunderland
- Longest losing run: 15 games Sunderland
- Highest attendance: 67,721; Manchester United 4–1 Charlton Athletic (3 May 2003)
- Lowest attendance: 14,017; Fulham 0–4 Blackburn Rovers (7 April 2003)
- Total attendance: 13,476,455
- Average attendance: 35,464

The 2002–03 FA Premier League (known as the FA Barclaycard Premiership for sponsorship reasons) was the 11th season of the Premier League, the top division in English football. The first matches were played on 17 August 2002 and the last were played on 11 May 2003.

Manchester United ended the campaign as champions for the eighth time in eleven years – an achievement made all the more remarkable by the fact that defending champions Arsenal had been in the lead by eight points on 2 March. After defeating Birmingham at the start of the season, Arsenal equalled a top-flight record of fourteen straight wins but failed to extend it in their next game at West Ham United, being held to a 2–2 draw. They remained unbeaten for 30 Premier League games, 23 of which were played away, until late October, and scored in a record 55 consecutive league games, beating the previous record of 47 set by Chesterfield during the 1930–31 Third Division North season. This run ended at Old Trafford on 7 December 2002, when Manchester United won 2–0. Arsenal then threw away a priceless lead against Bolton Wanderers and finally surrendered the title with a 3–2 home defeat to Leeds United in one of their last games of the season, a result that also saved Leeds from relegation. Newcastle United and Chelsea were the remaining Champions League qualifiers, at the expense of Liverpool who had to settle for the UEFA Cup; they would be joined in Europe by Blackburn Rovers for a second successive season, along with Southampton who were back in Europe for the first time since 1984.

At the bottom end of the table, West Ham United, West Bromwich Albion and Sunderland were relegated to the Football League First Division; West Ham's 42 points from a 38-game season was a record for a relegated team. Promoted to replace them were 2002–03 Football League First Division champions Portsmouth, runners-up Leicester City, and play-off winner Wolverhampton Wanderers.

== Teams ==
Twenty teams competed in the league – the top seventeen teams from the previous season and the three teams promoted from the First Division. The promoted teams were Manchester City (immediately returning after a season's absence), West Bromwich Albion, and Birmingham City (both teams returning to the top flight after a sixteen-year absence). This was also both West Bromwich Albion and Birmingham City's first season in the Premier League. They replaced Ipswich Town (relegated to the First Division after two seasons in the top flight), Derby County, and Leicester City (both teams relegated after a six-year presence).

=== Stadiums and locations ===
Locations of the 2002–03 Premier League teams
Greater London Premier League football clubs
West Midlands Premier League football clubs

Team	Location	Stadium	Capacity
Arsenal	London (Highbury)	Arsenal Stadium	38,419
Aston Villa	Birmingham (Aston)	Villa Park	42,573
Birmingham City	Birmingham (Bordesley)	St Andrew's	30,009
Blackburn Rovers	Blackburn	Ewood Park	31,367
Bolton Wanderers	Bolton	Reebok Stadium	28,723
Charlton Athletic	London (Charlton)	The Valley	27,111
Chelsea	London (Fulham)	Stamford Bridge	42,055
Everton	Liverpool (Walton)	Goodison Park	40,569
Fulham	London (Shepherd's Bush)	Loftus Road (Note: Fulham temporarily relocated to Loftus Road (home stadium of Queens Park Rangers) after Craven Cottage was in need of a refurbishment.)	19,148
Leeds United	Leeds	Elland Road	40,242
Liverpool	Liverpool (Anfield)	Anfield	45,522
Manchester City	Manchester (Moss Side)	Maine Road (Note: This was Manchester City's last season at Maine Road as they were scheduled to relocate to the 48,000 seater City of Manchester Stadium.)	35,150
Manchester United	Manchester (Old Trafford)	Old Trafford	68,174
Middlesbrough	Middlesbrough	Riverside Stadium	35,049
Newcastle United	Newcastle upon Tyne	St James' Park	52,387
Southampton	Southampton	St Mary's Stadium	32,689
Sunderland	Sunderland	Stadium of Light	49,000
Tottenham Hotspur	London (Tottenham)	White Hart Lane	36,240
West Bromwich Albion	West Bromwich	The Hawthorns	28,003
West Ham United	London (Upton Park)	Boleyn Ground	35,647

=== Personnel and kits ===
Team	Manager	Captain	Kit manufacturer	Shirt sponsor
Arsenal	(France) Arsène Wenger	(France) Patrick Vieira	Nike	O2
Aston Villa	(England) Graham Taylor	(Republic of Ireland) Steve Staunton	Diadora	Rover Company
Birmingham City	(England) Steve Bruce	(Republic of Ireland) Jeff Kenna	Le Coq Sportif	Phones4U
Blackburn Rovers	(Scotland) Graeme Souness	(England) Garry Flitcroft	Kappa	AMD Processors
Bolton Wanderers	(England) Sam Allardyce	(Iceland) Guðni Bergsson	Reebok	Reebok
Charlton Athletic	(England) Alan Curbishley	(England) Graham Stuart	Le Coq Sportif	All Sport
Chelsea	(Italy) Claudio Ranieri	(France) Marcel Desailly	Umbro	Fly Emirates
Everton	(Scotland) David Moyes	(Scotland) David Weir	Puma	Kejian
Fulham	(Wales) Chris Coleman	(Wales) Andy Melville	Adidas	Betfair
Leeds United	(England) Peter Reid	(Scotland) Dominic Matteo	Nike	Strongbow
Liverpool	(France) Gérard Houllier	(Finland) Sami Hyypiä	Reebok	Carlsberg
Manchester City	(England) Kevin Keegan	(Algeria) Ali Benarbia	Le Coq Sportif	First Advice
Manchester United	(Scotland) Sir Alex Ferguson	(Republic of Ireland) Roy Keane	Nike	Vodafone
Middlesbrough	(England) Steve McClaren	(England) Gareth Southgate	Erreà	Dial-a-Phone
Newcastle United	(England) Sir Bobby Robson	(England) Alan Shearer	Adidas	NTL
Southampton	(Scotland) Gordon Strachan	(England) Jason Dodd	Saints	Friends Provident
Sunderland	(Republic of Ireland) Mick McCarthy	(England) Michael Gray	Nike	Reg Vardy
Tottenham Hotspur	(England) Glenn Hoddle	(England) Teddy Sheringham	Kappa	Thomson
West Bromwich Albion	(England) Gary Megson	(England) Sean Gregan	The Baggies (by club)	West Bromwich Building Society
West Ham United	(England) Trevor Brooking (caretaker)	(England) Joe Cole	Fila	Dr. Martens

=== Managerial changes ===
Team	Outgoing manager	Manner of departure	Date of vacancy	Position in table	Incoming manager	Date of appointment
Leeds United	(Republic of Ireland) David O'Leary	Sacked	27 June 2002	Pre-season	(England) Terry Venables	8 July 2002
Sunderland	(England) Peter Reid	Sacked	7 October 2002	17th	(England) Howard Wilkinson	10 October 2002
Sunderland	(England) Howard Wilkinson	Sacked	10 March 2003	20th	(Republic of Ireland) Mick McCarthy	12 March 2003
Leeds United	(England) Terry Venables	Sacked	21 March 2003	15th	(England) Peter Reid	21 March 2003
Fulham	(France) Jean Tigana	Sacked	17 April 2003	15th	(Wales) Chris Coleman (caretaker)	17 April 2003
West Ham United	(England) Glenn Roeder	Illness	22 April 2003	18th	(England) Trevor Brooking (caretaker)	25 April 2003

== League table ==
Pos	Team	Pld	W	D	L	GF	GA	GD	Pts	Qualification or relegation
1	Manchester United (C)	38	25	8	5	74	34	+40	83	Qualification for the Champions League group stage
2	Arsenal	38	23	9	6	85	42	+43	78	Qualification for the Champions League group stage
3	Newcastle United	38	21	6	11	63	48	+15	69	Qualification for the Champions League third qualifying round
4	Chelsea	38	19	10	9	68	38	+30	67	Qualification for the Champions League third qualifying round
5	Liverpool	38	18	10	10	61	41	+20	64	Qualification for the UEFA Cup first round (Note: Since Liverpool qualified for the UEFA Cup via the league, their place in the UEFA Cup as League Cup winners reverted to the league and was awarded to Blackburn Rovers as the highest-placed team not already qualified for European competitions.)
6	Blackburn Rovers	38	16	12	10	52	43	+9	60	Qualification for the UEFA Cup first round
7	Everton	38	17	8	13	48	49	−1	59	
8	Southampton	38	13	13	12	43	46	−3	52	Qualification for the UEFA Cup first round (Note: Since Arsenal qualified for the Champions League, their place in the UEFA Cup as FA Cup winners went to Southampton, who were the FA Cup runners-up.)
9	Manchester City	38	15	6	17	47	54	−7	51	Qualification for the UEFA Cup qualifying round (Note: Manchester City qualified as the highest-ranked team not already qualified for European competitions of Premiership Fair Play League by The Football Association, the top association among UEFA Fair Play ranking winners.)
10	Tottenham Hotspur	38	14	8	16	51	62	−11	50	
11	Middlesbrough	38	13	10	15	48	44	+4	49	
12	Charlton Athletic	38	14	7	17	45	56	−11	49	
13	Birmingham City	38	13	9	16	41	49	−8	48	
14	Fulham	38	13	9	16	41	50	−9	48	
15	Leeds United	38	14	5	19	58	57	+1	47	
16	Aston Villa	38	12	9	17	42	47	−5	45	
17	Bolton Wanderers	38	10	14	14	41	51	−10	44	
18	West Ham United (R)	38	10	12	16	42	59	−17	42	Relegation to Football League First Division
19	West Bromwich Albion (R)	38	6	8	24	29	65	−36	26	Relegation to Football League First Division
20	Sunderland (R)	38	4	7	27	21	65	−44	19	Relegation to Football League First Division

Source: Premier League
Rules for classification: 1) points; 2) goal difference; 3) number of goals scored.
(C) Champions; (R) Relegated

== Results ==
Home \ Away	ARS	AVL	BIR	BLB	BOL	CHA	CHE	EVE	FUL	LEE	LIV	MCI	MUN	MID	NEW	SOU	SUN	TOT	WBA	WHU
Arsenal	—	3–1	2–0	1–2	2–1	2–0	3–2	2–1	2–1	2–3	1–1	2–1	2–2	2–0	1–0	6–1	3–1	3–0	5–2	3–1
Aston Villa	1–1	—	0–2	3–0	2–0	2–0	2–1	3–2	3–1	0–0	0–1	1–0	0–1	1–0	0–1	0–1	1–0	0–1	2–1	4–1
Birmingham City	0–4	3–0	—	0–1	3–1	1–1	1–3	1–1	0–0	2–1	2–1	0–2	0–1	3–0	0–2	3–2	2–0	1–1	1–0	2–2
Blackburn Rovers	2–0	0–0	1–1	—	0–0	1–0	2–3	0–1	2–1	1–0	2–2	1–0	1–0	1–0	5–2	1–0	0–0	1–2	1–1	2–2
Bolton Wanderers	2–2	1–0	4–2	1–1	—	1–2	1–1	1–2	0–0	0–3	2–3	2–0	1–1	2–1	4–3	1–1	1–1	1–0	1–1	1–0
Charlton Athletic	0–3	3–0	0–2	3–1	1–1	—	2–3	2–1	0–1	1–6	2–0	2–2	1–3	1–0	0–2	2–1	1–1	0–1	1–0	4–2
Chelsea	1–1	2–0	3–0	1–2	1–0	4–1	—	4–1	1–1	3–2	2–1	5–0	2–2	1–0	3–0	0–0	3–0	1–1	2–0	2–3
Everton	2–1	2–1	1–1	2–1	0–0	1–0	1–3	—	2–0	2–0	1–2	2–2	1–2	2–1	2–1	2–1	2–1	2–2	1–0	0–0
Fulham	0–1	2–1	0–1	0–4	4–1	1–0	0–0	2–0	—	1–0	3–2	0–1	1–1	1–0	2–1	2–2	1–0	3–2	3–0	0–1
Leeds United	1–4	3–1	2–0	2–3	2–4	1–2	2–0	0–1	2–0	—	0–1	3–0	1–0	2–3	0–3	1–1	0–1	2–2	0–0	1–0
Liverpool	2–2	1–1	2–2	1–1	2–0	2–1	1–0	0–0	2–0	3–1	—	1–2	1–2	1–1	2–2	3–0	0–0	2–1	2–0	2–0
Manchester City	1–5	3–1	1–0	2–2	2–0	0–1	0–3	3–1	4–1	2–1	0–3	—	3–1	0–0	1–0	0–1	3–0	2–3	1–2	0–1
Manchester United	2–0	1–1	2–0	3–1	0–1	4–1	2–1	3–0	3–0	2–1	4–0	1–1	—	1–0	5–3	2–1	2–1	1–0	1–0	3–0
Middlesbrough	0–2	2–5	1–0	1–0	2–0	1–1	1–1	1–1	2–2	2–2	1–0	3–1	3–1	—	1–0	2–2	3–0	5–1	3–0	2–2
Newcastle United	1–1	1–1	1–0	5–1	1–0	2–1	2–1	2–1	2–0	0–2	1–0	2–0	2–6	2–0	—	2–1	2–0	2–1	2–1	4–0
Southampton	3–2	2–2	2–0	1–1	0–0	0–0	1–1	1–0	4–2	3–2	0–1	2–0	0–2	0–0	1–1	—	2–1	1–0	1–0	1–1
Sunderland	0–4	1–0	0–1	0–0	0–2	1–3	1–2	0–1	0–3	1–2	2–1	0–3	1–1	1–3	0–1	0–1	—	2–0	1–2	0–1
Tottenham Hotspur	1–1	1–0	2–1	0–4	3–1	2–2	0–0	4–3	1–1	2–0	2–3	0–2	0–2	0–3	0–1	2–1	4–1	—	3–1	3–2
West Bromwich Albion	1–2	0–0	1–1	0–2	1–1	0–1	0–2	1–2	1–0	1–3	0–6	1–2	1–3	1–0	2–2	1–0	2–2	2–3	—	1–2
West Ham United	2–2	2–2	1–2	2–1	1–1	0–2	1–0	0–1	1–1	3–4	0–3	0–0	1–1	1–0	2–2	0–1	2–0	2–0	0–1	—

Source: FA Premier League
Legend: Blue = home team win; Yellow = draw; Red = away team win.

== Overall ==
- Most wins – Manchester United (25)
- Fewest wins – Sunderland (4)
- Most draws – Bolton Wanderers (14)
- Fewest draws – Leeds United (5)
- Most losses – Sunderland (27)
- Fewest losses – Manchester United (5)
- Most goals scored – Arsenal (85)
- Fewest goals scored – Sunderland (21)
- Most goals conceded – West Bromwich Albion and Sunderland (65)
- Fewest goals conceded – Manchester United (34)

== Season statistics ==
=== Scoring ===
- First goal of the season:
  (England) Michael Ricketts for Bolton Wanderers against Fulham (17 August 2002)
- Last goal of the season:
  (Australia) Mark Viduka for Leeds United against Aston Villa (11 May 2003)

=== Top scorers ===
Rank	Player	Club	Goals
1	(Netherlands) Ruud van Nistelrooy	Manchester United	25
2	(France) Thierry Henry	Arsenal	24
3	(England) James Beattie	Southampton	23
4	(Australia) Mark Viduka	Leeds United	20
5	(England) Michael Owen	Liverpool	19
6	(England) Alan Shearer	Newcastle United	17
7	(France) Nicolas Anelka	Manchester City	15
8	(Italy) Gianfranco Zola	Chelsea	14
8	(France) Robert Pires	Arsenal	14
8	(Australia) Harry Kewell	Leeds United	14
8	(England) Paul Scholes	Manchester United	14

=== Hat-tricks ===
Player	For	Against	Result	Date
(England) Michael Owen	Liverpool	Manchester City	3–0	28 September 2002
(England) James Beattie	Southampton	Fulham	4–2	27 October 2002
(Netherlands) Ruud van Nistelrooy	Manchester United	Newcastle United	5–3	23 November 2002
(Republic of Ireland) Robbie Keane	Tottenham Hotspur	Everton	4–3	12 January 2003
(France) Thierry Henry	Arsenal	West Ham United	3–1	27 January 2003
(Netherlands) Ruud van Nistelrooy	Manchester United	Fulham	3–0	22 March 2003
(Australia) Mark Viduka	Leeds United	Charlton Athletic	6–1	5 April 2003
(England) Paul Scholes	Manchester United	Newcastle United	6–2	12 April 2003
(England) Michael Owen^{4}	Liverpool	West Bromwich Albion	6–0	26 April 2003
(Netherlands) Ruud van Nistelrooy	Manchester United	Charlton Athletic	4–1	3 May 2003
(England) Jermaine Pennant	Arsenal	Southampton	6–1	7 May 2003
(France) Robert Pires	Arsenal	Southampton	6–1	7 May 2003
(Sweden) Freddie Ljungberg	Arsenal	Sunderland	4–0	11 May 2003

- ^{4} Player scored 4 goals

=== Scoring ===
- First goal of the season: Michael Ricketts for Bolton Wanderers against Fulham (17 August 2002)
- Fastest goal of the season:
- Largest winning margin: 6 goals
  - West Bromwich Albion 0–6 Liverpool (26 April 2003)
- Highest scoring game: 8 goals
  - Manchester United 5–3 Newcastle United (23 November 2002)
  - Newcastle United 2–6 Manchester United (12 April 2003)
- Most goals scored in a match by a losing team: 3 goals
  - West Ham United 3–4 Leeds United (10 November 2002)
  - Manchester United 5–3 Newcastle United (23 November 2002)
  - Bolton Wanderers 4–3 Newcastle United (26 December 2002)
  - Tottenham Hotspur 4–3 Everton (12 January 2003)

=== Clean sheets ===
- Most clean sheets: 15
  - Blackburn Rovers
- Fewest clean sheets: 5
  - Tottenham Hotspur

=== Discipline ===
- Worst overall disciplinary record (1 pt per yellow card, 3 pts per red card):
- Best overall disciplinary record:
- Most yellow cards (club):
- Most yellow cards (player): 13 – Iván Campo (Bolton Wanderers)
- Most red cards (club):
- Most red card (player): 3
  - Franck Queudrue (Middlesbrough)
- Most fouls (player):

== Awards ==
=== Monthly awards ===
Month	Manager of the Month	Player of the Month
August	(England) Glenn Hoddle (Tottenham Hotspur)	(France) Sylvain Wiltord (Arsenal)
September	(France) Arsène Wenger (Arsenal)	(France) Thierry Henry (Arsenal)
October	(France) Gerard Houllier (Liverpool)	(Italy) Gianfranco Zola (Chelsea)
November	(Scotland) David Moyes (Everton)	(England) James Beattie (Southampton)
December	(Scotland) Gordon Strachan (Southampton)	(England) Alan Shearer (Newcastle United)
January	(England) Bobby Robson (Newcastle United)	(England) Paul Scholes (Manchester United)
February	(England) Alan Curbishly (Charlton)	(France) Robert Pires (Arsenal)
March	(England) Glenn Roeder (West Ham)	(England) Steven Gerrard (Liverpool)
April	(Scotland) Sir Alex Ferguson (Manchester United)	(Netherlands) Ruud Van Nistelrooy (Manchester United)

=== Annual awards ===
Award	Winner	Team
PFA Players' Player of the Year	(France) Thierry Henry	Arsenal
PFA Young Player of the Year	(England) Jermaine Jenas	Newcastle United
Premier League Manager of the Year	(Scotland) Sir Alex Ferguson	Manchester United
Premier League Player of the Year	(Netherlands) Ruud van Nistelrooy	Manchester United
Premier League Golden Boot	(Netherlands) Ruud van Nistelrooy	Manchester United
Premier League Golden Glove	(Italy) Carlo Cudicini	Chelsea
Goal of the Season	(France) Thierry Henry	Arsenal

PFA Team of the Year 2002–03

PFA Team of the Year
Goalkeeper	(United States) Brad Friedel (Blackburn Rovers)			
Defence	(England) Stephen Carr (Tottenham Hotspur)	(England) Sol Campbell (Arsenal)	(France) William Gallas (Chelsea)	(England) Ashley Cole (Arsenal)
Midfield	(England) Kieron Dyer (Newcastle United)	(England) Paul Scholes (Manchester United)	(France) Patrick Vieira (Arsenal)	(France) Robert Pires (Arsenal)
Attack	(England) Alan Shearer (Newcastle United)		(France) Thierry Henry (Arsenal)	

== See also ==
- 2002–03 in English football
- 2003–04 FA Premier League

== Attendances ==
No.	Club	Matches	Total attendance	Average
1	Manchester United	19	1,284,434	67,602
2	Newcastle United	19	986,542	51,923
3	Liverpool FC	19	821,612	43,243
4	Chelsea FC	19	755,896	39,784
5	Sunderland AFC	19	754,267	39,698
6	Leeds United	19	743,279	39,120
7	Everton FC	19	731,134	38,481
8	Arsenal FC	19	722,795	38,042
9	Tottenham Hotspur	19	682,049	35,897
10	Aston Villa	19	664,533	34,975
11	Manchester City	19	656,730	34,565
12	West Ham United	19	654,209	34,432
13	Middlesbrough FC	19	589,480	31,025
14	Southampton FC	19	582,928	30,680
15	Birmingham City	19	548,781	28,883
16	West Bromwich Albion	19	507,888	26,731
17	Charlton Athletic	19	498,855	26,256
18	Blackburn Rovers	19	498,287	26,226
19	Bolton Wanderers	19	475,322	25,017
20	Fulham FC	19	317,434	16,707
