= 2003–04 FA Premier League =

Football season in England

FA Premier League
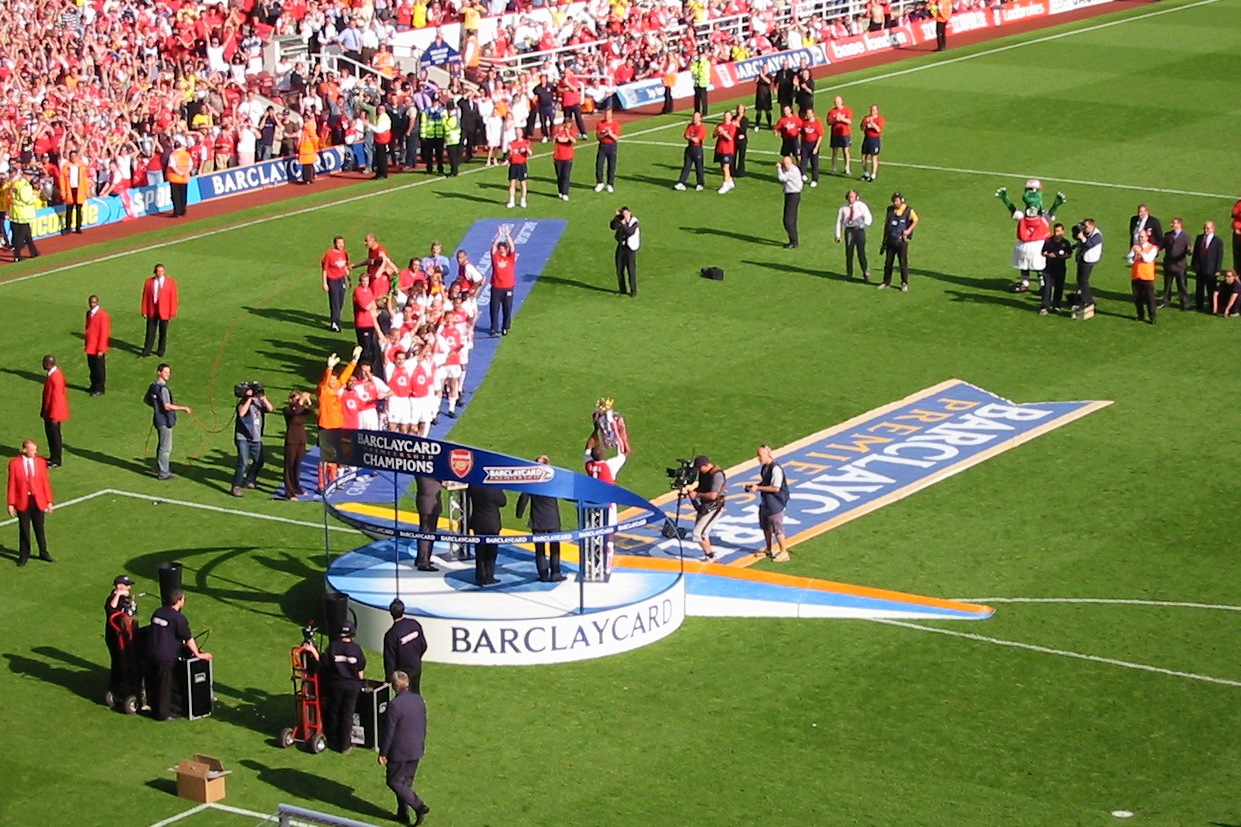
- Arsenal captain Patrick Vieira lifting the trophy at Highbury
- Season: 2003–04
- Dates: 16 August 2003 – 15 May 2004
- Champions: Arsenal; 3rd Premier League title 13th English title
- Relegated: Leicester City; Leeds United; Wolverhampton Wanderers
- Champions League: Arsenal; Chelsea; Manchester United; Liverpool
- UEFA Cup: Newcastle United; Middlesbrough
- Matches: 380
- Goals: 1,012 (2.66 per match)
- Top goalscorer: Thierry Henry (30 goals)
- Best goalkeeper: Jens Lehmann; Edwin van der Sar (15 clean sheets each)
- Biggest home win: Portsmouth 6–1 Leeds United (8 November 2003); Chelsea 5–0 Newcastle United (9 November 2003); Arsenal 5–0 Leeds United (16 April 2004)
- Biggest away win: Wolverhampton Wanderers 0–5 Chelsea (20 September 2003); Leicester City 0–5 Aston Villa (31 January 2004)
- Highest scoring: Manchester City 6–2 Bolton Wanderers (18 October 2003); Tottenham Hotspur 4–4 Leicester City (22 February 2004); Middlesbrough 5–3 Birmingham City (20 March 2004)
- Longest winning run: 9 games Arsenal
- Longest unbeaten run: 38 games Arsenal
- Longest winless run: 14 games Manchester City
- Longest losing run: 6 games Leeds United
- Highest attendance: 67,758; Manchester United 3–2 Southampton (31 January 2004)
- Lowest attendance: 13,981; Fulham 3–4 Blackburn Rovers (12 April 2004)
- Total attendance: 13,297,348
- Average attendance: 34,993

The 2003–04 FA Premier League (known as the FA Barclaycard Premiership) was the 12th season of the Premier League. Arsenal were crowned champions ending the season without a single defeat – the first team ever to do so in a 38–game league season. Chelsea finished second to Arsenal.

== Season summary ==
Having qualified for the Champions League the previous season, Chelsea were bolstered by a £100 million outlay on world-class players, a spree funded by the extensive financial resources of their new owner Roman Abramovich. Manchester United's attack was as strong as ever thanks to free-scoring Ruud van Nistelrooy, but the midfield was weakened following the £25 million pre-season sale of David Beckham to Real Madrid, and the centre of defence suffered a more severe setback after Rio Ferdinand was ruled out for the final four months of the season after being found guilty of the "failure or refusal to take a drugs test". The case of Rio Ferdinand started a debate about punishments relating to drug testing in football, with there being differing views on whether the punishment was too harsh or too lenient. Ferdinand's club sought to make direct comparisons with an earlier case of Manchester City reserve player who had in fact committed a lesser drug testing offence and as a result escaped with only a fine. City themselves had just moved from Maine Road to the City of Manchester Stadium.

Arsenal, meanwhile, had only signed German goalkeeper Jens Lehmann in the 2003 close season, but French striker Thierry Henry was instrumental in Arsenal's success. Away from the Premier League, Arsène Wenger's team suffered disappointment in the cup competitions; they were knocked-out by League Cup eventual winners Middlesbrough in the semi-finals, lost their grip on the FA Cup (which they held for two consecutive seasons) after being defeated by eventual winners Manchester United in the semi-finals, and were knocked out of the Champions League quarter-finals by Chelsea 3–2 on aggregate. These blows in the FA Cup and Champions League came within a few days of each other, and it was thought that Arsenal might squander their lead of the Premier League for the second successive season, but Arsenal easily defeated Liverpool only days later.

In the end, Wenger led the North-London club to a first undefeated season, solidifying his managerial legacy and longevity to the Arsenal fanbase as they finished the season with 26 wins, 12 draws, 0 defeats, and 90 points, winning the title with an 11-point margin over Claudio Ranieri's Chelsea. Thierry Henry proved decisive in the critical moments, inspiring comebacks against close rivals Liverpool and Chelsea, including a hat-trick to seal a 4–2 win having been 2–1 down.

The relegation spots were occupied by three teams bracketed together on 33 points. Wolves and Leicester City followed the trend of many other newly promoted Premier League clubs and were relegated just one season after reaching the top division. For Leicester City, they would not return to the top flight for another 10 years and became the league champions for the first time ever in their history just a season later, whilst Wolves were promoted back to the top flight in 2009 and slipped down again 3 years later. The other relegation place went to Leeds United, whose playing fortunes had dipped in the past two seasons after David O'Leary was sacked as manager and club debts had risen so high that many star players had to be sold. As a result, Leeds were relegated from the Premier League after 14 years of top division football – just three seasons after they had reached the Champions League semifinals - and they would not return for another 16 years, during which time they suffered a further relegation to the third tier in 2007 and came close towards going out of business in the process.

In his third season as Middlesbrough manager, Steve McClaren guided the Teessiders to their first ever major trophy – sealed with a 2–1 win over Bolton Wanderers in the League Cup final. McClaren was also the first English manager to win a major trophy since Brian Little guided Aston Villa to League Cup success in 1996. He was also the first manager to take Middlesbrough into European competition – they would be competing in the 2004–05 UEFA Cup.

== Teams ==
Twenty teams competed in the league – the top seventeen teams from the previous season and the three teams promoted from the First Division. The promoted teams were Portsmouth, Leicester City and Wolverhampton Wanderers, returning to the top flight after an absence of fifteen, one and nineteen years respectively. This was also both Portsmouth's and Wolverhampton Wanderers' first season in the Premier League. They replaced West Ham United, West Bromwich Albion and Sunderland, who were relegated to the First Division after spending time in the top flight for ten, one and four years respectively.

=== Stadiums and locations ===
Locations of the 2003–04 Premier League teams
Greater London Premier League football clubs
West Midlands Premier League football clubs

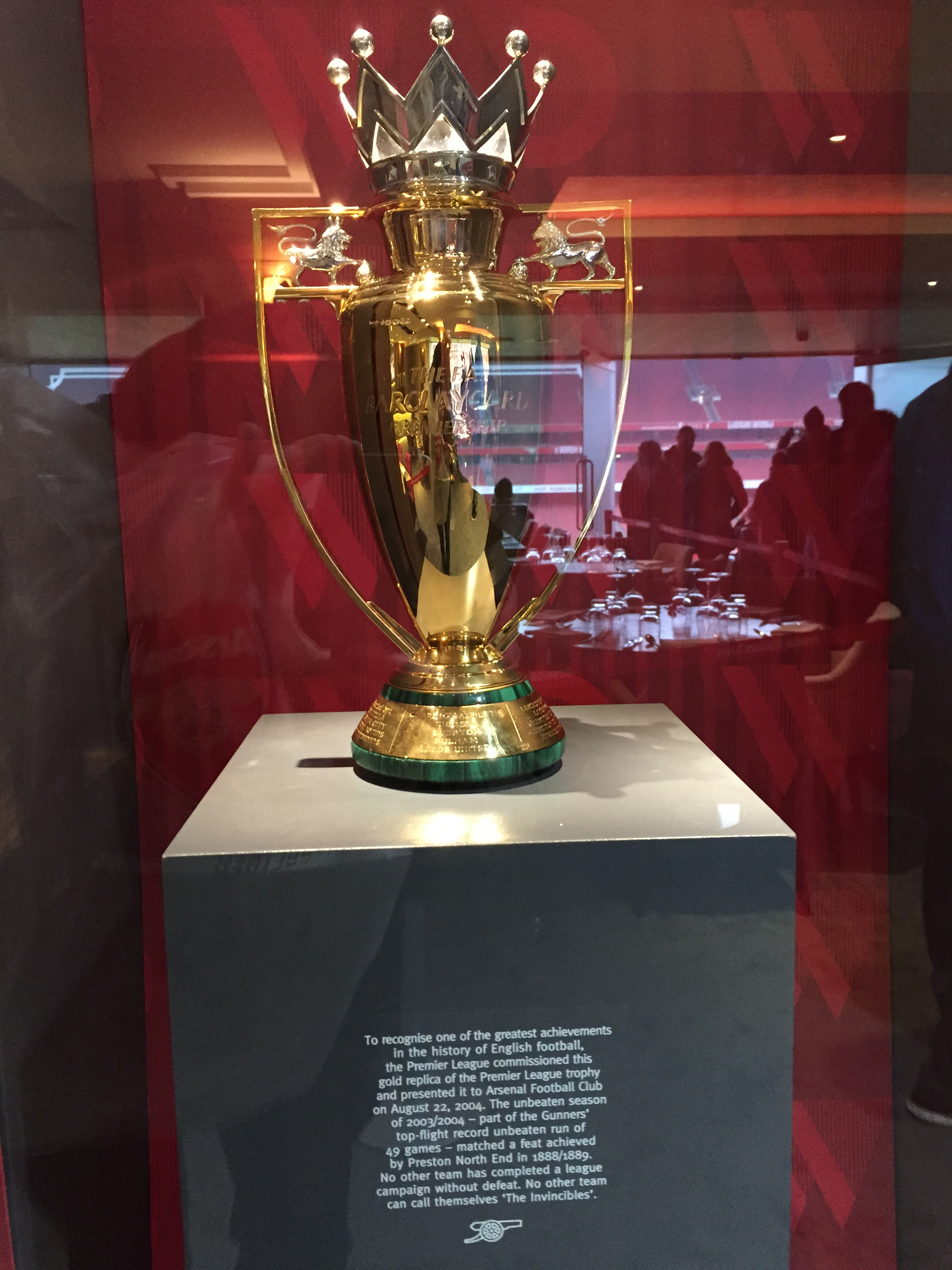
The Premier League commissioned a unique gold trophy to commemorate Arsenal's achievement of winning the league title without defeat.

Team	Location	Stadium	Capacity
Arsenal	London (Highbury)	Arsenal Stadium	38,419
Aston Villa	Birmingham (Aston)	Villa Park	42,553
Birmingham City	Birmingham (Bordesley)	St Andrew's	30,079
Blackburn Rovers	Blackburn	Ewood Park	31,367
Bolton Wanderers	Bolton	Reebok Stadium	28,723
Charlton Athletic	London (Charlton)	The Valley	27,111
Chelsea	London (Fulham)	Stamford Bridge	42,360
Everton	Liverpool (Walton)	Goodison Park	40,569
Fulham	London (Shepherd's Bush)	Loftus Road (Note: Craven Cottage was still under refurbishment from the previous season and as a result, Fulham continued playing their home games at Loftus Road, which is also the home stadium of fellow West London club Queens Park Rangers.)	18,493
Leeds United	Leeds	Elland Road	40,242
Leicester City	Leicester	Walkers Stadium	32,312
Liverpool	Liverpool (Anfield)	Anfield	45,276
Manchester City	Manchester (Bradford)	City of Manchester Stadium (Note: Manchester City moved to the City of Manchester Stadium after spending 80 years at Maine Road.)	48,000
Manchester United	Manchester (Old Trafford)	Old Trafford	68,217
Middlesbrough	Middlesbrough	Riverside Stadium	35,049
Newcastle United	Newcastle upon Tyne	St James' Park	52,387
Portsmouth	Portsmouth	Fratton Park	20,220
Southampton	Southampton	St Mary's Stadium	32,505
Tottenham Hotspur	London (Tottenham)	White Hart Lane	36,240
Wolverhampton Wanderers	Wolverhampton	Molineux Stadium	29,303

=== Personnel and kits ===
Team	Manager	Captain	Kit manufacturer	Shirt sponsor
Arsenal	(France) Arsène Wenger	(France) Patrick Vieira	Nike	O_{2}
Aston Villa	(Republic of Ireland) David O'Leary	(Sweden) Olof Mellberg	Diadora	Rover
Birmingham City	(England) Steve Bruce	(Republic of Ireland) Kenny Cunningham	Le Coq Sportif	Flybe
Blackburn Rovers	(Scotland) Graeme Souness	(England) Garry Flitcroft	Kappa	HSA
Bolton Wanderers	(England) Sam Allardyce	(Nigeria) Jay-Jay Okocha	Reebok	Reebok
Charlton Athletic	(England) Alan Curbishley	(Republic of Ireland) Matt Holland	Joma	All:Sports
Chelsea	(Italy) Claudio Ranieri	(France) Marcel Desailly	Umbro	Fly Emirates
Everton	(Scotland) David Moyes	(Scotland) David Weir	Puma	Kejian
Fulham	(Wales) Chris Coleman	(England) Lee Clark	Puma	dabs.com
Leeds United	(England) Kevin Blackwell	(Scotland) Dominic Matteo	Nike	Whyte and Mackay
Leicester City	(England) Micky Adams	(Scotland) Matt Elliott	Le Coq Sportif	Alliance & Leicester
Liverpool	(France) Gérard Houllier	(England) Steven Gerrard	Reebok	Carlsberg
Manchester City	(England) Kevin Keegan	(France) Sylvain Distin	Reebok	First Advice
Manchester United	(Scotland) Sir Alex Ferguson	(Republic of Ireland) Roy Keane	Nike	Vodafone
Middlesbrough	(England) Steve McClaren	(England) Gareth Southgate	Erreà	Dial-a-Phone
Newcastle United	(England) Sir Bobby Robson	(England) Alan Shearer	Adidas	Northern Rock
Portsmouth	(England) Harry Redknapp	(England) Teddy Sheringham	Pompey Sport	ty
Southampton	(Scotland) Paul Sturrock	(Norway) Claus Lundekvam	Saints	Friends Provident
Tottenham Hotspur	(England) David Pleat (caretaker)	(England) Jamie Redknapp	Kappa	Thomson Holidays
Wolverhampton Wanderers	(England) Dave Jones	(England) Paul Ince	Admiral	Doritos

=== Managerial changes ===
Team	Outgoing manager	Manner of departure	Date of vacancy	Position in table	Incoming manager	Date of appointment
Fulham	(Wales) Chris Coleman (caretaker)	End of caretaker period	12 May 2003	Pre-season	(Wales) Chris Coleman	15 May 2003
Aston Villa	(England) Graham Taylor	Resigned	14 May 2003	Pre-season	(Republic of Ireland) David O'Leary	20 May 2003
Tottenham Hotspur	(England) Glenn Hoddle	Sacked	22 September 2003	18th	(England) David Pleat	24 September 2003
Leeds United	(England) Peter Reid	Sacked	10 November 2003	20th	(Scotland) Eddie Gray	10 November 2003
Southampton	(Scotland) Gordon Strachan	Resigned	13 February 2004	12th	(Scotland) Paul Sturrock	4 March 2004
Leeds United	(Scotland) Eddie Gray	Mutual consent	10 May 2004	19th	(England) Kevin Blackwell	1 June 2004

== League table ==
Pos	Team	Pld	W	D	L	GF	GA	GD	Pts	Qualification or relegation
1	Arsenal (C)	38	26	12	0	73	26	+47	90	Qualification for the Champions League group stage
2	Chelsea	38	24	7	7	67	30	+37	79	Qualification for the Champions League group stage
3	Manchester United	38	23	6	9	64	35	+29	75	Qualification for the Champions League third qualifying round (Note: Since Manchester United qualified for the Champions League, their place in the UEFA Cup as 2003–04 FA Cup winners went to First Division club Millwall, who were the FA Cup runners-up.)
4	Liverpool	38	16	12	10	55	37	+18	60	Qualification for the Champions League third qualifying round
5	Newcastle United	38	13	17	8	52	40	+12	56	Qualification for the UEFA Cup first round
6	Aston Villa	38	15	11	12	48	44	+4	56	
7	Charlton Athletic	38	14	11	13	51	51	0	53	
8	Bolton Wanderers	38	14	11	13	48	56	−8	53	
9	Fulham	38	14	10	14	52	46	+6	52	
10	Birmingham City	38	12	14	12	43	48	−5	50	
11	Middlesbrough	38	13	9	16	44	52	−8	48	Qualification for the UEFA Cup first round (Note: Middlesbrough qualified as the 2003–04 Football League Cup winners.)
12	Southampton	38	12	11	15	44	45	−1	47	
13	Portsmouth	38	12	9	17	47	54	−7	45	
14	Tottenham Hotspur	38	13	6	19	47	57	−10	45	
15	Blackburn Rovers	38	12	8	18	51	59	−8	44	
16	Manchester City	38	9	14	15	55	54	+1	41	
17	Everton	38	9	12	17	45	57	−12	39	
18	Leicester City (R)	38	6	15	17	48	65	−17	33	Relegation to the Football League Championship
19	Leeds United (R)	38	8	9	21	40	79	−39	33	Relegation to the Football League Championship
20	Wolverhampton Wanderers (R)	38	7	12	19	38	77	−39	33	Relegation to the Football League Championship

Source: Premier League
Rules for classification: 1) points; 2) goal difference; 3) number of goals scored.
(C) Champions; (R) Relegated

=== Season statistics ===
Total goals: 1,012
Average goals per game: 2.66

== Results ==
Home \ Away	ARS	AVL	BIR	BLB	BOL	CHA	CHE	EVE	FUL	LEE	LEI	LIV	MCI	MUN	MID	NEW	POR	SOU	TOT	WOL
Arsenal		2–0	0–0	1–0	2–1	2–1	2–1	2–1	0–0	5–0	2–1	4–2	2–1	1–1	4–1	3–2	1–1	2–0	2–1	3–0
Aston Villa	0–2		2–2	0–2	1–1	2–1	3–2	0–0	3–0	2–0	3–1	0–0	1–1	0–2	0–2	0–0	2–1	1–0	1–0	3–2
Birmingham City	0–3	0–0		0–4	2–0	1–2	0–0	3–0	2–2	4–1	0–1	0–3	2–1	1–2	3–1	1–1	2–0	2–1	1–0	2–2
Blackburn Rovers	0–2	0–2	1–1		3–4	0–1	2–3	2–1	0–2	1–2	1–0	1–3	2–3	1–0	2–2	1–1	1–2	1–1	1–0	5–1
Bolton Wanderers	1–1	2–2	0–1	2–2		0–0	0–2	2–0	0–2	4–1	2–2	2–2	1–3	1–2	2–0	1–0	1–0	0–0	2–0	1–1
Charlton Athletic	1–1	1–2	1–1	3–2	1–2		4–2	2–2	3–1	0–1	2–2	3–2	0–3	0–2	1–0	0–0	1–1	2–1	2–4	2–0
Chelsea	1–2	1–0	0–0	2–2	1–2	1–0		0–0	2–1	1–0	2–1	0–1	1–0	1–0	0–0	5–0	3–0	4–0	4–2	5–2
Everton	1–1	2–0	1–0	0–1	1–2	0–1	0–1		3–1	4–0	3–2	0–3	0–0	3–4	1–1	2–2	1–0	0–0	3–1	2–0
Fulham	0–1	1–2	0–0	3–4	2–1	2–0	0–1	2–1		2–0	2–0	1–2	2–2	1–1	3–2	2–3	2–0	2–0	2–1	0–0
Leeds United	1–4	0–0	0–2	2–1	0–2	3–3	1–1	1–1	3–2		3–2	2–2	2–1	0–1	0–3	2–2	1–2	0–0	0–1	4–1
Leicester City	1–1	0–5	0–2	2–0	1–1	1–1	0–4	1–1	0–2	4–0		0–0	1–1	1–4	0–0	1–1	3–1	2–2	1–2	0–0
Liverpool	1–2	1–0	3–1	4–0	3–1	0–1	1–2	0–0	0–0	3–1	2–1		2–1	1–2	2–0	1–1	3–0	1–2	0–0	1–0
Manchester City	1–2	4–1	0–0	1–1	6–2	1–1	0–1	5–1	0–0	1–1	0–3	2–2		4–1	0–1	1–0	1–1	1–3	0–0	3–3
Manchester United	0–0	4–0	3–0	2–1	4–0	2–0	1–1	3–2	1–3	1–1	1–0	0–1	3–1		2–3	0–0	3–0	3–2	3–0	1–0
Middlesbrough	0–4	1–2	5–3	0–1	2–0	0–0	1–2	1–0	2–1	2–3	3–3	0–0	2–1	0–1		0–1	0–0	3–1	1–0	2–0
Newcastle United	0–0	1–1	0–1	0–1	0–0	3–1	2–1	4–2	3–1	1–0	3–1	1–1	3–0	1–2	2–1		3–0	1–0	4–0	1–1
Portsmouth	1–1	2–1	3–1	1–2	4–0	1–2	0–2	1–2	1–1	6–1	0–2	1–0	4–2	1–0	5–1	1–1		1–0	2–0	0–0
Southampton	0–1	1–1	0–0	2–0	1–2	3–2	0–1	3–3	0–0	2–1	0–0	2–0	0–2	1–0	0–1	3–3	3–0		1–0	2–0
Tottenham Hotspur	2–2	2–1	4–1	1–0	0–1	0–1	0–1	3–0	0–3	2–1	4–4	2–1	1–1	1–2	0–0	1–0	4–3	1–3		5–2
Wolverhampton Wanderers	1–3	0–4	1–1	2–2	1–2	0–4	0–5	2–1	2–1	3–1	4–3	1–1	1–0	1–0	2–0	1–1	0–0	1–4	0–2	

Source: Premier League
Legend: Blue = home team win; Yellow = draw; Red = away team win.

== Overall ==
- Most wins – Arsenal (26)
- Fewest wins – Leicester City (6)
- Most draws – Newcastle United (17)
- Fewest draws – Manchester United and Tottenham Hotspur (6)
- Most losses – Leeds United (21)
- Fewest losses – Arsenal (0)
- Most goals scored – Arsenal (73)
- Fewest goals scored – Wolverhampton Wanderers (38)
- Most goals conceded – Leeds United (79)
- Fewest goals conceded – Arsenal (26)

== Scoring ==
- First goal of the season:
  (Scotland) Paul Dickov for Leicester City against Southampton (16 August 2003)
- Last goal of the season:
  (England) Shaun Wright-Phillips for Manchester City against Everton (15 May 2004)

== Top scorers ==
Rank	Player	Club	Goals
1	(France) Thierry Henry	Arsenal	30
2	(England) Alan Shearer	Newcastle United	22
3	(France) Louis Saha	Manchester United/Fulham	20
3	(Netherlands) Ruud van Nistelrooy	Manchester United	20
5	(Finland) Mikael Forssell	Birmingham City	17
6	(France) Nicolas Anelka	Manchester City	16
6	(Colombia) Juan Pablo Ángel	Aston Villa	16
6	(England) Michael Owen	Liverpool	16
6	(Nigeria) Yakubu	Portsmouth	16
10	(England) James Beattie	Southampton	14
10	(Republic of Ireland) Robbie Keane	Tottenham Hotspur	14
10	(France) Robert Pires	Arsenal	14

== Awards ==
=== Monthly awards ===
Month	Manager of the Month	Player of the Month
August	(France) Arsène Wenger (Arsenal)	(England) Teddy Sheringham (Portsmouth)
September	(Italy) Claudio Ranieri (Chelsea)	(England) Frank Lampard (Chelsea)
October	(England) Sir Bobby Robson (Newcastle United)	(England) Alan Shearer (Newcastle United)
November	(England) Sam Allardyce (Bolton Wanderers)	(Nigeria) Jay-Jay Okocha (Bolton Wanderers)
December	(Scotland) Sir Alex Ferguson (Manchester United)	(England) Paul Scholes (Manchester United)
January	(England) Sam Allardyce (Bolton Wanderers)	(France) Thierry Henry (Arsenal)
February	(France) Arsène Wenger (Arsenal)	(Netherlands) Dennis Bergkamp (Arsenal) & (Brazil) Edu (Arsenal)
March	(Italy) Claudio Ranieri (Chelsea)	(Finland) Mikael Forssell (Birmingham City)
April	(England) Harry Redknapp (Portsmouth)	(France) Thierry Henry (Arsenal)

=== Annual awards ===
Award	Winner	Club
LMA Manager of the Year	(France) Arsène Wenger	Arsenal
PFA Players' Player of the Year	(France) Thierry Henry	Arsenal
PFA Young Player of the Year	(England) Scott Parker	Charlton Athletic
PFA Fans' Player of the Year	(France) Thierry Henry	Arsenal
FWA Footballer of the Year	(France) Thierry Henry	Arsenal
Premier League Manager of the Year	(France) Arsène Wenger	Arsenal

PFA Team of the Year

PFA Team of the Year
Goalkeeper	(United States) Tim Howard (Manchester United)			
Defenders	(Cameroon) Lauren (Arsenal)	(England) Sol Campbell (Arsenal)	(England) John Terry (Chelsea)	(England) Ashley Cole (Arsenal)
Midfielders	(England) Steven Gerrard (Liverpool)	(France) Patrick Vieira (Arsenal)	(France) Robert Pires (Arsenal)	(England) Frank Lampard (Chelsea)
Forwards	(France) Thierry Henry (Arsenal)		(Netherlands) Ruud van Nistelrooy (Manchester United)	

== Attendances ==
No.	Club	Matches	Total attendance	Average
1	Manchester United	19	1,285,175	67,641
2	Newcastle United	19	977,358	51,440
3	Manchester City	19	889,854	46,834
4	Liverpool	19	810,867	42,677
5	Chelsea	19	783,461	41,235
6	Everton	19	737,912	38,837
7	Arsenal	19	723,498	38,079
8	Leeds United	19	696,657	36,666
9	Aston Villa	19	695,811	36,622
10	Tottenham Hotspur	19	663,840	34,939
11	Southampton	19	595,663	31,351
12	Leicester City	19	588,674	30,983
13	Middlesbrough	19	588,556	30,977
14	Wolverhampton Wanderers	19	548,604	28,874
15	Birmingham City	19	545,969	28,735
16	Bolton Wanderers	19	509,104	26,795
17	Charlton Athletic	19	500,641	26,350
18	Blackburn Rovers	19	463,146	24,376
19	Portsmouth	19	382,054	20,108
20	Fulham	19	310,504	16,342

== See also ==
- 2003–04 in English football
