= 2020–21 Premier League =

Football season in England

Premier League
- Season: 2020–21
- Dates: 12 September 2020 – 23 May 2021
- Champions: Manchester City; 5th Premier League title 7th English title
- Relegated: Fulham; West Bromwich Albion; Sheffield United
- Champions League: Manchester City; Manchester United; Liverpool; Chelsea
- Europa League: Leicester City; West Ham United
- Europa Conference League: Tottenham Hotspur
- Matches: 380
- Goals: 1,024 (2.69 per match)
- Best player: Rúben Dias
- Top goalscorer: Harry Kane (23 goals)
- Best goalkeeper: Ederson (19 clean sheets)
- Biggest home win: Manchester United 9–0 Southampton (2 February 2021)
- Biggest away win: Crystal Palace 0–7 Liverpool (19 December 2020)
- Highest scoring: Aston Villa 7–2 Liverpool (4 October 2020); Manchester United 9–0 Southampton (2 February 2021)
- Longest winning run: 15 matches Manchester City
- Longest unbeaten run: 19 matches Manchester City
- Longest winless run: 17 matches Sheffield United
- Longest losing run: 8 matches Sheffield United
- Highest attendance: 10,000; 6 matches
- Lowest attendance: 2,000; 16 matches
- Total attendance: 180,601
- Average attendance: 5,160 (excluding matches played behind closed doors)

The 2020–21 Premier League was the 29th season of the Premier League, the top English professional league for association football clubs since its establishment in 1992 and the 122nd season of top-flight English football overall. The season was initially scheduled to start on 8 August 2020 and end on 16 May 2021, but this was delayed until 12 September as a consequence of the postponement of the previous season's conclusion due to the COVID-19 pandemic. Liverpool were the defending champions, having won their first Premier League and nineteenth English league title the previous season.

In a season largely played behind closed doors, Manchester City secured a fifth Premier League title and seventh English league title overall with three matches to spare; it was also the club's third title in the last four seasons.

== Summary ==
=== Impact of COVID-19 pandemic ===
At the start of this season, as was the case at the end of the previous season, there was limited or no attendance at matches besides each team's staff and personnel. On 23 November 2020, it was announced that some fans would be allowed to return to stadiums in low-risk areas at the end of the second national lockdown on 2 December 2020. The announcement of a third national lockdown on 4 January 2021, though, signalled a return to matches being played behind closed doors.

As fans initially were not allowed to attend matches, an agreement was made for all matches to be televised up until at least the October international break. The league's major broadcast partners Sky Sports and BT Sport broadcast the vast majority of the matches between them, whilst Amazon Prime Video and the BBC were also allotted additional live matches during the season. Following the October international break, Sky and BT trialled a revised format with the launch of a pay-per-view service for matches not selected for live broadcast on their main channels. Following strong opposition from fans, the format was discontinued after the November round of international matches and all matches were again shown across the league's four broadcast partners. This continued for the remainder of the season, making this the first Premier League season in which all matches across the entire campaign were televised.

On 22 February 2021, Prime Minister Boris Johnson announced as the third step of recovery from the lockdown imposed on 4 January, that subject to certain criteria being met on vaccines, infection rates and new coronavirus variants, large football stadiums would be allowed to reopen on 17 May with a maximum of 10,000 spectators or 25% capacity, whichever was higher. This meant that the final round of fixtures scheduled for 23 May would see spectators return to the stadium. To ensure all clubs played their final home game in front of fans, the penultimate round of fixtures were rearranged to take place on 18–19 May. No away fans were permitted for these matches.

=== Season summary ===
The 2020–21 season began on Saturday 12 September, just seven weeks after the conclusion of the 2019–20 season. Liverpool were the defending champions, having won their nineteenth league title the previous season and their first in the Premier League era. As originally planned, the 2020–21 season was to be the second Premier League season with a mid-season break in February, whereby five games of a normal round of ten would be played on one weekend and the remaining five the following weekend. However, due to the late start of the league and fixture congestion, the winter break was scrapped and instead the 18th round of matches in mid-January was split across two midweeks. It was also the second Premier League season to use VAR (Video Assistant Referee).

==== The race for first place ====
The top of the table was tight for the first months of the season, with Arsenal, Leicester City, Everton, Liverpool, Southampton and Tottenham Hotspur all having occupied first position by late November.

==== Liverpool's title defence collapses and Manchester City become Champions ====
Liverpool, despite having suffered a 7-2 loss against Aston Villa in October, overtook Tottenham again in mid-December, following a meeting between the two clubs at Anfield which resulted in a 2–1 win to Liverpool and by Christmas, had opened up a five-point gap following a 7–0 away win against Crystal Palace. However, in the new year, they suffered from a significant slump in form. They suffered their first home defeat in 69 games with a 1–0 defeat to Burnley, which began a run of six consecutive losses at Anfield, following losses to Brighton & Hove Albion, Manchester City, Everton, Chelsea and Fulham, dropping to eighth place by early March. Manchester United, who were 15th at the beginning of November but sat behind them on goal difference at the start of January, overtook them at the top of the table later that month with a 1–0 away win against Burnley, but they were in turn replaced by Manchester City at the end of the month as a 5–0 Manchester City win over West Bromwich Albion was followed by a 2–1 home defeat for Manchester United against Sheffield United. This was to prove the final change of team at the top, as Manchester City, who were 13th in November, went on a 15-match winning streak which saw them 15 points clear of second-place Manchester United after a 4–1 win against Wolverhampton Wanderers on 2 March. They went on to secure the title on 12 May 2021 with three matches to spare, following a home defeat for Manchester United against Leicester. It was the club's fifth Premier League title and seventh English league title overall, as well as their third title in the past four seasons.

==== UEFA Champions League qualification and Chelsea win Champions League ====
Despite missing out on the title, Manchester United finished 2nd whilst managing to go the season unbeaten away from home as they qualified for a second successive season, becoming only the second team in the Premier League era to do so after Arsenal in both 2001-02 and their invincible season of 2003-04. The remaining two slots for Champions League qualification were taken by Liverpool and Chelsea. Although Liverpool were 8th with ten games remaining, a run of eight wins from their final ten games, including a 95th-minute winner scored by goalkeeper Alisson against West Bromwich Albion, saw them recover their position to finish 3rd and qualify for a fifth straight season. Chelsea endured a difficult start to the season under Frank Lampard, who was sacked in January with the club in 9th position and replaced by Thomas Tuchel. The club's form improved under Tuchel to secure a second consecutive finish in 4th place, despite a final day defeat to Aston Villa. They won in that season's Champions League final the next week, in the competition's third all-English final against champions Manchester City.

==== UEFA Europa League qualification ====
Leicester enjoyed a successful season, spending more time in the top four places than any other club as well as winning that season's FA Cup against Chelsea; however, three defeats in their final four games, including a home defeat to Tottenham Hotspur on the final day, saw them narrowly finish in 5th for a second consecutive season. Having narrowly avoiding relegation the previous season, West Ham United surprised many by finishing 6th, their highest finish since 1998–99. Both these clubs earned qualification to the Europa League for the following season.

==== UEFA Europa Conference League qualification ====
Despite leading the table in November, Tottenham suffered a string of poor results from that point onwards. Manager Jose Mourinho was sacked in April with the club in 7th place, with Ryan Mason taking over as interim manager for the rest of the season. Mason was unable to improve the club's position and they finished 7th, their lowest finish since the 2008–09 season, but still good enough to qualify for the brand new third tier Europa Conference League competition. Meanwhile, their traditional North London rivals Arsenal endured an even worse campaign; despite leading the table in September, eight defeats in their first 14 games left them in 15th just before Christmas and seemingly in danger of being sucked into a relegation battle. Whilst they would pick up enough points thereafter to pull away from the bottom half of the table, the Gunners could only finish 8th for a second successive season as they failed to qualify for European competition for the first time since the 1994–95 season.

==== Relegation and Leeds United success ====
On 17 April 2021, Sheffield United were confirmed to be the first team to be relegated to the Championship following a 1–0 defeat away to Wolverhampton Wanderers with six games remaining, ending their two-year top flight tenure. On 9 May 2021, West Bromwich Albion became the second team to be relegated following a 3–1 defeat away to Arsenal, with three games remaining, immediately returning to the Championship after a season's presence in the top flight. On 10 May 2021, Fulham were the third and final team to be relegated following a 2–0 defeat at home against Burnley with three games remaining, also immediately returning to the Championship after a season's presence in the top flight. This also marked the first time in the Premier League era that all three teams have been relegated with more than two games to spare and that all three teams didn't reach the 30 point mark in the season. In contrast, the final promoted team, Leeds United, finished in 9th with 59 points, the highest points tally for a newly promoted side since Ipswich Town (66 points) in 2000–01.

== Teams ==
Twenty teams competed in the league – the top seventeen teams from the previous season and the three teams promoted from the Championship. The promoted teams were Leeds United, West Bromwich Albion and Fulham, after respective top flight absences of sixteen, two and one year(s). They replaced Bournemouth, Watford (both teams relegated to the Championship after five years in the top flight), and Norwich City (relegated after a year back in the top flight).

=== Stadiums and locations ===
Locations of the 2020–21 Premier League teams
Greater London Premier League football clubs
West Midlands Premier League football clubs

Note: Table lists in alphabetical order.

Team	Location	Stadium	Capacity
Arsenal	London (Holloway)	Emirates Stadium	60,704
Aston Villa	Birmingham	Villa Park	42,682
Brighton & Hove Albion	Falmer	Falmer Stadium	30,750
Burnley	Burnley	Turf Moor	21,944
Chelsea	London (Fulham)	Stamford Bridge	40,834
Crystal Palace	London (Selhurst)	Selhurst Park	25,486
Everton	Liverpool (Walton)	Goodison Park	39,414
Fulham	London (Fulham)	Craven Cottage	19,359
Leeds United	Leeds	Elland Road	37,792
Leicester City	Leicester	King Power Stadium	32,261
Liverpool	Liverpool (Anfield)	Anfield	53,394
Manchester City	Manchester (Bradford)	City of Manchester Stadium	55,017
Manchester United	Trafford	Old Trafford	74,140
Newcastle United	Newcastle upon Tyne	St James' Park	52,305
Sheffield United	Sheffield	Bramall Lane	32,050
Southampton	Southampton	St Mary's Stadium	32,384
Tottenham Hotspur	London (Tottenham)	Tottenham Hotspur Stadium	62,303
West Bromwich Albion	West Bromwich	The Hawthorns	26,688
West Ham United	London (Stratford)	London Stadium	60,000
Wolverhampton Wanderers	Wolverhampton	Molineux Stadium	32,050

=== Personnel and kits ===
Team	Manager	Captain	Kit manufacturer	Shirt sponsor (chest)	Shirt sponsor (sleeve)
Arsenal	(Spain) Mikel Arteta	(Gabon) Pierre-Emerick Aubameyang	Adidas	Emirates	Visit Rwanda
Aston Villa	(England) Dean Smith	(England) Jack Grealish	Kappa	Cazoo	LT
Brighton & Hove Albion	(England) Graham Potter	(England) Lewis Dunk	Nike	American Express	SnickersUK.com
Burnley	(England) Sean Dyche	(England) Ben Mee	Umbro	LoveBet	
Chelsea	(Germany) Thomas Tuchel	(Spain) César Azpilicueta	Nike	Three	Hyundai
Crystal Palace	(England) Roy Hodgson	(Serbia) Luka Milivojević	Puma	W88	Iqoniq
Everton	(Italy) Carlo Ancelotti	(Republic of Ireland) Séamus Coleman	Hummel	Cazoo	None
Fulham	(England) Scott Parker	(Scotland) Tom Cairney	Adidas	BetVictor	ClearScore
Leeds United	(Argentina) Marcelo Bielsa	(Scotland) Liam Cooper	Adidas	SBOTOP	JD Sports
Leicester City	(Northern Ireland) Brendan Rodgers	(Jamaica) Wes Morgan	Adidas	Two sponsors: Tourism Authority of Thailand (home and away kits) King Power (third)	Bia Saigon
Liverpool	(Germany) Jürgen Klopp	(England) Jordan Henderson	Nike	Standard Chartered	Expedia
Manchester City	(Spain) Pep Guardiola	(Brazil) Fernandinho	Puma	Etihad Airways	Nexen Tire
Manchester United	(Norway) Ole Gunnar Solskjær	(England) Harry Maguire	Adidas	Chevrolet	Kohler
Newcastle United	(England) Steve Bruce	(England) Jamaal Lascelles	Puma	FUN88	ICM.com
Sheffield United	(England) Paul Heckingbottom (caretaker)	(England) Billy Sharp	Adidas	Union Standard Group	
Southampton	(Austria) Ralph Hasenhüttl	(England) James Ward-Prowse	Under Armour	Sportsbet.io	Virgin Media
Tottenham Hotspur	(England) Ryan Mason (caretaker)	(France) Hugo Lloris	Nike	AIA	Cinch
West Bromwich Albion	(England) Sam Allardyce	(England) Jake Livermore	Puma	Ideal Boilers	12BET
West Ham United	(Scotland) David Moyes	(England) Mark Noble	Umbro	Betway	Scope Markets
Wolverhampton Wanderers	(Portugal) Nuno Espírito Santo	(England) Conor Coady	Adidas	ManBetX	Aeroset

=== Managerial changes ===
Team	Outgoing manager	Manner of departure	Date of vacancy	Position in table	Incoming manager	Date of appointment
West Bromwich Albion	(Croatia) Slaven Bilić	Sacked	16 December 2020	19th	(England) Sam Allardyce	16 December 2020
Chelsea	(England) Frank Lampard	Sacked	25 January 2021	9th	(Germany) Thomas Tuchel	26 January 2021
Sheffield United	(England) Chris Wilder	Sacked	13 March 2021	20th	(England) Paul Heckingbottom (interim)	13 March 2021
Tottenham Hotspur	(Portugal) José Mourinho	Sacked	19 April 2021	7th	(England) Ryan Mason (interim)	19 April 2021

== League table ==
Pos	Team	Pld	W	D	L	GF	GA	GD	Pts	Qualification or relegation
1	Manchester City (C)	38	27	5	6	83	32	+51	86	Qualification for the Champions League group stage
2	Manchester United	38	21	11	6	73	44	+29	74	Qualification for the Champions League group stage
3	Liverpool	38	20	9	9	68	42	+26	69	Qualification for the Champions League group stage
4	Chelsea	38	19	10	9	58	36	+22	67	Qualification for the Champions League group stage
5	Leicester City	38	20	6	12	68	50	+18	66	Qualification for the Europa League group stage (Note: Since the winners of the 2020–21 FA Cup, Leicester City, also qualified for the Europa League based on league position, the second Europa League group stage berth allocated to England was transferred to the sixth-placed team.)
6	West Ham United	38	19	8	11	62	47	+15	65	Qualification for the Europa League group stage
7	Tottenham Hotspur	38	18	8	12	68	45	+23	62	Qualification for the Europa Conference League play-off round (Note: Since the winners of the 2020–21 EFL Cup, Manchester City, qualified for European competition based on league position, the Europa Conference League berth awarded to the EFL Cup winners was transferred to the highest-placed Premier League team not already qualified for European competition, the seventh-placed team.)
8	Arsenal	38	18	7	13	55	39	+16	61	
9	Leeds United	38	18	5	15	62	54	+8	59	
10	Everton	38	17	8	13	47	48	−1	59	
11	Aston Villa	38	16	7	15	55	46	+9	55	
12	Newcastle United	38	12	9	17	46	62	−16	45	
13	Wolverhampton Wanderers	38	12	9	17	36	52	−16	45	
14	Crystal Palace	38	12	8	18	41	66	−25	44	
15	Southampton	38	12	7	19	47	68	−21	43	
16	Brighton & Hove Albion	38	9	14	15	40	46	−6	41	
17	Burnley	38	10	9	19	33	55	−22	39	
18	Fulham (R)	38	5	13	20	27	53	−26	28	Relegation to EFL Championship
19	West Bromwich Albion (R)	38	5	11	22	35	76	−41	26	Relegation to EFL Championship
20	Sheffield United (R)	38	7	2	29	20	63	−43	23	Relegation to EFL Championship

Source: Premier League
Rules for classification: 1) Points; 2) Goal difference; 3) Goals scored; 4) If the champions, relegated teams or qualified teams for UEFA competitions cannot be determined by rules 1 to 3, rules 4.1 to 4.3 are applied – 4.1) Points gained in head-to-head record between such teams; 4.2) Away goals scored in head-to-head record between such teams; 4.3) Play-offs
(C) Champions; (R) Relegated

== Results ==
Home \ Away	ARS	AVL	BHA	BUR	CHE	CRY	EVE	FUL	LEE	LEI	LIV	MCI	MUN	NEW	SHU	SOU	TOT	WBA	WHU	WOL
Arsenal	—	0–3	2–0	0–1	3–1	0–0	0–1	1–1	4–2	0–1	0–3	0–1	0–0	3–0	2–1	1–1	2–1	3–1	2–1	1–2
Aston Villa	1–0	—	1–2	0–0	2–1	3–0	0–0	3–1	0–3	1–2	7–2	1–2	1–3	2–0	1–0	3–4	0–2	2–2	1–3	0–0
Brighton & Hove Albion	0–1	0–0	—	0–0	1–3	1–2	0–0	0–0	2–0	1–2	1–1	3–2	2–3	3–0	1–1	1–2	1–0	1–1	1–1	3–3
Burnley	1–1	3–2	1–1	—	0–3	1–0	1–1	1–1	0–4	1–1	0–3	0–2	0–1	1–2	1–0	0–1	0–1	0–0	1–2	2–1
Chelsea	0–1	1–1	0–0	2–0	—	4–0	2–0	2–0	3–1	2–1	0–2	1–3	0–0	2–0	4–1	3–3	0–0	2–5	3–0	0–0
Crystal Palace	1–3	3–2	1–1	0–3	1–4	—	1–2	0–0	4–1	1–1	0–7	0–2	0–0	0–2	2–0	1–0	1–1	1–0	2–3	1–0
Everton	2–1	1–2	4–2	1–2	1–0	1–1	—	0–2	0–1	1–1	2–2	1–3	1–3	0–2	0–1	1–0	2–2	5–2	0–1	1–0
Fulham	0–3	0–3	0–0	0–2	0–1	1–2	2–3	—	1–2	0–2	1–1	0–3	1–2	0–2	1–0	0–0	0–1	2–0	0–0	0–1
Leeds United	0–0	0–1	0–1	1–0	0–0	2–0	1–2	4–3	—	1–4	1–1	1–1	0–0	5–2	2–1	3–0	3–1	3–1	1–2	0–1
Leicester City	1–3	0–1	3–0	4–2	2–0	2–1	0–2	1–2	1–3	—	3–1	0–2	2–2	2–4	5–0	2–0	2–4	3–0	0–3	1–0
Liverpool	3–1	2–1	0–1	0–1	0–1	2–0	0–2	0–1	4–3	3–0	—	1–4	0–0	1–1	2–1	2–0	2–1	1–1	2–1	4–0
Manchester City	1–0	2–0	1–0	5–0	1–2	4–0	5–0	2–0	1–2	2–5	1–1	—	0–2	2–0	1–0	5–2	3–0	1–1	2–1	4–1
Manchester United	0–1	2–1	2–1	3–1	0–0	1–3	3–3	1–1	6–2	1–2	2–4	0–0	—	3–1	1–2	9–0	1–6	1–0	1–0	1–0
Newcastle United	0–2	1–1	0–3	3–1	0–2	1–2	2–1	1–1	1–2	1–2	0–0	3–4	1–4	—	1–0	3–2	2–2	2–1	3–2	1–1
Sheffield United	0–3	1–0	1–0	1–0	1–2	0–2	0–1	1–1	0–1	1–2	0–2	0–1	2–3	1–0	—	0–2	1–3	2–1	0–1	0–2
Southampton	1–3	0–1	1–2	3–2	1–1	3–1	2–0	3–1	0–2	1–1	1–0	0–1	2–3	2–0	3–0	—	2–5	2–0	0–0	1–2
Tottenham Hotspur	2–0	1–2	2–1	4–0	0–1	4–1	0–1	1–1	3–0	0–2	1–3	2–0	1–3	1–1	4–0	2–1	—	2–0	3–3	2–0
West Bromwich Albion	0–4	0–3	1–0	0–0	3–3	1–5	0–1	2–2	0–5	0–3	1–2	0–5	1–1	0–0	1–0	3–0	0–1	—	1–3	1–1
West Ham United	3–3	2–1	2–2	1–0	0–1	1–1	0–1	1–0	2–0	3–2	1–3	1–1	1–3	0–2	3–0	3–0	2–1	2–1	—	4–0
Wolverhampton Wanderers	2–1	0–1	2–1	0–4	2–1	2–0	1–2	1–0	1–0	0–0	0–1	1–3	1–2	1–1	1–0	1–1	1–1	2–3	2–3	—

Source: Premier League
Legend: Blue = home team win; Yellow = draw; Red = away team win.
For upcoming matches, an "a" indicates there is an article about the rivalry between the two participants.

== Season statistics ==
=== Scoring ===
==== Top scorers ====
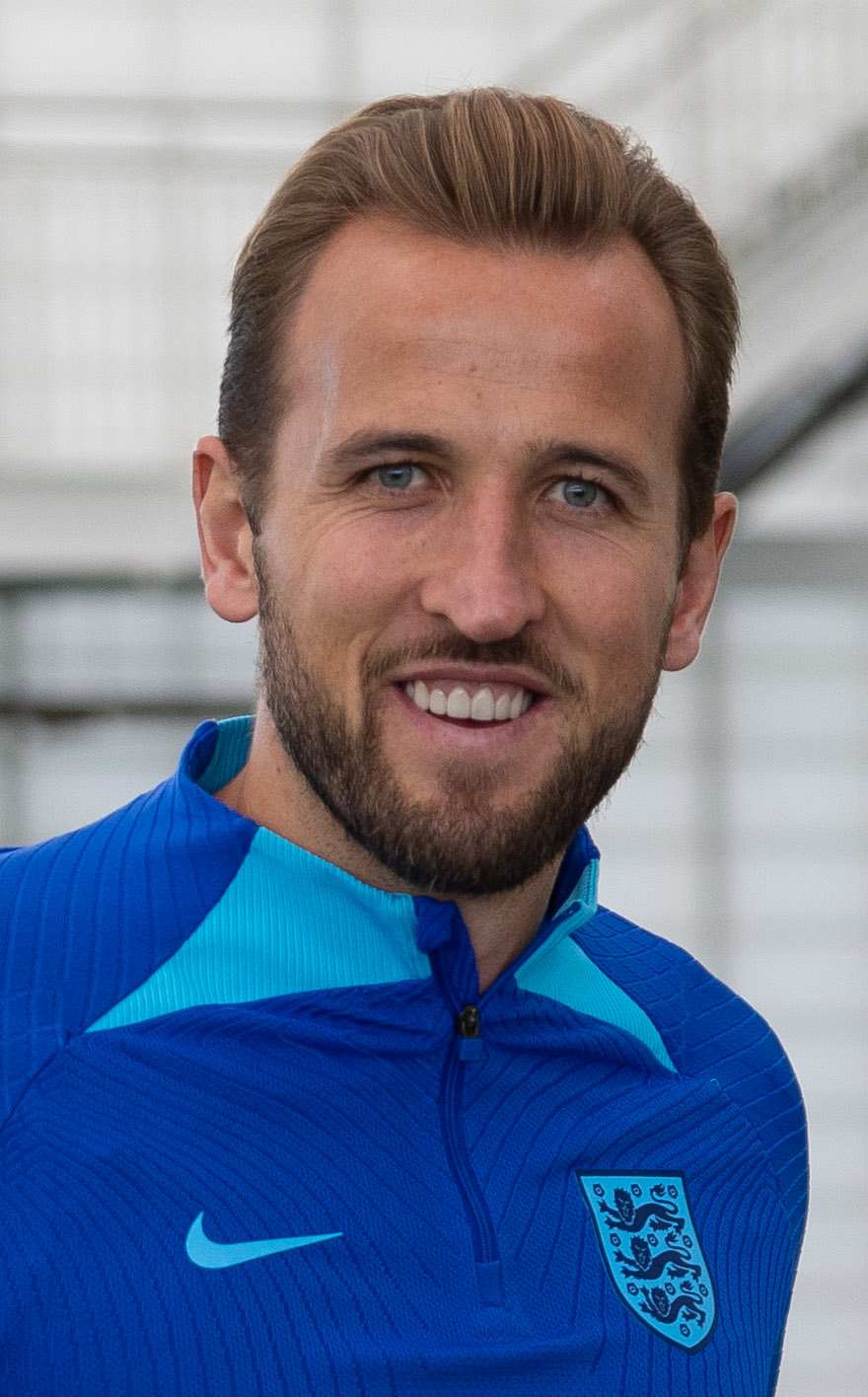
Harry Kane won his third Premier League Golden Boot by scoring 23 goals from 35 matches. He became the first player to also win the Premier League Playmaker of the Season award in the same season, having assisted 14 goals.

Rank	Player	Club	Goals
1	(England) Harry Kane	Tottenham Hotspur	23
2	(Egypt) Mohamed Salah	Liverpool	22
3	(Portugal) Bruno Fernandes	Manchester United	18
4	(England) Patrick Bamford	Leeds United	17
4	(South Korea) Son Heung-min	Tottenham Hotspur	17
6	(England) Dominic Calvert-Lewin	Everton	16
7	(England) Jamie Vardy	Leicester City	15
8	(England) Ollie Watkins	Aston Villa	14
9	(Germany) İlkay Gündoğan	Manchester City	13
9	(France) Alexandre Lacazette	Arsenal	13

==== Hat-tricks ====
Player	For	Against	Result	Date
(Egypt) Mohamed Salah	Liverpool	Leeds United	4–3 (H)	12 September 2020
(England) Dominic Calvert-Lewin	Everton	West Bromwich Albion	5–2 (H)	19 September 2020
(South Korea) Son Heung-min^{4}	Tottenham Hotspur	Southampton	5–2 (A)	20 September 2020
(England) Jamie Vardy	Leicester City	Manchester City	5–2 (A)	27 September 2020
(England) Ollie Watkins	Aston Villa	Liverpool	7–2 (H)	4 October 2020
(England) Patrick Bamford	Leeds United	Aston Villa	3–0 (A)	23 October 2020
(Algeria) Riyad Mahrez	Manchester City	Burnley	5–0 (H)	28 November 2020
(Gabon) Pierre-Emerick Aubameyang	Arsenal	Leeds United	4–2 (H)	14 February 2021
(Nigeria) Kelechi Iheanacho	Leicester City	Sheffield United	5–0 (H)	14 March 2021
(New Zealand) Chris Wood	Burnley	Wolverhampton Wanderers	4–0 (A)	25 April 2021
(Wales) Gareth Bale	Tottenham Hotspur	Sheffield United	4–0 (H)	2 May 2021
(Spain) Ferran Torres	Manchester City	Newcastle United	4–3 (A)	14 May 2021

Notes

^{4} Player scored 4 goals
(H) – Home team
(A) – Away team

=== Clean sheets ===
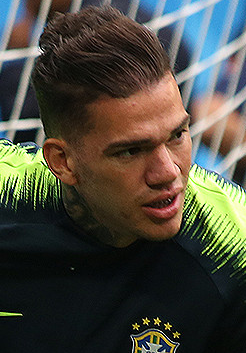
Ederson won a second consecutive Premier League Golden Glove after keeping 19 clean sheets for Manchester City.

Rank	Player	Club	Clean sheets
1	(Brazil) Ederson	Manchester City	19
2	(Senegal) Édouard Mendy	Chelsea	16
3	(Argentina) Emiliano Martínez	Aston Villa	15
4	(France) Hugo Lloris	Tottenham Hotspur	12
5	(Germany) Bernd Leno	Arsenal	11
5	(France) Illan Meslier	Leeds United	11
5	(England) Nick Pope	Burnley	11
5	(Denmark) Kasper Schmeichel	Leicester City	11
9	(Brazil) Alisson	Liverpool	10
9	(Poland) Łukasz Fabiański	West Ham United	10
9	(Portugal) Rui Patrício	Wolverhampton Wanderers	10
9	(England) Jordan Pickford	Everton	10
9	(Spain) Robert Sánchez	Brighton & Hove Albion	10

=== Discipline ===
==== Player ====
- Most yellow cards: 12
  - (Scotland) John McGinn (Aston Villa)
- Most red cards: 2
  - (England) Lewis Dunk (Brighton & Hove Albion)

==== Club ====
- Most yellow cards: 73
  - Sheffield United
- Most red cards: 6
  - Brighton & Hove Albion

== Awards ==
=== Monthly awards ===
Month	Manager of the Month		Player of the Month		Goal of the Month		References
Month	Manager	Club	Player	Club	Player	Club	References
September	(Italy) Carlo Ancelotti	Everton	(England) Dominic Calvert-Lewin	Everton	(England) James Maddison	Leicester City	
October	(Portugal) Nuno Espírito Santo	Wolverhampton Wanderers	(South Korea) Son Heung-min	Tottenham Hotspur	(Argentina) Manuel Lanzini	West Ham United	
November	(Portugal) José Mourinho	Tottenham Hotspur	(Portugal) Bruno Fernandes	Manchester United	(Nigeria) Ola Aina	Fulham	
December	(England) Dean Smith	Aston Villa	(Portugal) Bruno Fernandes	Manchester United	(Ivory Coast) Sébastien Haller	West Ham United	
January	(Spain) Pep Guardiola	Manchester City	(Germany) İlkay Gündoğan	Manchester City	(Egypt) Mohamed Salah	Liverpool	
February	(Spain) Pep Guardiola	Manchester City	(Germany) İlkay Gündoğan	Manchester City	(Portugal) Bruno Fernandes	Manchester United	
March	(Germany) Thomas Tuchel	Chelsea	(Nigeria) Kelechi Iheanacho	Leicester City	(Argentina) Erik Lamela	Tottenham Hotspur	
April	(England) Steve Bruce	Newcastle United	(England) Jesse Lingard	West Ham United	(England) Jesse Lingard	West Ham United	
May	(Germany) Jürgen Klopp	Liverpool	(England) Joe Willock	Newcastle United	(Uruguay) Edinson Cavani	Manchester United	

=== Annual awards ===
Award	Winner	Club
Premier League Manager of the Season	(Spain) Pep Guardiola	Manchester City
Premier League Player of the Season	(Portugal) Rúben Dias	Manchester City
Premier League Young Player of the Season	(England) Phil Foden	Manchester City
Premier League Goal of the Season	(Argentina) Erik Lamela	Tottenham Hotspur
PFA Players' Player of the Year	(Belgium) Kevin De Bruyne	Manchester City
PFA Young Player of the Year	(England) Phil Foden	Manchester City
FWA Footballer of the Year	(Portugal) Rúben Dias	Manchester City
PFA Fans' Player of the Year	(Egypt) Mohamed Salah	Liverpool

PFA Team of the Year
Goalkeeper	(Brazil) Ederson (Manchester City)			
Defenders	(Portugal) João Cancelo (Manchester City)	(Portugal) Rúben Dias (Manchester City)	(England) John Stones (Manchester City)	(England) Luke Shaw (Manchester United)
Midfielders	(Belgium) Kevin De Bruyne (Manchester City)		(Germany) İlkay Gündoğan (Manchester City)	(Portugal) Bruno Fernandes (Manchester United)
Forwards	(Egypt) Mohamed Salah (Liverpool)		(England) Harry Kane (Tottenham Hotspur)	(South Korea) Son Heung-min (Tottenham Hotspur)
