= 1996–97 FA Premier League =

Football season in England

FA Premier League
- Season: 1996–97
- Dates: 17 August 1996 – 11 May 1997
- Champions: Manchester United; 4th Premier League title 11th English title
- Relegated: Sunderland; Middlesbrough; Nottingham Forest
- Champions League: Manchester United; Newcastle United
- Cup Winners' Cup: Chelsea
- UEFA Cup: Arsenal; Liverpool; Aston Villa (through UEFA Respect Fair Play ranking); Leicester City
- Matches: 380
- Goals: 970 (2.55 per match)
- Top goalscorer: Alan Shearer (25 goals)
- Best goalkeeper: Nigel Martyn (19 clean sheets)
- Biggest home win: Everton 7–1 Southampton (16 November 1996); Newcastle United 7–1 Tottenham Hotspur (28 December 1996)
- Biggest away win: Leeds United 0–4 Manchester United (7 September 1996); Nottingham Forest 0–4 Manchester United (26 December 1996); Sunderland 0–4 Tottenham Hotspur (4 March 1997)
- Highest scoring: Southampton 6–3 Manchester United (26 October 1996)
- Longest winning run: 7 games Newcastle United; Wimbledon
- Longest unbeaten run: 16 games Manchester United
- Longest winless run: 16 games Nottingham Forest
- Longest losing run: 6 games Everton
- Highest attendance: 55,314; Manchester United 2–1 Wimbledon (29 January 1997)
- Lowest attendance: 7,979; Wimbledon 2–0 Leeds United (16 April 1997)
- Total attendance: 10,818,380
- Average attendance: 28,469

The 1996–97 FA Premier League (known as the FA Carling Premiership for sponsorship reasons) was the fifth season of the FA Premier League since its formation in 1992. The majority of the season was contested by the reigning champions, Manchester United, along with Newcastle United, Arsenal and Liverpool. The title was eventually won by Manchester United, after Liverpool's and Newcastle's failure to win in their penultimate games of the season; at 75 points it is the lowest points total for a Premier League champion club and lowest since the 3-1-0 points system was introduced in the 1981–82 season.

Middlesbrough, who had high-profile foreign players like Juninho, Emerson, Fabrizio Ravanelli (who scored 31 goals in all competitions), Branco and Gianluca Festa, were relegated on the final day of the season and were on the losing side in both the FA Cup final and the League Cup final. Middlesbrough finished in 19th place, but would have been placed 14th without a three-point deduction imposed for unilaterally postponing a 21 December 1996 fixture at Blackburn Rovers, with the Middlesbrough board making the decision due to the absence of 23 players ill or injured. The club consulted the Premier League prior to calling off the fixture and was told to do 'what they thought best'. To protect the integrity of the game, and avoid fielding a team of untried teenagers including three goalkeepers, Middlesbrough called off the match. The Premier League subsequently absolved itself of all responsibility and deducted the three points. This sanction meant Coventry City, who had been in the top division since 1967, finished in 17th place and avoided relegation. The decision was controversial, and later resurfaced in 2006–07 when West Ham escaped a points deduction and subsequently avoided relegation.

Another relegation place went to Nottingham Forest, who sacked manager Frank Clark in December. Stuart Pearce took over as temporary player-manager, spending three months in charge and winning the January 1997 Manager of the Month award. In March, Pearce quit as manager to be replaced by Dave Bassett, formerly of Crystal Palace. Also relegated, due to a 1–0 defeat to Wimbledon in their last game of the season, was Sunderland, who were leaving Roker Park after 99 years and relocating to the 42,000-seat Stadium of Light on the banks of the River Wear for the start of the 1997–98 season in Division One.

== Teams ==
Twenty teams competed in the league – the top seventeen teams from the previous season and the three teams promoted from the First Division. The promoted teams were Sunderland, Derby County (both teams returning to the top flight after a five-year absence) and Leicester City (immediately returning to the top flight after a season's absence). This was also both Sunderland and Derby County's first season in the Premier League. They replaced Manchester City, Queens Park Rangers and Bolton Wanderers, who were relegated to the First Division after a top flight presence of seven, thirteen and one year respectively.

=== Stadiums and locations ===
Locations of the 1996–97 Premier League teams
Greater London Premier League football clubs

| Team | Location | Stadium | Capacity |
|---|---|---|---|
| Arsenal | London (Highbury) | Arsenal Stadium | 38,419 |
| Aston Villa | Birmingham | Villa Park | 39,399 |
| Blackburn Rovers | Blackburn | Ewood Park | 31,367 |
| Chelsea | London (Fulham) | Stamford Bridge | 36,000 |
| Coventry City | Coventry | Highfield Road | 23,489 |
| Derby County | Derby | Baseball Ground (Note: This was Derby County's last season at Baseball Ground as they were scheduled to relocate to the Pride Park Stadium at the end of the season.) | 18,300 |
| Everton | Liverpool (Walton) | Goodison Park | 40,157 |
| Leeds United | Leeds | Elland Road | 40,204 |
| Leicester City | Leicester | Filbert Street | 22,000 |
| Liverpool | Liverpool (Anfield) | Anfield | 42,730 |
| Manchester United | Manchester | Old Trafford | 55,314 |
| Middlesbrough | Middlesbrough | Riverside Stadium | 30,000 |
| Newcastle United | Newcastle upon Tyne | St James' Park | 36,649 |
| Nottingham Forest | West Bridgford | City Ground | 30,539 |
| Sheffield Wednesday | Sheffield | Hillsborough Stadium | 39,859 |
| Southampton | Southampton | The Dell | 15,200 |
| Sunderland | Sunderland | Roker Park (Note: This was Sunderland's last season at Roker Park as they were scheduled to relocate to the Stadium of Light at the end of the season.) | 22,500 |
| Tottenham Hotspur | London (Tottenham) | White Hart Lane | 36,230 |
| West Ham United | London (Upton Park) | Boleyn Ground | 28,000 |
| Wimbledon | London (Selhurst) | Selhurst Park (Note: Due to Wimbledon lacking a home stadium, they played their home games at Selhurst Park, which is the home stadium of Crystal Palace.) | 26,309 |

=== Personnel and kits ===
(as of 11 May 1997)

| Team | Manager | Captain | Kit manufacturer | Shirt sponsor |
|---|---|---|---|---|
| Arsenal | (France) Arsène Wenger | (England) Tony Adams | Nike | JVC |
| Aston Villa | (England) Brian Little | (Republic of Ireland) Andy Townsend | Reebok | AST Research |
| Blackburn Rovers | (England) Tony Parkes | (England) Tim Sherwood | Asics | CIS |
| Chelsea | (Netherlands) Ruud Gullit | (England) Dennis Wise | Umbro | Coors |
| Coventry City | (Scotland) Gordon Strachan | (Scotland) Gary McAllister | Le Coq Sportif | Peugeot |
| Derby County | (England) Jim Smith | (Croatia) Igor Štimac | Puma | Puma |
| Everton | (England) Dave Watson (caretaker) | (England) Dave Watson | Umbro | Danka |
| Leeds United | (Scotland) George Graham | (South Africa) Lucas Radebe | Puma | Packard Bell |
| Leicester City | (Northern Ireland) Martin O'Neill | (England) Steve Walsh | Fox Leisure | Walkers |
| Liverpool | (England) Roy Evans | (England) John Barnes | Reebok | Carlsberg |
| Manchester United | (Scotland) Alex Ferguson | (France) Eric Cantona | Umbro | Sharp |
| Middlesbrough | (England) Bryan Robson | (England) Nigel Pearson | Erreà | Cellnet |
| Newcastle United | (Scotland) Kenny Dalglish | (England) Peter Beardsley | Adidas | Newcastle Brown Ale |
| Nottingham Forest | (England) Dave Bassett | (England) Stuart Pearce | Umbro | Labatt's |
| Sheffield Wednesday | (England) David Pleat | (England) Peter Atherton | Puma | Sanderson |
| Southampton | (Scotland) Graeme Souness | (England) Matt Le Tissier | Pony | Sanderson |
| Sunderland | (England) Peter Reid | (England) Kevin Ball | Avec | Vaux Breweries |
| Tottenham Hotspur | (England) Gerry Francis | (England) Gary Mabbutt | Pony | Hewlett-Packard |
| West Ham United | (England) Harry Redknapp | (England) Julian Dicks | Pony | Dagenham Motors |
| Wimbledon | (Republic of Ireland) Joe Kinnear | (Wales) Vinnie Jones | Lotto | Elonex |

=== Managerial changes ===
| Team | Outgoing manager | Manner of departure | Date of vacancy | Position in table | Incoming manager | Date of appointment |
|---|---|---|---|---|---|---|
| Chelsea | (England) Glenn Hoddle | Signed by England | 10 May 1996 | Pre-season | (Netherlands) Ruud Gullit | 10 May 1996 |
| Southampton | (England) Dave Merrington | Sacked | 14 June 1996 | Pre-season | (Scotland) Graeme Souness | 3 July 1996 |
| Arsenal | (Scotland) Bruce Rioch | Sacked | 12 August 1996 | Pre-season | (Scotland) Stewart Houston (caretaker) | 12 August 1996 |
| Leeds United | (England) Howard Wilkinson | Sacked | 10 September 1996 | 9th | (Scotland) George Graham | 10 September 1996 |
| Arsenal | (Scotland) Stewart Houston | Signed by Queens Park Rangers | 16 September 1996 | 7th | (Northern Ireland) Pat Rice (caretaker) | 16 September 1996 |
| Arsenal | (Northern Ireland) Pat Rice | End of caretaker spell | 30 September 1996 | 3rd | (France) Arsène Wenger | 30 September 1996 |
| Blackburn Rovers | (England) Ray Harford | Resigned | 25 October 1996 | 20th | (England) Tony Parkes (caretaker) | 25 October 1996 |
| Coventry City | (England) Ron Atkinson | Promoted to director of football | 5 November 1996 | 18th | (Scotland) Gordon Strachan | 5 November 1996 |
| Nottingham Forest | (England) Frank Clark | Resigned | 19 December 1996 | 20th | (England) Stuart Pearce (caretaker) | 20 December 1996 |
| Newcastle United | (England) Kevin Keegan | Resigned | 8 January 1997 | 4th | (England) Terry McDermott (caretaker) | 8 January 1997 |
| Newcastle United | (England) Terry McDermott | End of caretaker spell | 14 January 1997 | 4th | (Scotland) Kenny Dalglish | 14 January 1997 |
| Everton | (England) Joe Royle | Resigned | 27 March 1997 | 13th | (England) Dave Watson (caretaker) | 1 April 1997 |

== League table ==
| Pos | Team | Pld | W | D | L | GF | GA | GD | Pts | Qualification or relegation |
|---|---|---|---|---|---|---|---|---|---|---|
| 1 | Manchester United (C) | 38 | 21 | 12 | 5 | 76 | 44 | +32 | 75 | Qualification for the Champions League group stage |
| 2 | Newcastle United | 38 | 19 | 11 | 8 | 73 | 40 | +33 | 68 | Qualification for the Champions League second qualifying round |
| 3 | Arsenal | 38 | 19 | 11 | 8 | 62 | 32 | +30 | 68 | Qualification for the UEFA Cup first round (Note: Aston Villa was rewarded entry to the UEFA Cup through UEFA Fair Play ranking.) |
| 4 | Liverpool | 38 | 19 | 11 | 8 | 62 | 37 | +25 | 68 | Qualification for the UEFA Cup first round |
| 5 | Aston Villa | 38 | 17 | 10 | 11 | 47 | 34 | +13 | 61 | Qualification for the UEFA Cup first round |
| 6 | Chelsea | 38 | 16 | 11 | 11 | 58 | 55 | +3 | 59 | Qualification for the Cup Winners' Cup first round (Note: Chelsea qualified for the Cup Winners' Cup as FA Cup winners.) |
| 7 | Sheffield Wednesday | 38 | 14 | 15 | 9 | 50 | 51 | −1 | 57 | |
| 8 | Wimbledon | 38 | 15 | 11 | 12 | 49 | 46 | +3 | 56 | |
| 9 | Leicester City | 38 | 12 | 11 | 15 | 46 | 54 | −8 | 47 | Qualification for the UEFA Cup first round (Note: Leicester City qualified for the UEFA Cup as League Cup winners.) |
| 10 | Tottenham Hotspur | 38 | 13 | 7 | 18 | 44 | 51 | −7 | 46 | |
| 11 | Leeds United | 38 | 11 | 13 | 14 | 28 | 38 | −10 | 46 | |
| 12 | Derby County | 38 | 11 | 13 | 14 | 45 | 58 | −13 | 46 | |
| 13 | Blackburn Rovers | 38 | 9 | 15 | 14 | 42 | 43 | −1 | 42 | |
| 14 | West Ham United | 38 | 10 | 12 | 16 | 39 | 48 | −9 | 42 | |
| 15 | Everton | 38 | 10 | 12 | 16 | 44 | 57 | −13 | 42 | |
| 16 | Southampton | 38 | 10 | 11 | 17 | 50 | 56 | −6 | 41 | |
| 17 | Coventry City | 38 | 9 | 14 | 15 | 38 | 54 | −16 | 41 | |
| 18 | Sunderland (R) | 38 | 10 | 10 | 18 | 35 | 53 | −18 | 40 | Relegation to the Football League First Division |
| 19 | Middlesbrough (R) | 38 | 10 | 12 | 16 | 51 | 60 | −9 | 39 (Note: Middlesbrough were docked three points for failing to fulfill their original fixture at Blackburn Rovers on 21 December 1996.) | Relegation to the Football League First Division |
| 20 | Nottingham Forest (R) | 38 | 6 | 16 | 16 | 31 | 59 | −28 | 34 | Relegation to the Football League First Division |

Source: Premier League
Rules for classification: 1) points; 2) goal difference; 3) number of goals scored.
(C) Champions; (R) Relegated

== Results ==
| Home \ Away | ARS | AVL | BLB | CHE | COV | DER | EVE | LEE | LEI | LIV | MUN | MID | NEW | NFO | SHW | SOU | SUN | TOT | WHU | WIM |
|---|---|---|---|---|---|---|---|---|---|---|---|---|---|---|---|---|---|---|---|---|
| Arsenal | | 2–2 | 1–1 | 3–3 | 0–0 | 2–2 | 3–1 | 3–0 | 2–0 | 1–2 | 1–2 | 2–0 | 0–1 | 2–0 | 4–1 | 3–1 | 2–0 | 3–1 | 2–0 | 0–1 |
| Aston Villa | 2–2 | | 1–0 | 0–2 | 2–1 | 2–0 | 3–1 | 2–0 | 1–3 | 1–0 | 0–0 | 1–0 | 2–2 | 2–0 | 0–1 | 1–0 | 1–0 | 1–1 | 0–0 | 5–0 |
| Blackburn Rovers | 0–2 | 0–2 | | 1–1 | 4–0 | 1–2 | 1–1 | 0–1 | 2–4 | 3–0 | 2–3 | 0–0 | 1–0 | 1–1 | 4–1 | 2–1 | 1–0 | 0–2 | 2–1 | 3–1 |
| Chelsea | 0–3 | 1–1 | 1–1 | | 2–0 | 3–1 | 2–2 | 0–0 | 2–1 | 1–0 | 1–1 | 1–0 | 1–1 | 1–1 | 2–2 | 1–0 | 6–2 | 3–1 | 3–1 | 2–4 |
| Coventry City | 1–1 | 1–2 | 0–0 | 3–1 | | 1–2 | 0–0 | 2–1 | 0–0 | 0–1 | 0–2 | 3–0 | 2–1 | 0–3 | 0–0 | 1–1 | 2–2 | 1–2 | 1–3 | 1–1 |
| Derby County | 1–3 | 2–1 | 0–0 | 3–2 | 2–1 | | 0–1 | 3–3 | 2–0 | 0–1 | 1–1 | 2–1 | 0–1 | 0–0 | 2–2 | 1–1 | 1–0 | 4–2 | 1–0 | 0–2 |
| Everton | 0–2 | 0–1 | 0–2 | 1–2 | 1–1 | 1–0 | | 0–0 | 1–1 | 1–1 | 0–2 | 1–2 | 2–0 | 2–0 | 2–0 | 7–1 | 1–3 | 1–0 | 2–1 | 1–3 |
| Leeds United | 0–0 | 0–0 | 0–0 | 2–0 | 1–3 | 0–0 | 1–0 | | 3–0 | 0–2 | 0–4 | 1–1 | 0–1 | 2–0 | 0–2 | 0–0 | 3–0 | 0–0 | 1–0 | 1–0 |
| Leicester City | 0–2 | 1–0 | 1–1 | 1–3 | 0–2 | 4–2 | 1–2 | 1–0 | | 0–3 | 2–2 | 1–3 | 2–0 | 2–2 | 1–0 | 2–1 | 1–1 | 1–1 | 0–1 | 1–0 |
| Liverpool | 2–0 | 3–0 | 0–0 | 5–1 | 1–2 | 2–1 | 1–1 | 4–0 | 1–1 | | 1–3 | 5–1 | 4–3 | 4–2 | 0–1 | 2–1 | 0–0 | 2–1 | 0–0 | 1–1 |
| Manchester United | 1–0 | 0–0 | 2–2 | 1–2 | 3–1 | 2–3 | 2–2 | 1–0 | 3–1 | 1–0 | | 3–3 | 0–0 | 4–1 | 2–0 | 2–1 | 5–0 | 2–0 | 2–0 | 2–1 |
| Middlesbrough | 0–2 | 3–2 | 2–1 | 1–0 | 4–0 | 6–1 | 4–2 | 0–0 | 0–2 | 3–3 | 2–2 | | 0–1 | 1–1 | 4–2 | 0–1 | 0–1 | 0–3 | 4–1 | 0–0 |
| Newcastle United | 1–2 | 4–3 | 2–1 | 3–1 | 4–0 | 3–1 | 4–1 | 3–0 | 4–3 | 1–1 | 5–0 | 3–1 | | 5–0 | 1–2 | 0–1 | 1–1 | 7–1 | 1–1 | 2–0 |
| Nottingham Forest | 2–1 | 0–0 | 2–2 | 2–0 | 0–1 | 1–1 | 0–1 | 1–1 | 0–0 | 1–1 | 0–4 | 1–1 | 0–0 | | 0–3 | 1–3 | 1–4 | 2–1 | 0–2 | 1–1 |
| Sheffield Wednesday | 0–0 | 2–1 | 1–1 | 0–2 | 0–0 | 0–0 | 2–1 | 2–2 | 2–1 | 1–1 | 1–1 | 3–1 | 1–1 | 2–0 | | 1–1 | 2–1 | 2–1 | 0–0 | 3–1 |
| Southampton | 0–2 | 0–1 | 2–0 | 0–0 | 2–2 | 3–1 | 2–2 | 0–2 | 2–2 | 0–1 | 6–3 | 4–0 | 2–2 | 2–2 | 2–3 | | 3–0 | 0–1 | 2–0 | 0–0 |
| Sunderland | 1–0 | 1–0 | 0–0 | 3–0 | 1–0 | 2–0 | 3–0 | 0–1 | 0–0 | 1–2 | 2–1 | 2–2 | 1–2 | 1–1 | 1–1 | 0–1 | | 0–4 | 0–0 | 1–3 |
| Tottenham Hotspur | 0–0 | 1–0 | 2–1 | 1–2 | 1–2 | 1–1 | 0–0 | 1–0 | 1–2 | 0–2 | 1–2 | 1–0 | 1–2 | 0–1 | 1–1 | 3–1 | 2–0 | | 1–0 | 1–0 |
| West Ham United | 1–2 | 0–2 | 2–1 | 3–2 | 1–1 | 1–1 | 2–2 | 0–2 | 1–0 | 1–2 | 2–2 | 0–0 | 0–0 | 0–1 | 5–1 | 2–1 | 2–0 | 4–3 | | 0–2 |
| Wimbledon | 2–2 | 0–2 | 1–0 | 0–1 | 2–2 | 1–1 | 4–0 | 2–0 | 1–3 | 2–1 | 0–3 | 1–1 | 1–1 | 1–0 | 4–2 | 3–1 | 1–0 | 1–0 | 1–1 | |

Source: Premier League
Legend: Blue = home team win; Yellow = draw; Red = away team win.

== Season statistics ==
=== Scoring ===
==== Top scorers ====
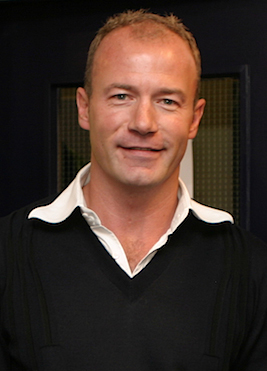
Newcastle's Alan Shearer was the top scorer for the third and final time, with 25 goals.

| Rank | Player | Club | Goals |
|---|---|---|---|
| 1 | (England) Alan Shearer | Newcastle United | 25 |
| 2 | (England) Ian Wright | Arsenal | 23 |
| 3 | (England) Robbie Fowler | Liverpool | 18 |
| 3 | (Norway) Ole Gunnar Solskjær | Manchester United | 18 |
| 5 | (Trinidad and Tobago) Dwight Yorke | Aston Villa | 17 |
| 6 | (England) Les Ferdinand | Newcastle United | 16 |
| 6 | (Italy) Fabrizio Ravanelli | Middlesbrough | 16 |
| 8 | (England) Dion Dublin | Coventry City | 13 |
| 8 | (England) Matt Le Tissier | Southampton | 13 |
| 10 | (Netherlands) Dennis Bergkamp | Arsenal | 12 |
| 10 | (England) Steve Claridge | Leicester City | 12 |
| 10 | (England) Stan Collymore | Liverpool | 12 |
| 10 | (Brazil) Juninho | Middlesbrough | 12 |

==== Hat-tricks ====
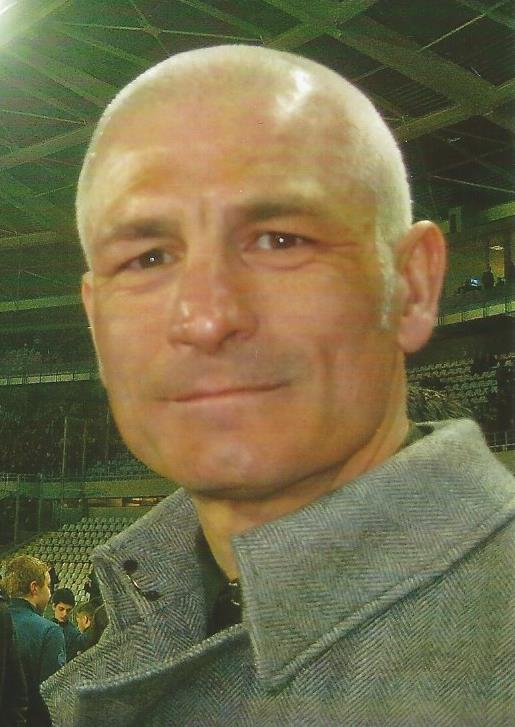
Middlesbrough's Fabrizio Ravanelli was the only player to score a hat-trick more than once during the 1996–97 season.

| Player | For | Against | Result | Date | Ref |
|---|---|---|---|---|---|
| (England) Kevin Campbell | Nottingham Forest | Coventry City | 3–0 (A) | 17 August 1996 | |
| (Italy) Fabrizio Ravanelli | Middlesbrough | Liverpool | 3–3 (H) | 17 August 1996 | |
| (England) Ian Wright | Arsenal | Sheffield Wednesday | 4–1 (H) | 16 September 1996 | |
| (Trinidad and Tobago) Dwight Yorke^{L} | Aston Villa | Newcastle United | 3–4 (A) | 30 September 1996 | |
| (Wales) Gary Speed | Everton | Southampton | 7–1 (H) | 16 November 1996 | |
| (England) Robbie Fowler^{4} | Liverpool | Middlesbrough | 5–1 (H) | 14 December 1996 | |
| (England) Alan Shearer | Newcastle United | Leicester City | 4–3 (H) | 2 February 1997 | |
| (England) Ian Marshall | Leicester City | Derby County | 4–2 (H) | 22 February 1997 | |
| (Norway) Steffen Iversen | Tottenham Hotspur | Sunderland | 4–0 (A) | 4 March 1997 | |
| (Italy) Fabrizio Ravanelli | Middlesbrough | Derby County | 6–1 (H) | 5 March 1997 | |
| (Scotland) Kevin Gallacher | Blackburn Rovers | Wimbledon | 3–1 (H) | 15 March 1997 | |
| (England) Paul Kitson | West Ham United | Sheffield Wednesday | 5–1 (H) | 3 May 1997 | |

Note: ^{4} Player scored 4 goals; ^{L} Player finished on the losing side; (H) – Home; (A) – Away

==== Top assists ====
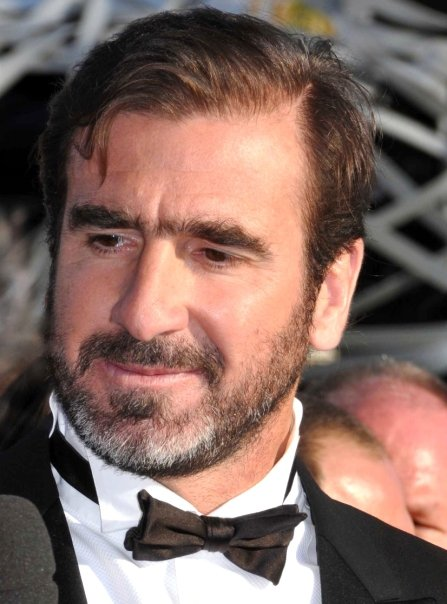
Manchester United's Eric Cantona assisted 12 goals for the club in the 1996–97 Premier League season.

| Rank | Player | Club | Assists |
|---|---|---|---|
| 1 | (France) Eric Cantona | Manchester United | 12 |
| 2 | (England) Neal Ardley | Wimbledon | 11 |
| 3 | (Netherlands) Dennis Bergkamp | Arsenal | 9 |
| 3 | (England) Andy Hinchcliffe | Everton | 9 |
| 3 | (Scotland) Gary McAllister | Coventry City | 9 |
| 3 | (Italy) Gianfranco Zola | Chelsea | 9 |
| 7 | (England) Nick Barmby | Everton | 8 |
| 7 | (England) David Beckham | Manchester United | 8 |
| 7 | (Norway) Stig Inge Bjørnebye | Liverpool | 8 |
| 7 | (England) Les Ferdinand | Newcastle United | 8 |

== Awards ==
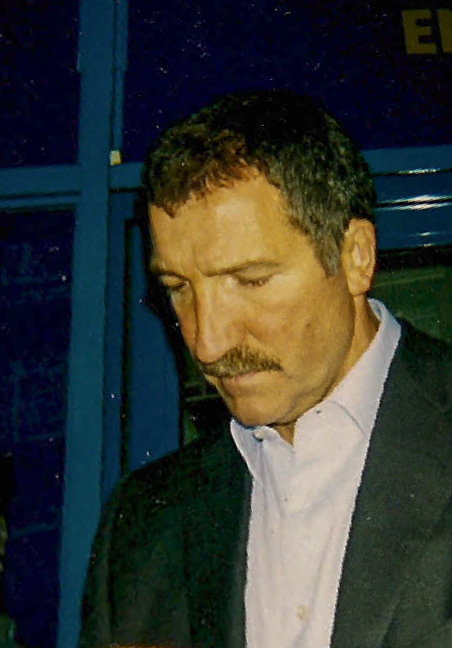
Southampton's Graeme Souness was the only manager to win the Manager of the Month award more than once.

=== Monthly awards ===
| Month | Manager of the Month | | Player of the Month | |
| Month | Manager | Club | Player | Club |
|---|---|---|---|---|
| August | (England) David Pleat | Sheffield Wednesday | (England) David Beckham | Manchester United |
| September | (Republic of Ireland) Joe Kinnear | Wimbledon | (Czech Republic) Patrik Berger | Liverpool |
| October | (Scotland) Graeme Souness | Southampton | (England) Matt Le Tissier | Southampton |
| November | (England) Jim Smith | Derby County | (England) Ian Wright | Arsenal |
| December | (Scotland) Gordon Strachan | Coventry City | (Italy) Gianfranco Zola | Chelsea |
| January | (England) Stuart Pearce | Nottingham Forest | (England) Tim Flowers | Blackburn Rovers |
| February | (Scotland) Alex Ferguson | Manchester United | (England) (Note: Earle was born in England, but made his debut for Jamaica in September 1997.) Robbie Earle | Wimbledon |
| March | (England) Bryan Robson | Middlesbrough | (Brazil) Juninho | Middlesbrough |
| April | (Scotland) Graeme Souness | Southampton | (England) (Note: Evans was born in England, but made his debut for the Republic of Ireland in October 1997.) Mickey Evans | Southampton |

=== Annual awards ===
| Award | Winner | Club |
|---|---|---|
| Premier League Manager of the Season | (Scotland) Alex Ferguson | Manchester United |
| Premier League Player of the Season | (Brazil) Juninho | Middlesbrough |
| PFA Players' Player of the Year | (England) Alan Shearer | Newcastle United |
| PFA Young Player of the Year | (England) David Beckham | Manchester United |
| FWA Footballer of the Year | (Italy) Gianfranco Zola | Chelsea |

PFA Team of the Year
| Goalkeeper | (England) David Seaman (Arsenal) | | | |
| Defence | (England) Gary Neville (Manchester United) | (England) Tony Adams (Arsenal) | (England) Mark Wright (Liverpool) | (Norway) Stig Inge Bjørnebye (Liverpool) |
| Midfield | (England) David Beckham (Manchester United) | (Republic of Ireland) Roy Keane (Manchester United) | (England) David Batty (Newcastle United) | (England) Steve McManaman (Liverpool) |
| Attack | (England) Alan Shearer (Newcastle United) | | (England) Ian Wright (Arsenal) | |

== Attendances ==
Manchester United drew the highest average home attendance in the 1996-97 edition of the Premier League.

| # | Football club | Home games | Average attendance |
|---|---|---|---|
| 1 | Manchester United | 19 | 55,081 |
| 2 | Liverpool FC | 19 | 39,777 |
| 3 | Arsenal FC | 19 | 37,821 |
| 4 | Newcastle United | 19 | 36,467 |
| 5 | Everton FC | 19 | 36,188 |
| 6 | Aston Villa | 19 | 36,027 |
| 7 | Leeds United | 19 | 32,118 |
| 8 | Tottenham Hotspur | 19 | 31,067 |
| 9 | Middlesbrough FC | 19 | 29,871 |
| 10 | Chelsea FC | 19 | 27,617 |
| 11 | Sheffield Wednesday | 19 | 25,714 |
| 12 | Blackburn Rovers | 19 | 24,947 |
| 13 | Nottingham Forest | 19 | 24,587 |
| 14 | West Ham United | 19 | 23,209 |
| 15 | Sunderland AFC | 19 | 20,974 |
| 16 | Leicester City | 19 | 20,184 |
| 17 | Coventry City | 19 | 19,608 |
| 18 | Derby County | 19 | 17,889 |
| 19 | Wimbledon FC | 19 | 15,139 |
| 20 | Southampton FC | 19 | 15,105 |

== See also ==
- 1996–97 in English football
