= 1995–96 FA Premier League =

Football season in England

FA Premier League
- Season: 1995–96
- Dates: 19 August 1995 – 5 May 1996
- Champions: Manchester United; 3rd Premier League title 10th English title
- Relegated: Manchester City; Queens Park Rangers; Bolton Wanderers
- Champions League: Manchester United
- Cup Winners' Cup: Liverpool
- UEFA Cup: Newcastle United; Aston Villa; Arsenal
- Matches: 380
- Goals: 988 (2.6 per match)
- Top goalscorer: Alan Shearer (31 goals)
- Best goalkeeper: Peter Schmeichel (18 clean sheets)
- Biggest home win: Blackburn Rovers 7–0 Nottingham Forest (18 November 1995)
- Biggest away win: Bolton Wanderers 0–6 Manchester United (25 February 1996)
- Highest scoring: Sheffield Wednesday 6–2 Leeds United (16 December 1995)
- Longest winning run: 6 games Manchester United
- Longest unbeaten run: 15 games Liverpool
- Longest winless run: 14 games Coventry City; Wimbledon
- Longest losing run: 8 games Manchester City; Middlesbrough
- Highest attendance: 53,926; Manchester United 5–0 Nottingham Forest (28 April 1996)
- Lowest attendance: 6,352; Wimbledon 2–2 Sheffield Wednesday (30 August 1995)
- Total attendance: 10,472,882
- Average attendance: 27,560

The 1995–96 FA Premier League (known as the FA Carling Premiership for sponsorship reasons) was the fourth season of the competition, since its formation in 1992. Due to the decision to reduce the number of clubs in the FA Premier League from 22 to 20, only two clubs, Middlesbrough and Bolton Wanderers, were promoted instead of the usual three.

Manchester United won the Premier League and qualified for the UEFA Champions League, while Arsenal, Aston Villa, and Newcastle United qualified for the UEFA Cup. Liverpool also qualified for the UEFA Cup Winners' Cup as runners-up of the FA Cup which was won by Manchester United.

== Summary ==
Liverpool and Aston Villa emerged as possible title contenders early in the season, while Middlesbrough's early promise saw them occupy fourth place in late October. However, an injury crisis saw their league form slump, leading them up to 12th-place. Most of the campaign was a two-horse race between Manchester United and Newcastle United. The two sides played on 27 December, with Newcastle 10 points ahead in the league. A 2–0 home win for Manchester United cut the gap to seven points, and two days later they beat Queens Park Rangers 2–1 to reduce the gap to just four points. Nevertheless, a 4–1 defeat at Tottenham on New Year's Day and a 0–0 draw with Aston Villa allowed Newcastle to establish a 12-point lead in January.

Manchester United and Newcastle met again in early March, by which time the gap had been cut to four points. A second half goal by Eric Cantona gave Manchester United a 1–0 away win and cut the gap to a single point. With one game left of the season, Manchester United led the Premier League by two points, having taken lead of the league halfway through March and stayed on top ever since. In case of the two clubs being tied for first place, the Premier League made preliminary preparations for a championship play-off match at Wembley. For Newcastle to win their first title since 1927, they had to win against Tottenham and hope that their north-eastern rivals Middlesbrough defeated Alex Ferguson's men. But the Premier League title went to Old Trafford as Manchester United won 3–0 and Newcastle could only manage a 1–1 draw with Tottenham.

Despite the arrival of Dennis Bergkamp, Arsenal never looked like serious title challengers. Their best chance of success coming in the League Cup, where they reached the semi-finals, was lost on away goals to Aston Villa. However, the North London side still qualified for the UEFA Cup by finishing fifth.

Aston Villa won the Coca-Cola sponsored League Cup competition this season, beating Leeds United 3–0 at Wembley.

Title holders, Blackburn, recorded the lowest ever finish by a Premier League title-holder by finishing 7th. This record was matched by Manchester United in 2013–14 and broken by Chelsea in 2015–16 and again by Leicester City in 2016–17. However, Rovers striker Alan Shearer was still the league’s top scorer with 31 goals.

Six days after clinching their third league title in four seasons, Manchester United became the first team to complete a second league championship and FA Cup double when a Cantona goal gave them a 1–0 win over Liverpool in the FA Cup final.

Fourth place Aston Villa lifted the League Cup for a joint record fifth time, securing a UEFA Cup place for the third time in four seasons.

The Premier League relegation places went to Bolton Wanderers, Queens Park Rangers, and Manchester City. Bolton had spent most of their first Premier League season bottom of the table, and an improvement in form was not enough to save the Burnden Park side from an immediate return to Division One. They went down on the season’s penultimate weekend, on the same day that QPR’s 3-0 win over London rivals West Ham came too late to save the top flight place they had held since 1983. Manchester City failed to beat Liverpool on the final day of the season, consigning them to the final relegation place on goal difference behind Southampton and Coventry City.

=== English performance in European competition ===
Blackburn Rovers, the 1994–95 Premier League champions, finished bottom of their group in the UEFA Champions League. Manchester United were knocked out of the UEFA Cup in the first round, with Liverpool and Leeds United both being knocked out at the second round. Everton were beaten in the second round of the UEFA Cup Winners' Cup. The only English team still in European competition after Christmas were Nottingham Forest, who reached the quarter-finals of the UEFA Cup.

Tottenham Hotspur, Wimbledon and Sheffield Wednesday were invited to the revamped Intertoto Cup, which became under the auspices of UEFA. All three failed to progress from the group stage but due to Tottenham and Wimbledon fielding under-strength teams, they both received a one-year suspension from UEFA. The bans were lifted upon appeal however, the Football Association were forced to forfeit their Fair Play berth for the 1996–97 UEFA Cup to go to the best-placed team not qualified for Europe, which were Everton.

== Teams ==
Twenty teams competed in the league – the top eighteen teams from the previous season and the two teams promoted from the First Division. The promoted teams were Middlesbrough and Bolton Wanderers, returning to the top flight after two and fifteen years respectively. This was also Bolton Wanderers' first season in the Premier League. They replaced Crystal Palace, Norwich City, Leicester City and Ipswich Town, who were relegated to the First Division after their top flight spells of one, nine, one and three years respectively. This was the first season in which the league was contested by twenty teams as opposed to previous seasons which were contested by twenty-two teams.

=== Stadiums and locations ===
Locations of the 1995–96 Premier League teams
Greater London Premier League football clubs
Greater Manchester Premier League football clubs

Team	Location	Stadium	Capacity
Arsenal	London (Highbury)	Arsenal Stadium	38,419
Aston Villa	Birmingham	Villa Park	39,399
Blackburn Rovers	Blackburn	Ewood Park	31,367
Bolton Wanderers	Bolton	Burnden Park	25,000
Chelsea	London (Fulham)	Stamford Bridge	36,000
Coventry City	Coventry	Highfield Road	23,489
Everton	Liverpool (Walton)	Goodison Park	40,157
Leeds United	Leeds	Elland Road	40,204
Liverpool	Liverpool (Anfield)	Anfield	42,730
Manchester City	Manchester (Moss Side)	Maine Road	35,150
Manchester United	Manchester (Old Trafford)	Old Trafford	55,314
Middlesbrough	Middlesbrough	Riverside Stadium	30,000
Newcastle United	Newcastle upon Tyne	St James' Park	36,649
Nottingham Forest	West Bridgford	City Ground	30,539
Queens Park Rangers	London (Shepherd's Bush)	Loftus Road	18,439
Sheffield Wednesday	Sheffield	Hillsborough Stadium	39,859
Southampton	Southampton	The Dell	15,200
Tottenham Hotspur	London (Tottenham)	White Hart Lane	36,230
West Ham United	London (Upton Park)	Boleyn Ground	28,000
Wimbledon	London (Selhurst)	Selhurst Park (Note: Due to Wimbledon lacking a home stadium, they played their home games at Selhurst Park, which is the home stadium of Crystal Palace.)	26,309

=== Personnel and kits ===
(as of 5 May 1996)

Team	Manager	Captain	Kit manufacturer	Shirt sponsor
Arsenal	(Scotland) Bruce Rioch	(England) Tony Adams	Nike	JVC
Aston Villa	(England) Brian Little	(Republic of Ireland) Andy Townsend	Reebok	AST Research
Blackburn Rovers	(England) Ray Harford	(England) Tim Sherwood	Asics	McEwan's Lager
Bolton Wanderers	(England) Colin Todd	(England) Alan Stubbs	Reebok	Reebok
Chelsea	(England) Glenn Hoddle	(England) Dennis Wise	Umbro	Coors
Coventry City	(England) Ron Atkinson	(England) Brian Borrows	Pony	Peugeot
Everton	(England) Joe Royle	(England) Dave Watson	Umbro	Danka
Leeds United	(England) Howard Wilkinson	(Scotland) Gary McAllister	Asics	Thistle Hotels
Liverpool	(England) Roy Evans	(Wales) Ian Rush	Adidas	Carlsberg
Manchester City	(England) Alan Ball	(England) Keith Curle	Umbro	Brother
Manchester United	(Scotland) Alex Ferguson	(England) Steve Bruce	Umbro	Sharp
Middlesbrough	(England) Bryan Robson	(England) Nigel Pearson	Erreà	Cellnet
Newcastle United	(England) Kevin Keegan	(England) Peter Beardsley	Adidas	Newcastle Brown Ale
Nottingham Forest	(England) Frank Clark	(England) Stuart Pearce	Umbro	Labatt's
Queens Park Rangers	(England) Ray Wilkins	(England) David Bardsley	View From	Compaq
Sheffield Wednesday	(England) David Pleat	(England) Peter Atherton	Puma	Sanderson
Southampton	(England) Dave Merrington	(England) Matt Le Tissier	Pony	Sanderson
Tottenham Hotspur	(England) Gerry Francis	(England) Gary Mabbutt	Pony	Hewlett-Packard
West Ham United	(England) Harry Redknapp	(England) Steve Potts	Pony	Dagenham Motors
Wimbledon	(Republic of Ireland) Joe Kinnear	(Wales) Vinnie Jones	Core	Elonex

=== Managerial changes ===
Team	Outgoing manager	Manner of departure	Date of vacancy	Position in table	Incoming manager	Date of appointment
Manchester City	(England) Brian Horton	Sacked	16 May 1995	Pre-season	(England) Alan Ball	2 July 1995
Sheffield Wednesday	(England) Trevor Francis	Sacked	20 May 1995	Pre-season	(England) David Pleat	14 June 1995
Arsenal	(Scotland) Stewart Houston	End of caretaker spell	8 June 1995	Pre-season	(Scotland) Bruce Rioch	8 June 1995
Bolton Wanderers	(Scotland) Bruce Rioch	Signed by Arsenal	8 June 1995	Pre-season	(England) Roy McFarland (England) Colin Todd (Note: McFarland and Todd were co-managers.)	20 June 1995
Blackburn Rovers	(Scotland) Kenny Dalglish	Promoted to Director of Football	25 June 1995	Pre-season	(England) Ray Harford	25 June 1995
Southampton	(England) Alan Ball	Signed by Manchester City	2 July 1995	Pre-season	(England) David Merrington	14 July 1995
Bolton Wanderers	(England) Roy McFarland	Sacked	2 January 1996	20th	(England) Colin Todd (Note: Assumed full managerial duties.)	2 January 1996

== League table ==
Pos	Team	Pld	W	D	L	GF	GA	GD	Pts	Qualification or relegation
1	Manchester United (C)	38	25	7	6	73	35	+38	82	Qualification for the Champions League group stage
2	Newcastle United	38	24	6	8	66	37	+29	78	Qualification for the UEFA Cup first round
3	Liverpool	38	20	11	7	70	34	+36	71	Qualification for the Cup Winners' Cup first round (Note: Liverpool qualified for the Cup Winners' Cup as FA Cup runners-up, as winners Manchester United already qualified for the Champions League. They defaulted their UEFA Cup spot from league position to Arsenal.)
4	Aston Villa	38	18	9	11	52	35	+17	63	Qualification for the UEFA Cup first round
5	Arsenal	38	17	12	9	49	32	+17	63	Qualification for the UEFA Cup first round
6	Everton	38	17	10	11	64	44	+20	61	Excluded from the UEFA Cup (Note: The Football Association was initially awarded a UEFA Fair Play berth to the Premier League's highest-placed team not qualified for Europe, but was revoked by UEFA for its clubs fielding under-strength sides in the 1995 UEFA Intertoto Cup.)
7	Blackburn Rovers	38	18	7	13	61	47	+14	61	
8	Tottenham Hotspur	38	16	13	9	50	38	+12	61	
9	Nottingham Forest	38	15	13	10	50	54	−4	58	
10	West Ham United	38	14	9	15	43	52	−9	51	
11	Chelsea	38	12	14	12	46	44	+2	50	
12	Middlesbrough	38	11	10	17	35	50	−15	43	
13	Leeds United	38	12	7	19	40	57	−17	43	
14	Wimbledon	38	10	11	17	55	70	−15	41	
15	Sheffield Wednesday	38	10	10	18	48	61	−13	40	
16	Coventry City	38	8	14	16	42	60	−18	38	
17	Southampton	38	9	11	18	34	52	−18	38	
18	Manchester City (R)	38	9	11	18	33	58	−25	38	Relegation to Football League First Division
19	Queens Park Rangers (R)	38	9	6	23	38	57	−19	33	Relegation to Football League First Division
20	Bolton Wanderers (R)	38	8	5	25	39	71	−32	29	Relegation to Football League First Division

Source: Premier League
Rules for classification: 1) points; 2) goal difference; 3) number of goals scored.
(C) Champions; (R) Relegated

== Results ==
Home \ Away	ARS	AVL	BLB	BOL	CHE	COV	EVE	LEE	LIV	MCI	MUN	MID	NEW	NFO	QPR	SHW	SOU	TOT	WHU	WIM
Arsenal	—	2–0	0–0	2–1	1–1	1–1	1–2	2–1	0–0	3–1	1–0	1–1	2–0	1–1	3–0	4–2	4–2	0–0	1–0	1–3
Aston Villa	1–1	—	2–0	1–0	0–1	4–1	1–0	3–0	0–2	0–1	3–1	0–0	1–1	1–1	4–2	3–2	3–0	2–1	1–1	2–0
Blackburn Rovers	1–1	1–1	—	3–1	3–0	5–1	0–3	1–0	2–3	2–0	1–2	1–0	2–1	7–0	1–0	3–0	2–1	2–1	4–2	3–2
Bolton Wanderers	1–0	0–2	2–1	—	2–1	1–2	1–1	0–2	0–1	1–1	0–6	1–1	1–3	1–1	0–1	2–1	0–1	2–3	0–3	1–0
Chelsea	1–0	1–2	2–3	3–2	—	2–2	0–0	4–1	2–2	1–1	1–4	5–0	1–0	1–0	1–1	0–0	3–0	0–0	1–2	1–2
Coventry City	0–0	0–3	5–0	0–2	1–0	—	2–1	0–0	1–0	2–1	0–4	0–0	0–1	1–1	1–0	0–1	1–1	2–3	2–2	3–3
Everton	0–2	1–0	1–0	3–0	1–1	2–2	—	2–0	1–1	2–0	2–3	4–0	1–3	3–0	2–0	2–2	2–0	1–1	3–0	2–4
Leeds United	0–3	2–0	0–0	0–1	1–0	3–1	2–2	—	1–0	0–1	3–1	0–1	0–1	1–3	1–3	2–0	1–0	1–3	2–0	1–1
Liverpool	3–1	3–0	3–0	5–2	2–0	0–0	1–2	5–0	—	6–0	2–0	1–0	4–3	4–2	1–0	1–0	1–1	0–0	2–0	2–2
Manchester City	0–1	1–0	1–1	1–0	0–1	1–1	0–2	0–0	2–2	—	2–3	0–1	3–3	1–1	2–0	1–0	2–1	1–1	2–1	1–0
Manchester United	1–0	0–0	1–0	3–0	1–1	1–0	2–0	1–0	2–2	1–0	—	2–0	2–0	5–0	2–1	2–2	4–1	1–0	2–1	3–1
Middlesbrough	2–3	0–2	2–0	1–4	2–0	2–1	0–2	1–1	2–1	4–1	0–3	—	1–2	1–1	1–0	3–1	0–0	0–1	4–2	1–2
Newcastle United	2–0	1–0	1–0	2–1	2–0	3–0	1–0	2–1	2–1	3–1	0–1	1–0	—	3–1	2–1	2–0	1–0	1–1	3–0	6–1
Nottingham Forest	0–1	1–1	1–5	3–2	0–0	0–0	3–2	2–1	1–0	3–0	1–1	1–0	1–1	—	3–0	1–0	1–0	2–1	1–1	4–1
Queens Park Rangers	1–1	1–0	0–1	2–1	1–2	1–1	3–1	1–2	1–2	1–0	1–1	1–1	2–3	1–1	—	0–3	3–0	2–3	3–0	0–3
Sheffield Wednesday	1–0	2–0	2–1	4–2	0–0	4–3	2–5	6–2	1–1	1–1	0–0	0–1	0–2	1–3	1–3	—	2–2	1–3	0–1	2–1
Southampton	0–0	0–1	1–0	1–0	2–3	1–0	2–2	1–1	1–3	1–1	3–1	2–1	1–0	3–4	2–0	0–1	—	0–0	0–0	0–0
Tottenham Hotspur	2–1	0–1	2–3	2–2	1–1	3–1	0–0	2–1	1–3	1–0	4–1	1–1	1–1	0–1	1–0	1–0	1–0	—	0–1	3–1
West Ham United	0–1	1–4	1–1	1–0	1–3	3–2	2–1	1–2	0–0	4–2	0–1	2–0	2–0	1–0	1–0	1–1	2–1	1–1	—	1–1
Wimbledon	0–3	3–3	1–1	3–2	1–1	0–2	2–3	2–4	1–0	3–0	2–4	0–0	3–3	1–0	2–1	2–2	1–2	0–1	0–1	—

Source: Premier League
Legend: Blue = home team win; Yellow = draw; Red = away team win.
For upcoming matches, an "a" indicates there is an article about the rivalry between the two participants.

== Season statistics ==
=== Scoring ===
==== Top scorers ====
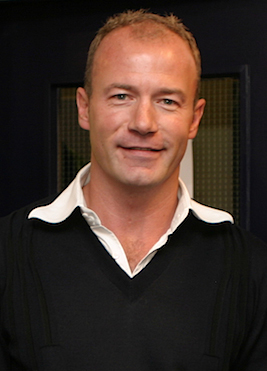
Blackburn's Alan Shearer was the top scorer for the second time, with 31 goals.

Rank	Player	Club	Goals
1	(England) Alan Shearer	Blackburn Rovers	31
2	(England) Robbie Fowler	Liverpool	28
3	(England) Les Ferdinand	Newcastle United	25
4	(Trinidad and Tobago) Dwight Yorke	Aston Villa	17
5	(England) Teddy Sheringham	Tottenham Hotspur	16
6	(England) Chris Armstrong	Tottenham Hotspur	15
6	(Russia) Andrei Kanchelskis	Everton	15
6	(England) Ian Wright	Arsenal	15
9	(France) Eric Cantona	Manchester United	14
9	(England) Stan Collymore	Liverpool	14
9	(England) Dion Dublin	Coventry City	14

==== Hat-tricks ====
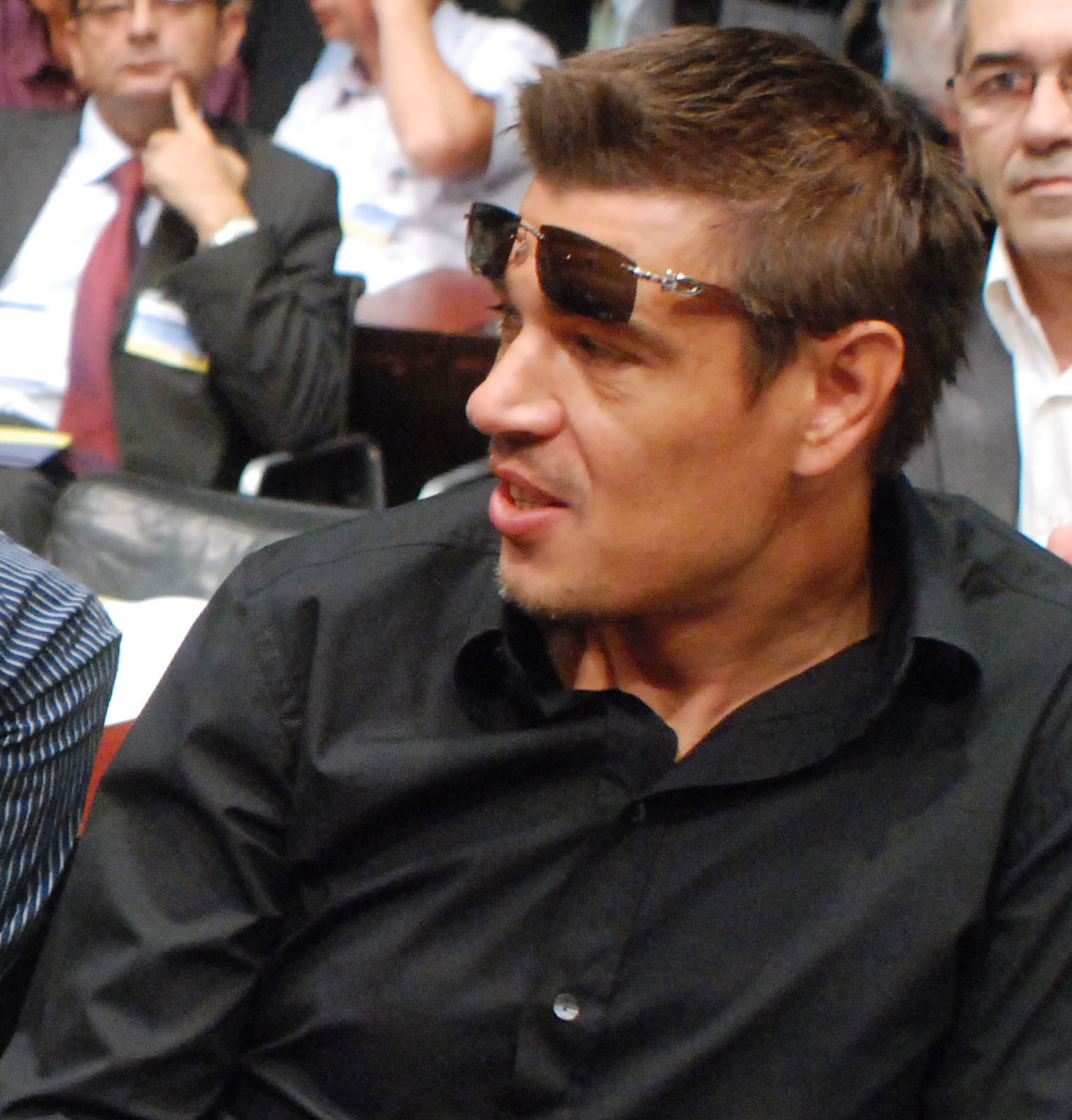
Savo Milošević is the only player to score a hat-trick while representing the Federal Republic of Yugoslavia national football team.

Player	For	Against	Result	Date	Ref
(England) Matt Le Tissier	Southampton	Nottingham Forest	3–4 (A)	15 August 1995	
(England) Robbie Fowler^{4}	Liverpool	Bolton Wanderers	5–2 (H)	23 August 1995	
(England) Alan Shearer	Blackburn Rovers	Coventry City	5–1 (H)	23 August 1995	
(Ghana) Tony Yeboah	Leeds United	Wimbledon	4–2 (H)	23 August 1995	
(England) Les Ferdinand	Newcastle United	Wimbledon	6–1 (H)	21 October 1995	
(Scotland) Gary McAllister	Leeds United	Coventry City	3–1 (H)	28 October 1995	
(England) Alan Shearer	Blackburn Rovers	Nottingham Forest	7–0 (H)	18 November 1995	
(England) Alan Shearer	Blackburn Rovers	West Ham United	4–2 (H)	2 December 1995	
(England) Dion Dublin	Coventry City	Sheffield Wednesday	4–3 (A)	4 December 1995	
(Federal Republic of Yugoslavia) Savo Milošević	Aston Villa	Coventry City	4–1 (H)	16 December 1995	
(England) Robbie Fowler	Liverpool	Arsenal	3–1 (H)	23 December 1995	
(England) Alan Shearer	Blackburn Rovers	Bolton Wanderers	3–1 (H)	3 February 1996	
(England) Gavin Peacock	Chelsea	Middlesbrough	5–0 (H)	4 February 1996	
(England) Alan Shearer	Blackburn Rovers	Tottenham Hotspur	3–2 (A)	16 March 1996	
(Wales) Mark Hughes	Chelsea	Leeds United	4–1 (H)	13 April 1996	
(Russia) Andrei Kanchelskis	Everton	Sheffield Wednesday	5–2 (A)	27 April 1996	

Note: ^{4} Player scored 4 goals; (H) – Home; (A) – Away

== Awards ==
=== Monthly awards ===
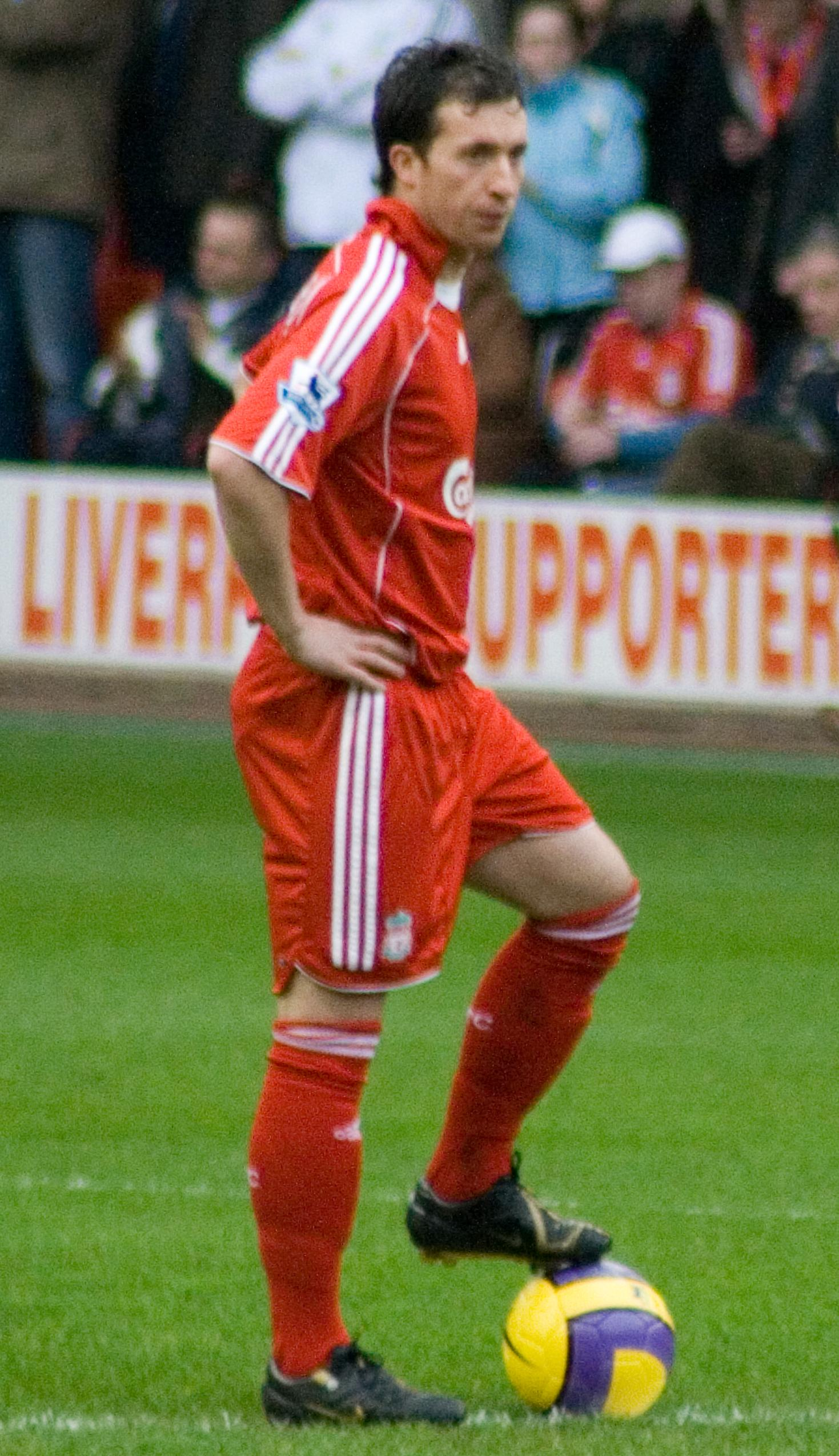
Liverpool's Robbie Fowler became the first player to win the Player of the Month award in consecutive months.

Month	Manager of the Month		Player of the Month	
Month	Manager	Club	Player	Club
August	(England) Kevin Keegan	Newcastle United	(France) David Ginola	Newcastle United
September	(England) Kevin Keegan	Newcastle United	(Ghana) Tony Yeboah	Leeds United
October	(England) Frank Clark	Nottingham Forest	(England) Trevor Sinclair	Queens Park Rangers
November	(England) Alan Ball	Manchester City	(England) Rob Lee	Newcastle United
December	(England) Roy Evans	Liverpool	(England) Robbie Fowler	Liverpool
January	(England) Roy Evans	Liverpool	(England) Stan Collymore	Liverpool
January	(England) Roy Evans	Liverpool	(England) Robbie Fowler	Liverpool
February	(Scotland) Alex Ferguson	Manchester United	(Trinidad and Tobago) Dwight Yorke	Aston Villa
March	(Scotland) Alex Ferguson	Manchester United	(France) Eric Cantona	Manchester United
April	(England) Dave Merrington	Southampton	(Russia) Andrei Kanchelskis	Everton

=== Annual awards ===
Award	Winner	Club
Premier League Manager of the Season	(Scotland) Alex Ferguson	Manchester United
PFA Players' Player of the Year	(England) Les Ferdinand	Newcastle United
PFA Young Player of the Year	(England) Robbie Fowler	Liverpool
FWA Footballer of the Year	(France) Eric Cantona	Manchester United

PFA Team of the Year
Goalkeeper	(England) David James (Liverpool)			
Defence	(England) Gary Neville (Manchester United)	(England) Tony Adams (Arsenal)	(England) Ugo Ehiogu (Aston Villa)	(England) Alan Wright (Aston Villa)
Midfield	(England) Steve Stone (Nottingham Forest)	(England) Rob Lee (Newcastle United)	(Netherlands) Ruud Gullit (Chelsea)	(France) David Ginola (Newcastle United)
Attack	(England) Les Ferdinand (Newcastle United)		(England) Alan Shearer (Blackburn Rovers)	

== Attendances ==
#	Football club	Home games	Average attendance
1	Manchester United	19	41,681
2	Liverpool FC	19	39,553
3	Arsenal FC	19	37,568
4	Newcastle United	19	36,505
5	Everton FC	19	35,424
6	Aston Villa	19	32,772
7	Leeds United	19	32,629
8	Tottenham Hotspur	19	30,548
9	Middlesbrough FC	19	29,252
10	Manchester City	19	27,941
11	Blackburn Rovers	19	27,552
12	Nottingham Forest	19	25,916
13	Chelsea FC	19	25,598
14	Sheffield Wednesday	19	24,874
15	West Ham United	19	22,317
16	Bolton Wanderers	19	18,823
17	Coventry City	19	18,528
18	Queens Park Rangers	19	15,672
19	Southampton FC	19	14,822
20	Wimbledon FC	19	13,230

== See also ==
- 1995–96 in English football
