= Premier League Manager of the Month =

Football association award

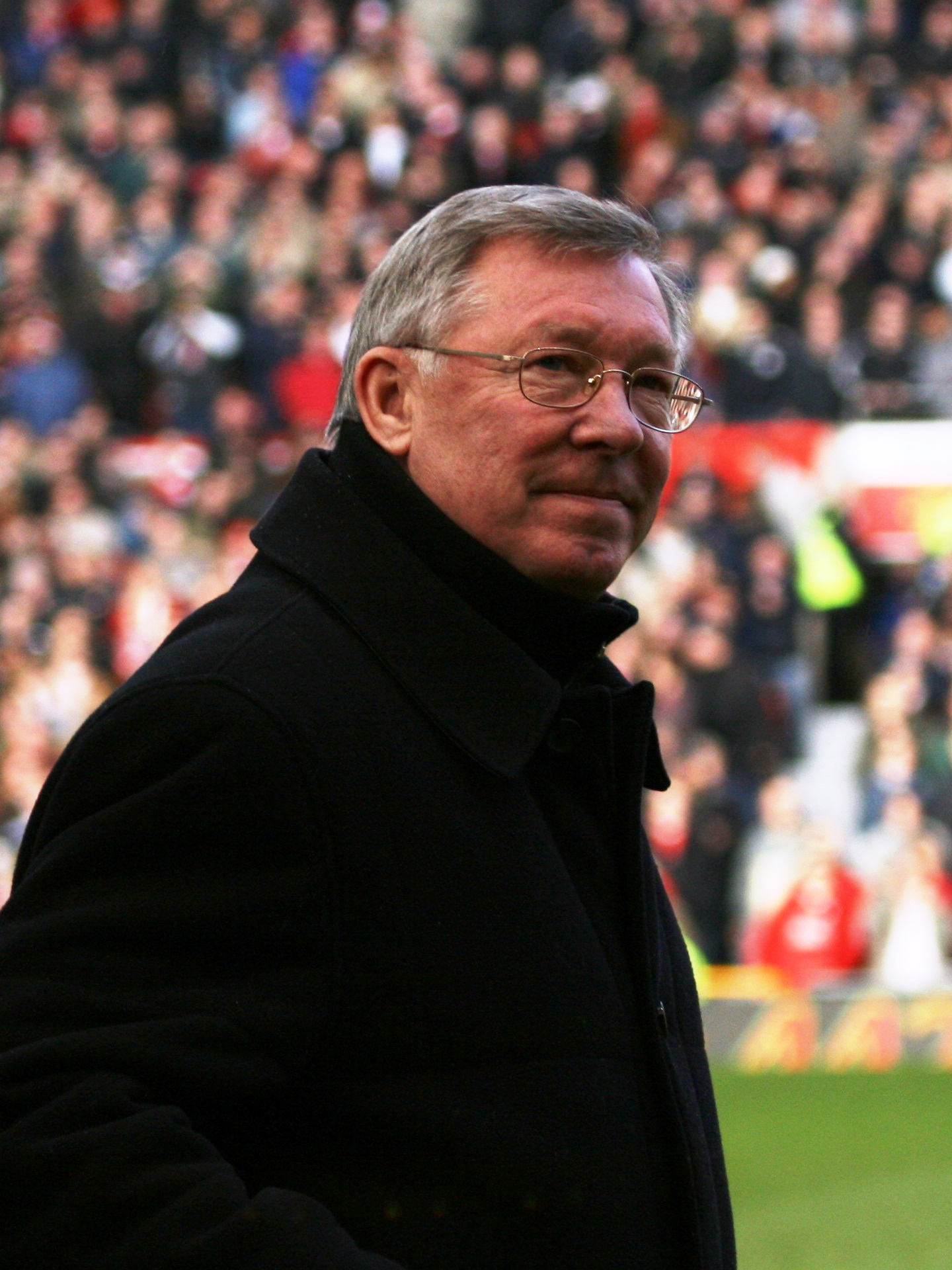
Alex Ferguson has 28 Manager of the Month awards and was the inaugural recipient.

The April 1999 award given to Alex Ferguson.

The Premier League Manager of the Month is an association football award that recognises the best adjudged Premier League manager each month of the season. The winner is chosen by a combination of an online public vote, which contributes to 10% of the final tally, and a panel of experts. It has been called the Carling Premiership Manager of the Month (1993–2001) and the Barclaycard Premiership Manager of the Month (2001–2004); it is currently known as the Barclays Manager of the Month.

The Premier League was formed in 1992, when the members of the First Division resigned from the Football League. These clubs set up a new commercially independent league that negotiated its own broadcast and sponsorship agreements. The Premier League introduced new Manager of the Month and Manager of the Season awards for the 1993–94 season, supplementing the existing Football Writers' Association and Professional Footballers' Association Player of the Year awards. The first Manager of the Month was awarded to Manchester United manager Alex Ferguson for his achievements in August 1993. For the 1994–95 season, the Premier League introduced the Player of the Month award, which is presented alongside the Manager of the Month award.

Ferguson has been Manager of the Month the most times with a record 27 awards. Harry Redknapp has had six spells managing Premier League clubs (West Ham United, Portsmouth, Southampton, Portsmouth again, Tottenham Hotspur, and Queens Park Rangers), winning a Manager of the Month award in five of those spells. Sixteen other managers have won an award with two or more clubs: Gordon Strachan with Coventry City and Southampton, Stuart Pearce with Nottingham Forest and Manchester City, Martin O'Neill with Leicester City, Aston Villa, and Sunderland, Roy Hodgson with Blackburn Rovers and Fulham, Rafael Benítez with Liverpool, Chelsea, and Newcastle United, Brendan Rodgers with Swansea City and Liverpool, Alan Pardew with West Ham United and Newcastle United, Sam Allardyce with Bolton Wanderers and West Ham United, Tony Pulis with Crystal Palace and West Bromwich Albion, Mauricio Pochettino with Southampton and Tottenham Hotspur, Claudio Ranieri with Chelsea and Leicester City, Carlo Ancelotti with Chelsea and Everton, José Mourinho with Chelsea and Tottenham Hotspur, Nuno Espírito Santo with Wolverhampton Wanderers, Tottenham Hotspur, and Nottingham Forest, Eddie Howe with Bournemouth and Newcastle United, and Sean Dyche with Burnley and Everton.

The award has been won in consecutive months by 17 managers: Joe Kinnear, Kevin Keegan, Roy Evans, Alex Ferguson, Arsène Wenger, David O'Leary, Stuart Pearce, Paul Jewell, Rafael Benítez, Carlo Ancelotti, Manuel Pellegrini, Claudio Ranieri, Antonio Conte, Pep Guardiola, Jürgen Klopp, Mikel Arteta, and Ange Postecoglou. Guardiola is the only manager in Premier League history to have won the award in four successive months. Klopp is the first manager to win the award five times in a season. Postecoglou is the only manager to win the award in each of his first three months in the competition. The award has been shared on one occasion, in March 2002, when Liverpool manager Gérard Houllier was jointly awarded Manager of the Month with caretaker manager Phil Thompson, who had deputised while Houllier was absent for medical reasons.

As of October 2026, the latest recipient of the award is Tottenham Hotspur head coach Roberto De Zerbi.

== Key ==
- Managers marked † shared the award with another manager.

== List of winners ==
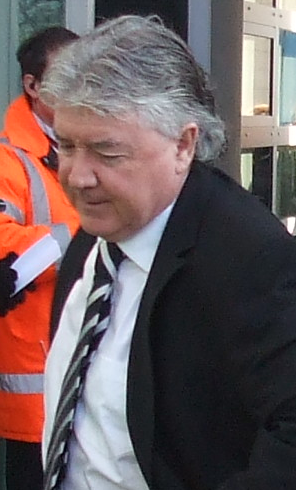
Joe Kinnear, the first manager to win the awards consecutively, and the first to win three awards in a season.

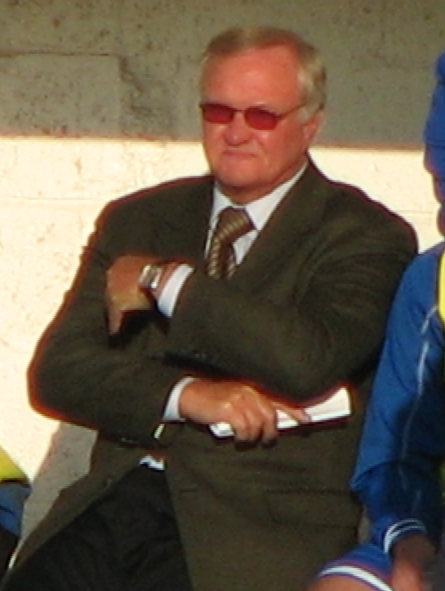
Ron Atkinson, winner in March 1995

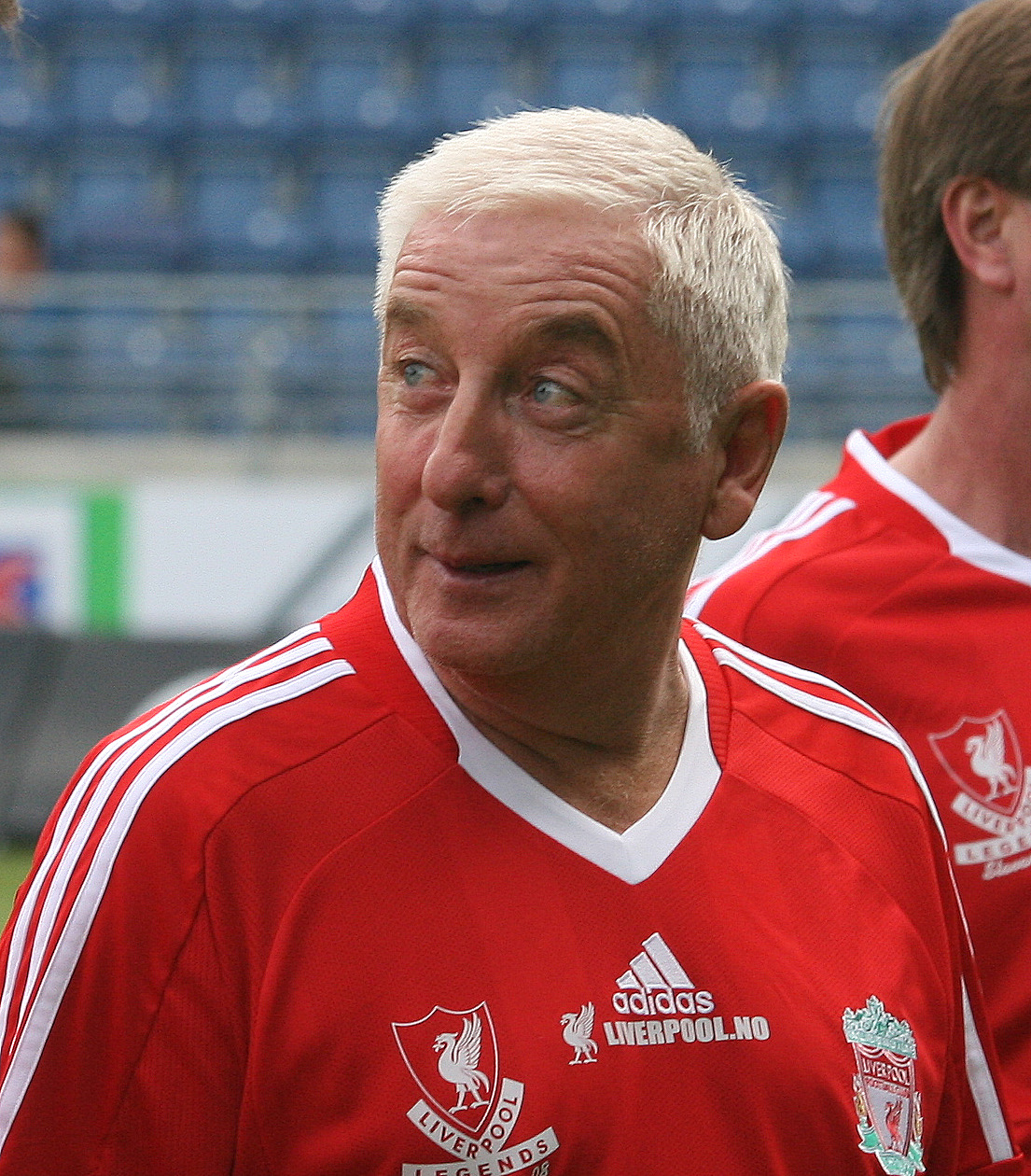
Roy Evans was the first Liverpool manager to become Manager of the Month, winning two consecutive awards in December 1995 and January 1996.

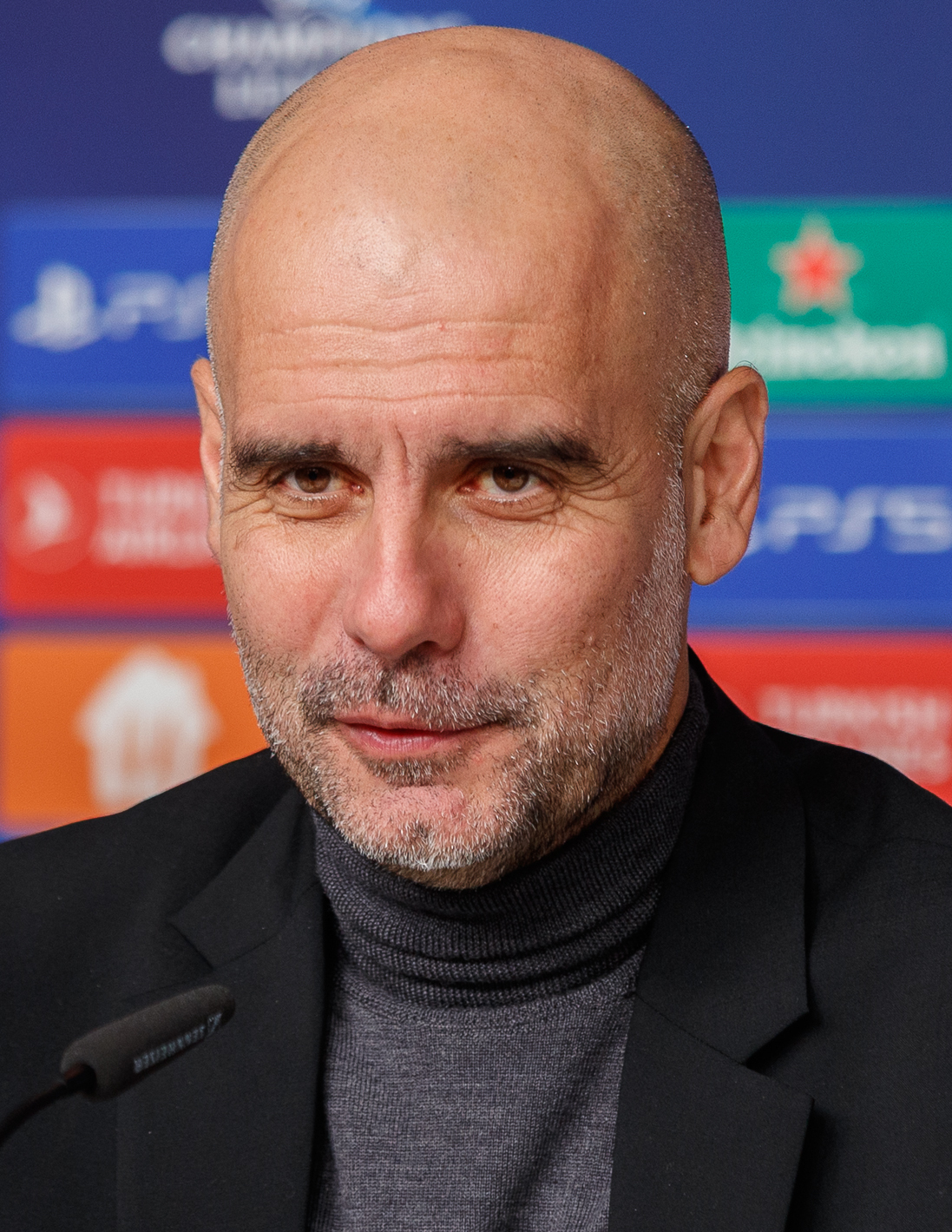
Pep Guardiola holds the record for the most consecutive awards – four, from September to December 2017.

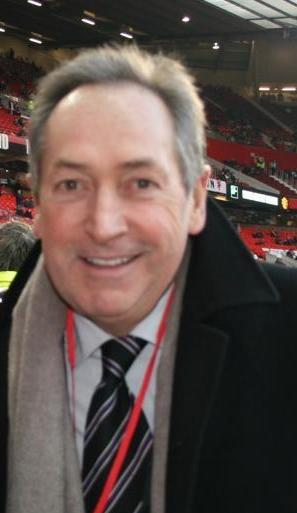
Gérard Houllier won three awards, of which one was shared with Phil Thompson.

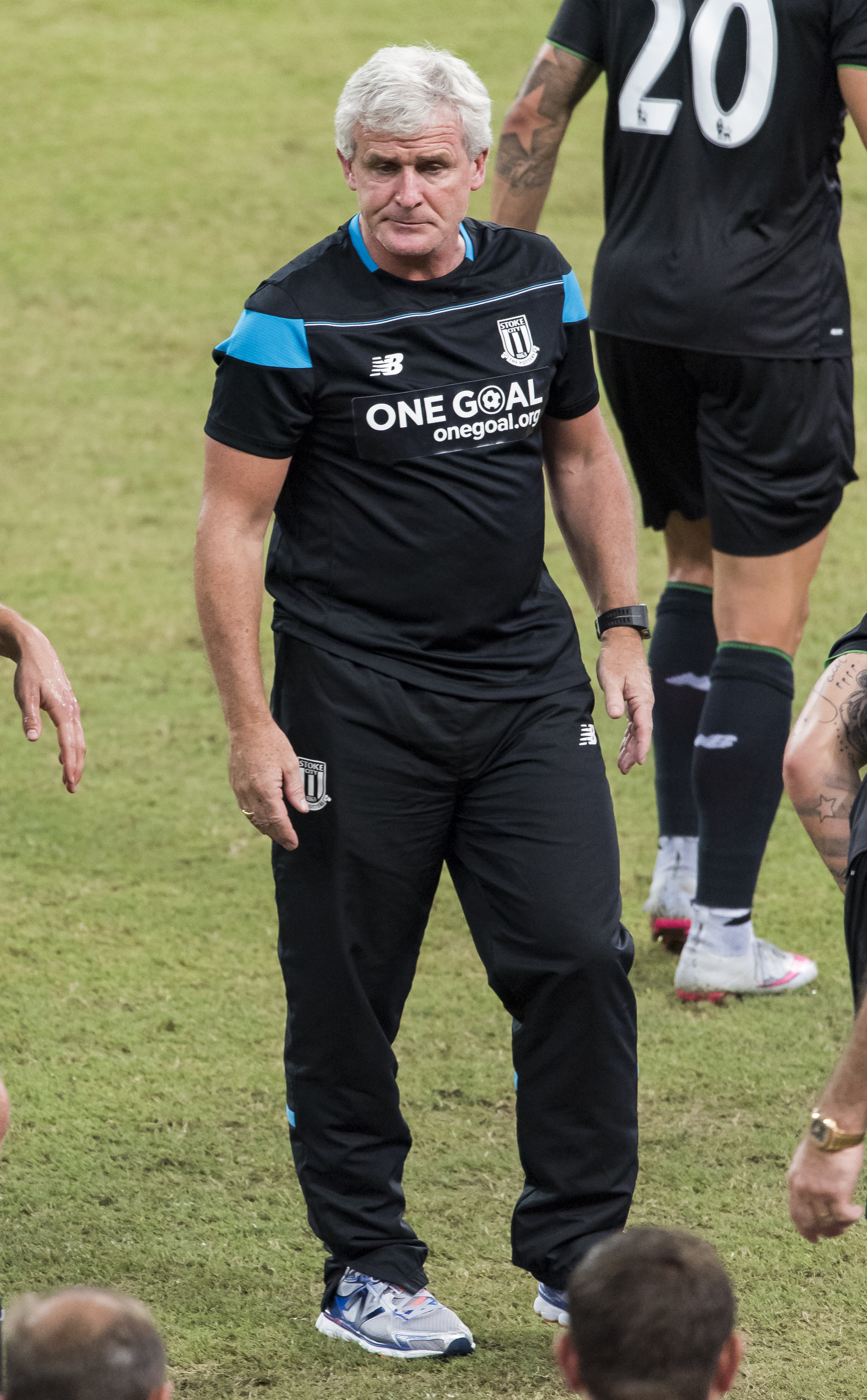
In October 2007, Mark Hughes became the fourth Blackburn Rovers manager to win Manager of Month.

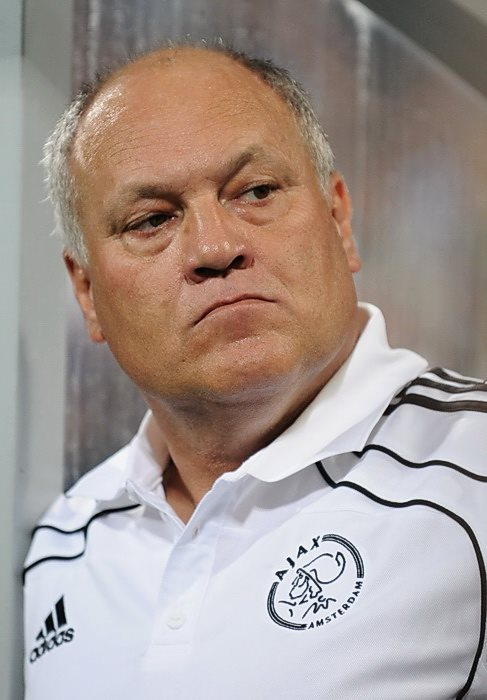
Martin Jol, winner in December 2004

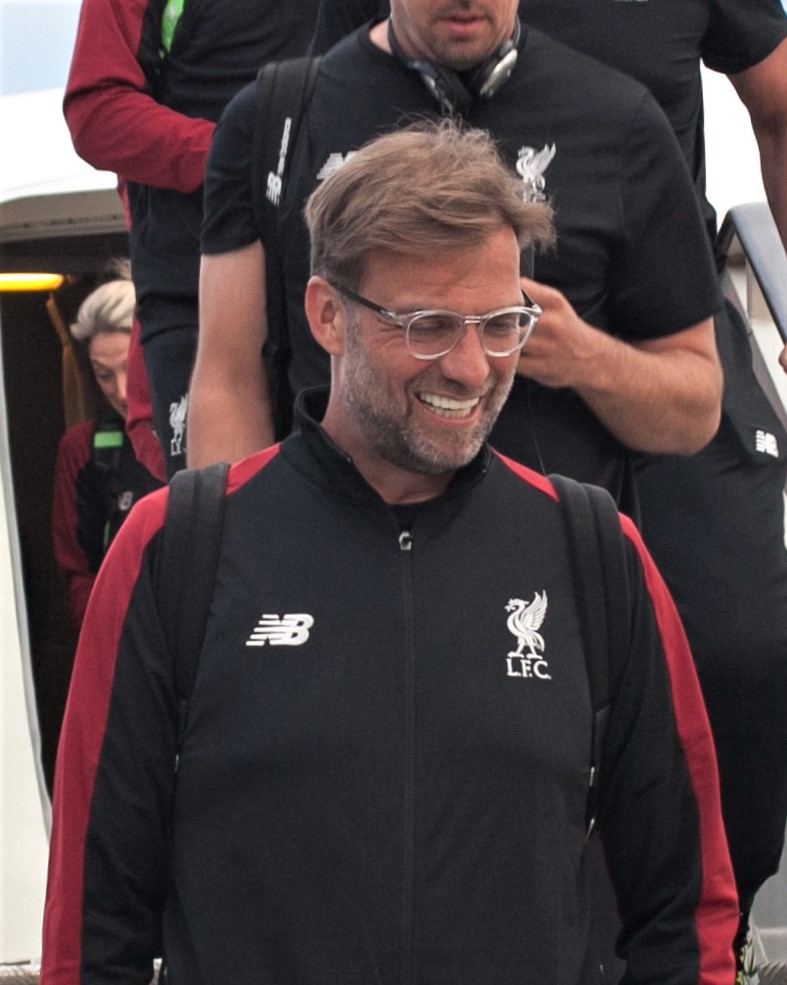
Jürgen Klopp won a record five awards in a single season.

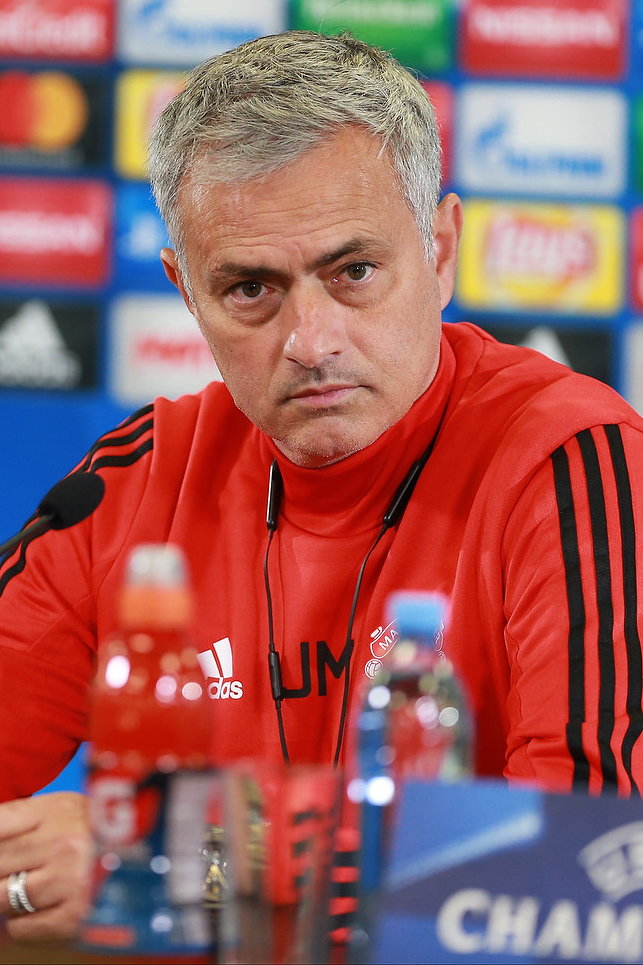
José Mourinho has won the award four times.

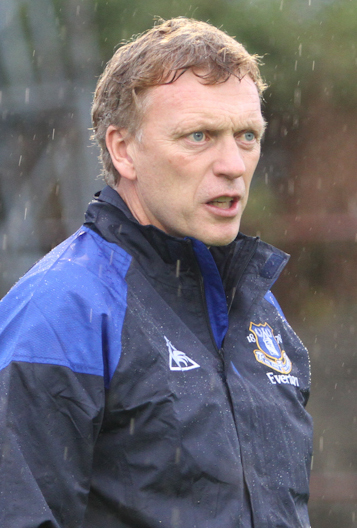
David Moyes has 11 Manager of the Month awards, the joint-third most.

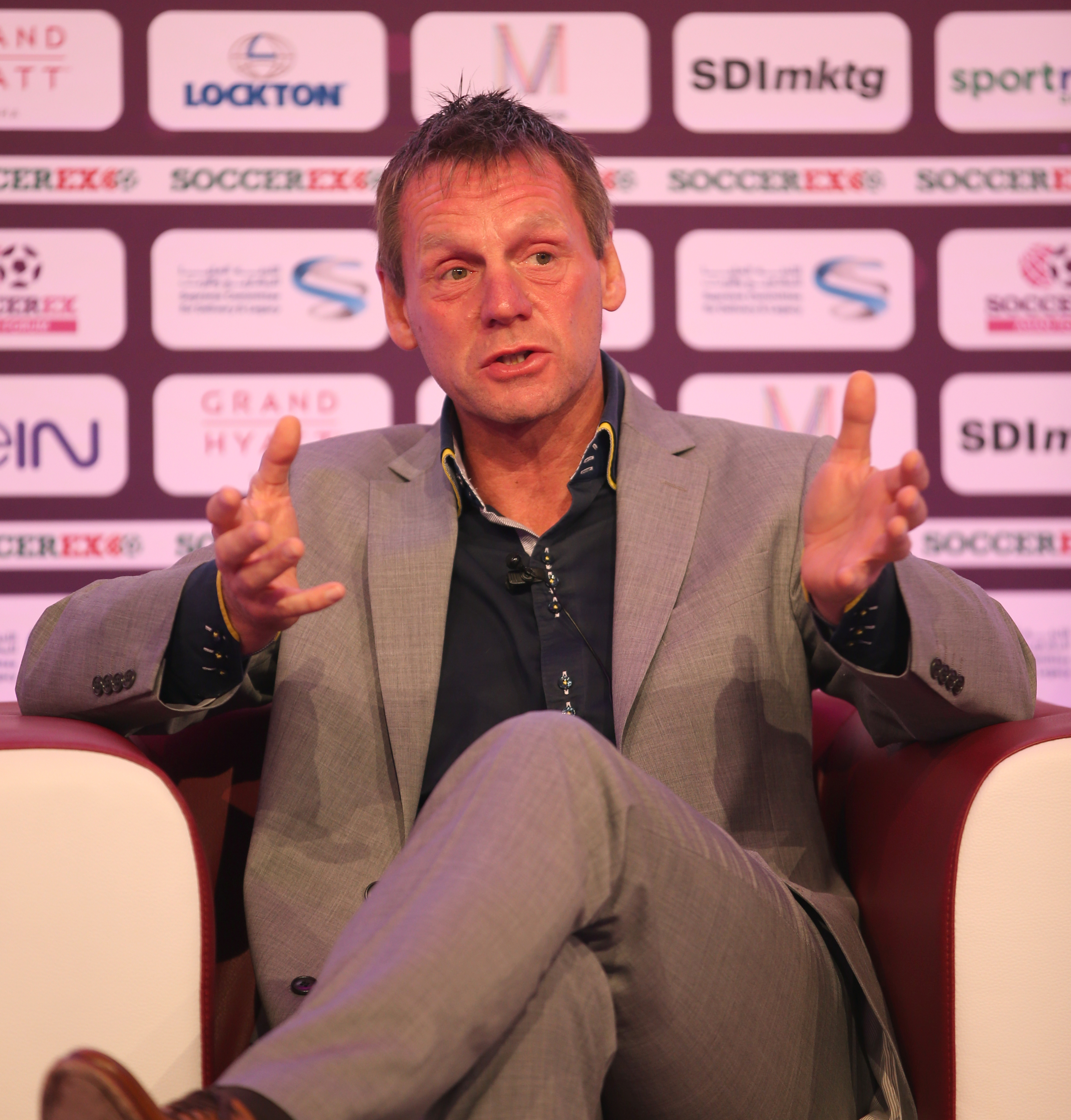
Stuart Pearce is a three-time Manager of the Month and a former Player of the Month.

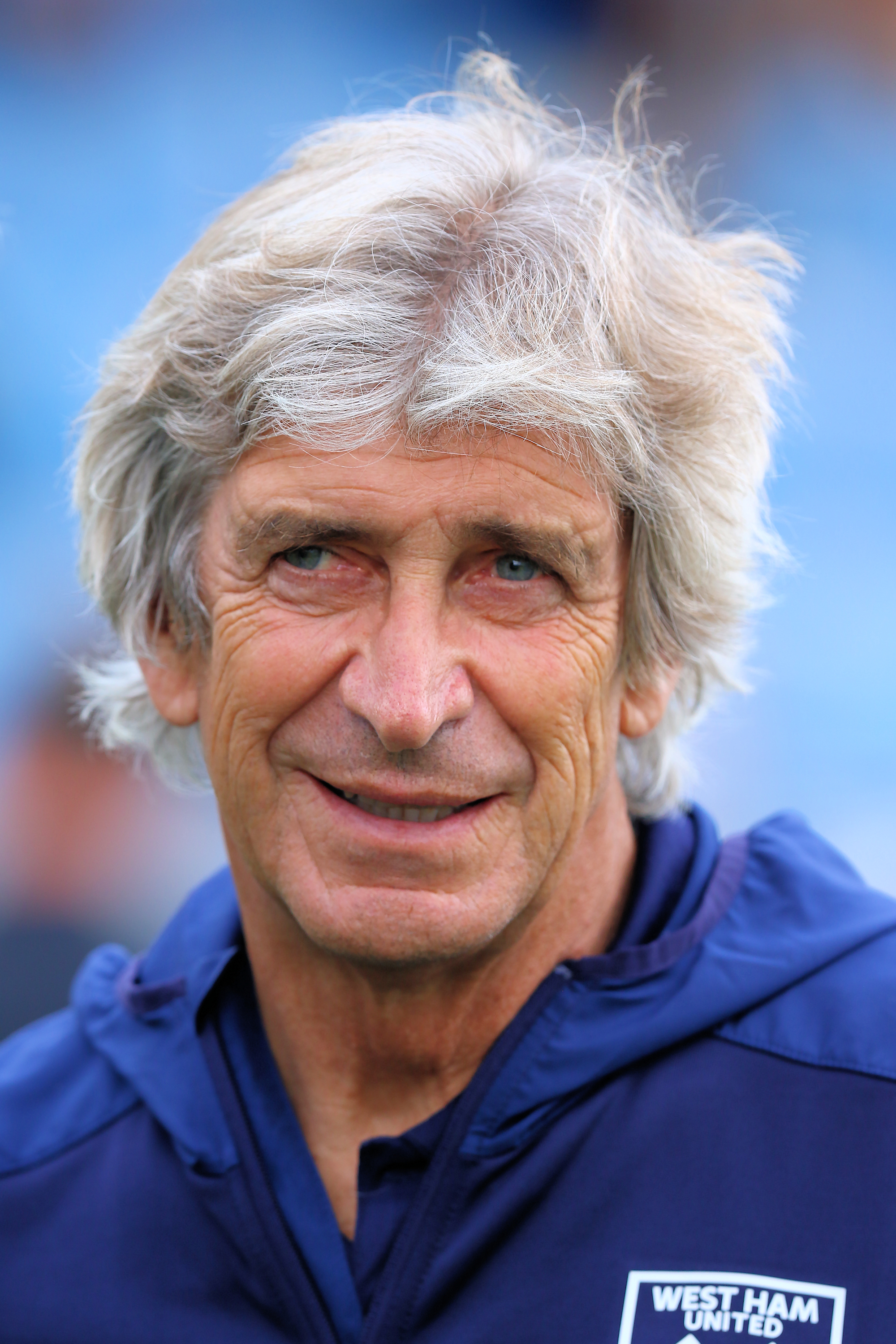
Manuel Pellegrini is the first Manchester City manager to win four Manager of the Month awards.

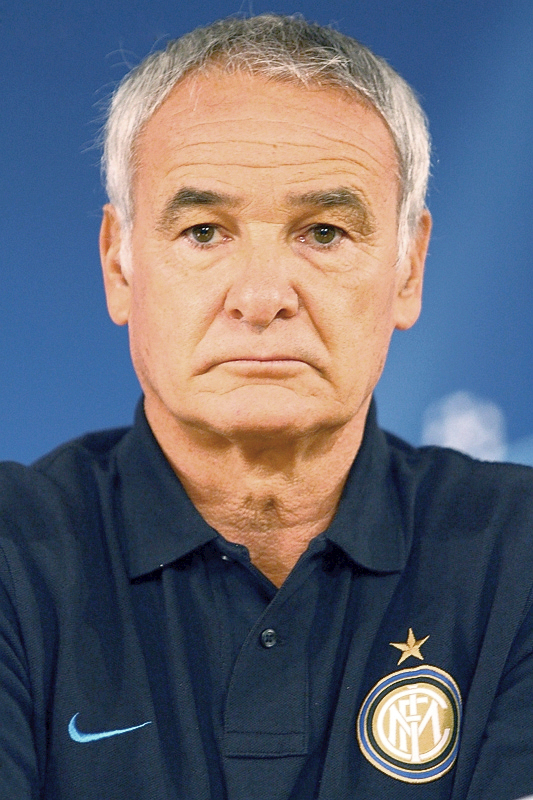
Claudio Ranieri has won five awards.

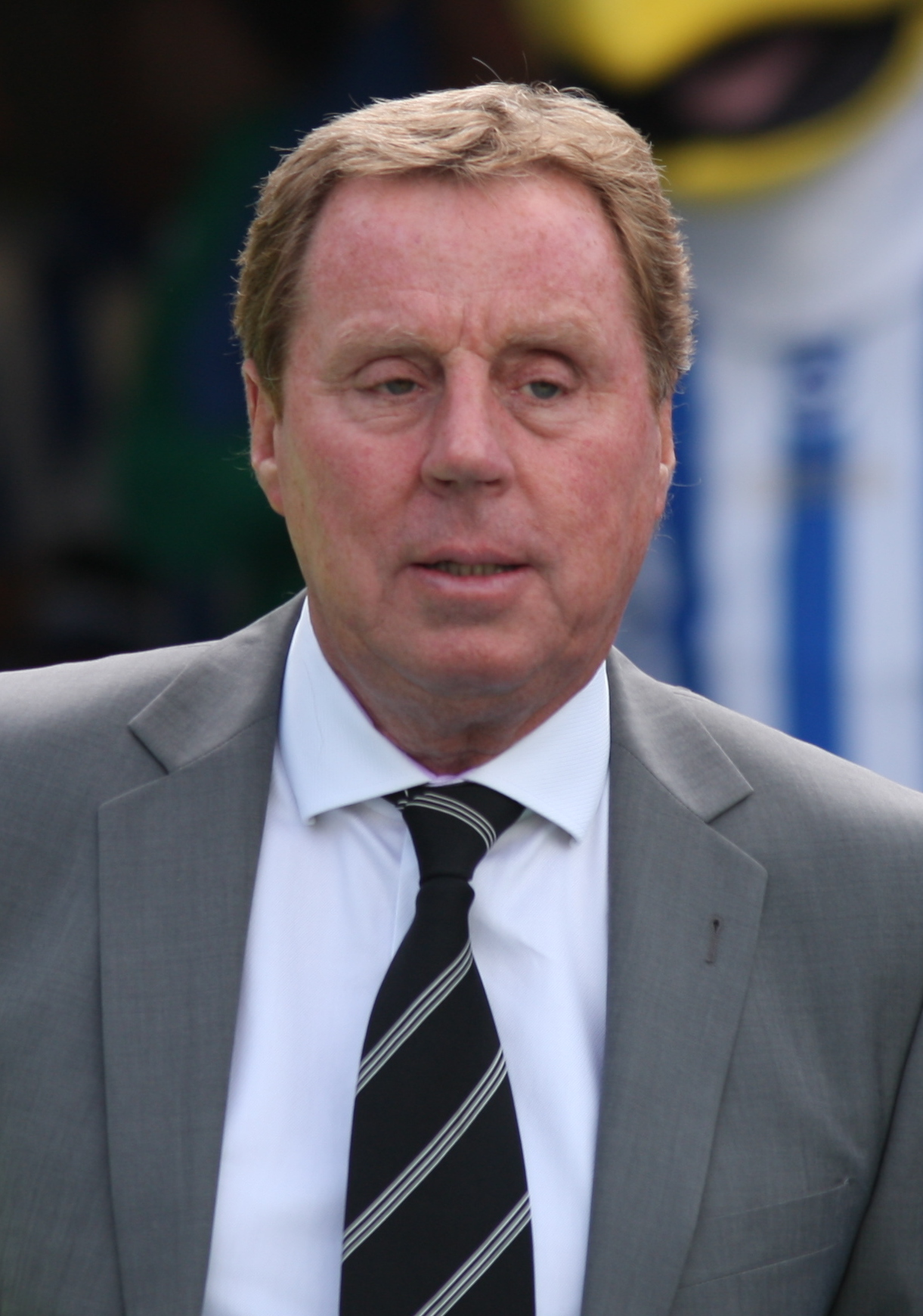
Harry Redknapp, Manager of the Month with four different clubs

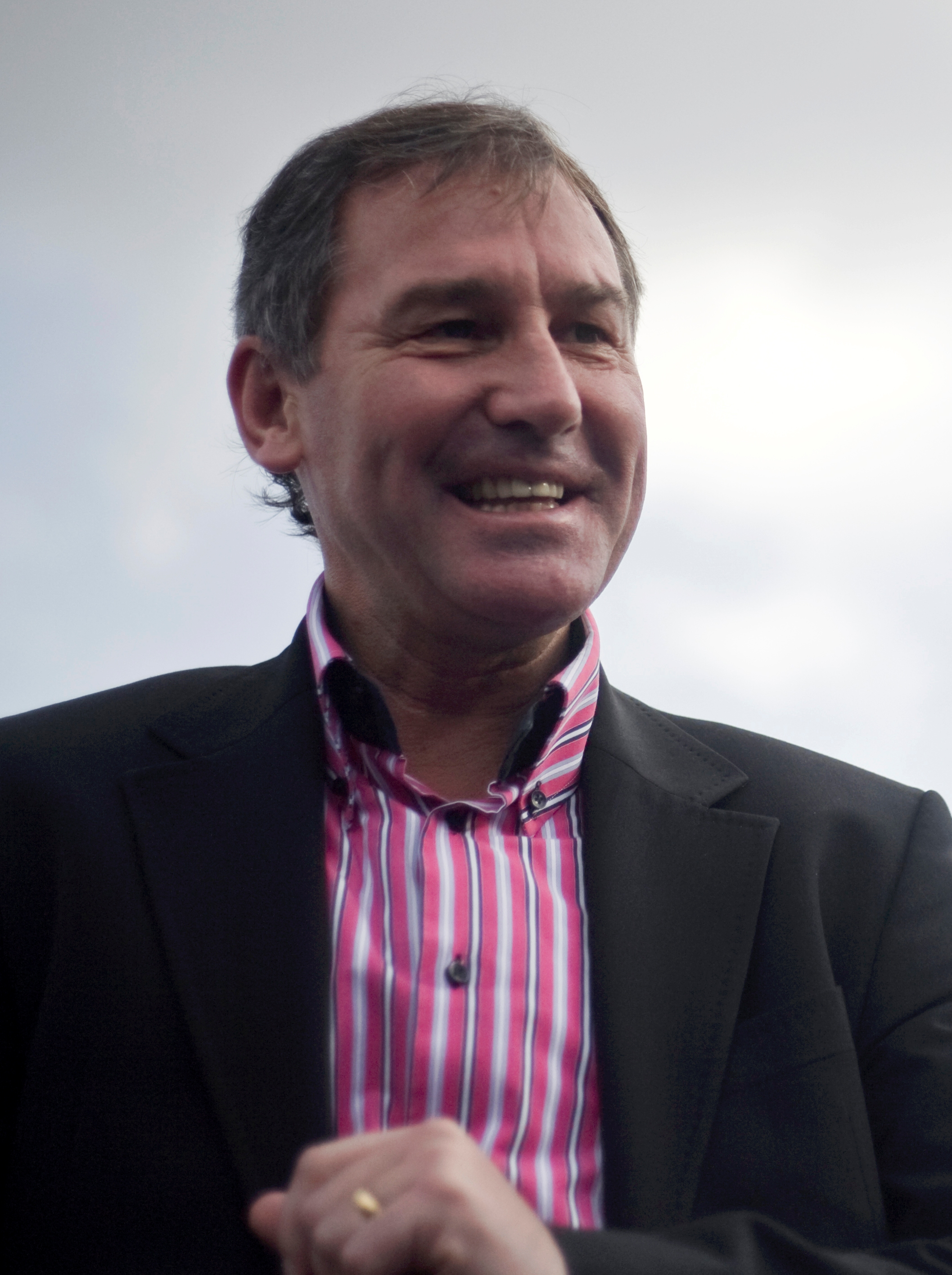
Bryan Robson was Manager of the Month in March 1997.

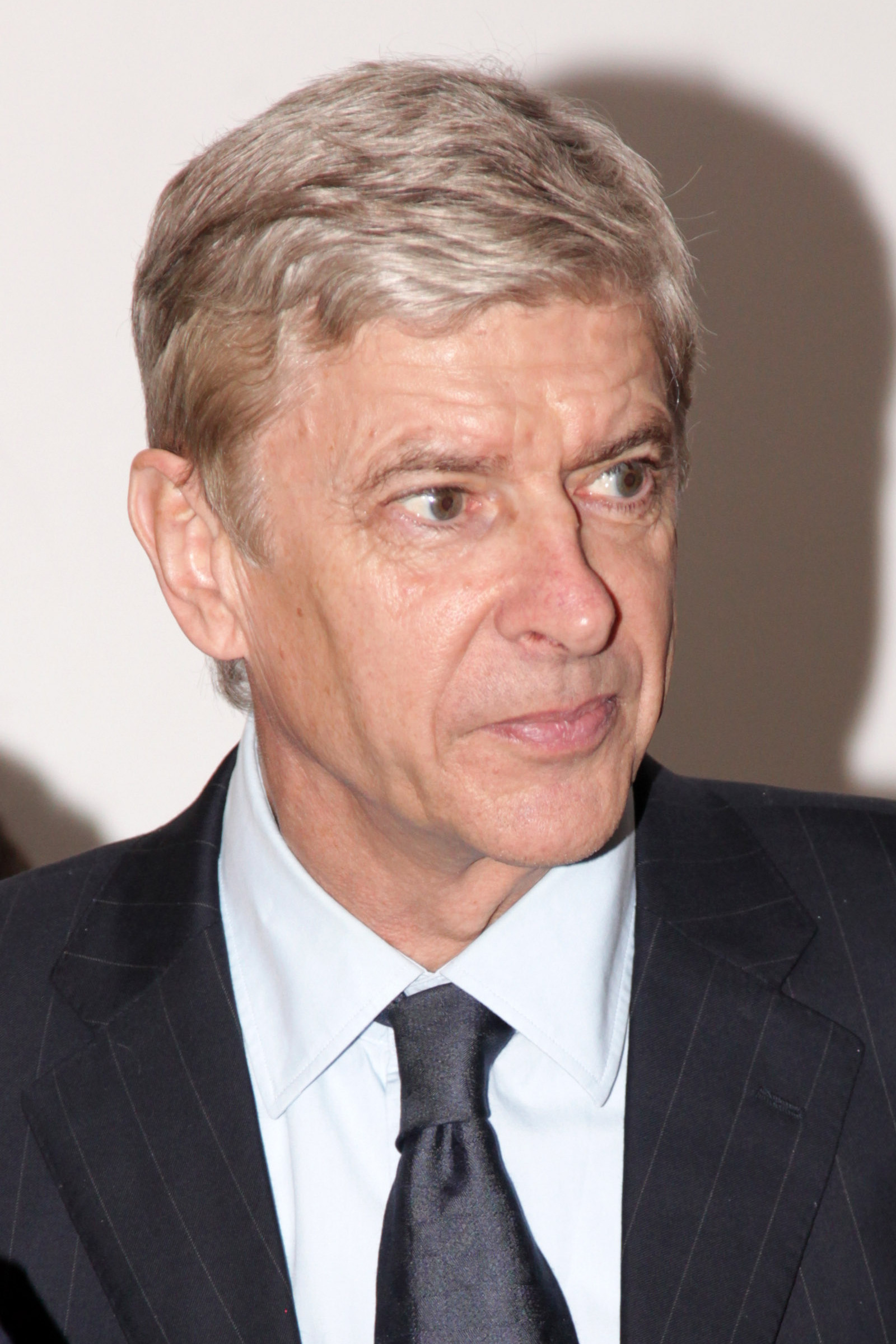
Arsène Wenger has won fifteen Manager of the Month awards, second only to Alex Ferguson.

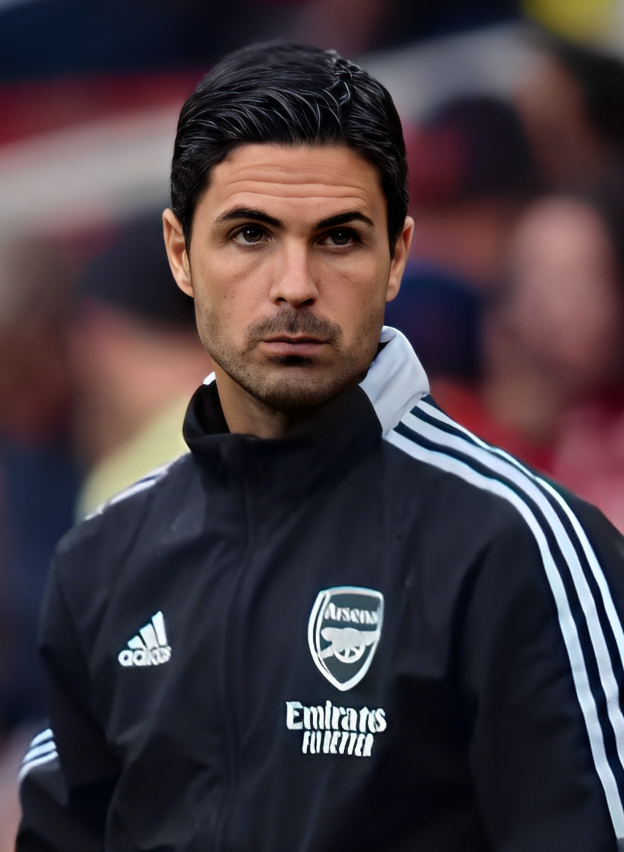
Mikel Arteta has won eight Manager of the Month awards.

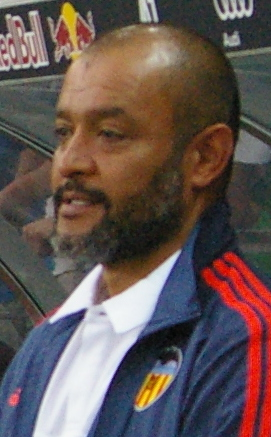
Nuno Espírito Santo has won seven Manager of the Month awards.

Month	Year (Note: Each year in the table is linked to the article about the corresponding football season.)	Manager	Nationality	Club	Ref.
August	1993	Alex Ferguson	Scotland	Manchester United	
September	1993	Joe Kinnear	Ireland	Wimbledon	
October	1993	Mike Walker	Wales	Norwich City	
November	1993	Kevin Keegan	England	Newcastle United	
December	1993	Trevor Francis	England	Sheffield Wednesday	
January	1994	Kenny Dalglish	Scotland	Blackburn Rovers	
February	1994	Joe Royle	England	Oldham Athletic	
March	1994	Joe Kinnear	Ireland	Wimbledon	
April	1994	Joe Kinnear	Ireland	Wimbledon	
August	1994	Kevin Keegan	England	Newcastle United	
September	1994	Frank Clark	England	Nottingham Forest	
October	1994	Alex Ferguson	Scotland	Manchester United	
November	1994	Kenny Dalglish	Scotland	Blackburn Rovers	
December	1994	Gerry Francis	England	Queens Park Rangers	
January	1995	Brian Little	England	Aston Villa	
February	1995	Kevin Keegan	England	Newcastle United	
March	1995	Ron Atkinson	England	Coventry City	
April	1995	Howard Wilkinson	England	Leeds United	
August	1995	Kevin Keegan	England	Newcastle United	
September	1995	Kevin Keegan	England	Newcastle United	
October	1995	Frank Clark	England	Nottingham Forest	
November	1995	Alan Ball	England	Manchester City	
December	1995	Roy Evans	England	Liverpool	
January	1996	Roy Evans	England	Liverpool	
February	1996	Alex Ferguson	Scotland	Manchester United	
March	1996	Alex Ferguson	Scotland	Manchester United	
April	1996	Dave Merrington	England	Southampton	
August	1996	David Pleat	England	Sheffield Wednesday	
September	1996	Joe Kinnear	Ireland	Wimbledon	
October	1996	Graeme Souness	Scotland	Southampton	
November	1996	Jim Smith	England	Derby County	
December	1996	Gordon Strachan	Scotland	Coventry City	
January	1997	Stuart Pearce	England	Nottingham Forest	
February	1997	Alex Ferguson	Scotland	Manchester United	
March	1997	Bryan Robson	England	Middlesbrough	
April	1997	Graeme Souness	Scotland	Southampton	
August	1997	Roy Hodgson	England	Blackburn Rovers	
September	1997	Martin O'Neill	Northern Ireland	Leicester City	
October	1997	Alex Ferguson	Scotland	Manchester United	
November	1997	George Graham	Scotland	Leeds United	
December	1997	Roy Hodgson	England	Blackburn Rovers	
January	1998	Howard Kendall	England	Everton	
February	1998	Gordon Strachan	Scotland	Coventry City	
March	1998	Arsène Wenger	France	Arsenal	
April	1998	Arsène Wenger	France	Arsenal	
August	1998	Alan Curbishley	England	Charlton Athletic	
September	1998	John Gregory	England	Aston Villa	
October	1998	Martin O'Neill	Northern Ireland	Leicester City	
November	1998	Harry Redknapp	England	West Ham United	
December	1998	Brian Kidd	England	Blackburn Rovers	
January	1999	Alex Ferguson	Scotland	Manchester United	
February	1999	Alan Curbishley	England	Charlton Athletic	
March	1999	David O'Leary	Ireland	Leeds United	
April	1999	Alex Ferguson	Scotland	Manchester United	
August	1999	Alex Ferguson	Scotland	Manchester United	
September	1999	Walter Smith	Scotland	Everton	
October	1999	Peter Reid	England	Sunderland	
November	1999	Martin O'Neill	Northern Ireland	Leicester City	
December	1999	Gérard Houllier	France	Liverpool	
January	2000	Danny Wilson	Northern Ireland	Sheffield Wednesday	
February	2000	Bobby Robson	England	Newcastle United	
March	2000	Alex Ferguson	Scotland	Manchester United	
April	2000	Alex Ferguson	Scotland	Manchester United	
August	2000	Bobby Robson	England	Newcastle United	
September	2000	Peter Taylor	England	Leicester City	
October	2000	Arsène Wenger	France	Arsenal	
November	2000	George Burley	Scotland	Ipswich Town	
December	2000	Peter Reid	England	Sunderland	
January	2001	Terry Venables	England	Middlesbrough	
February	2001	Alex Ferguson	Scotland	Manchester United	
March	2001	David O'Leary	Ireland	Leeds United	
April	2001	David O'Leary	Ireland	Leeds United	
August	2001	Sam Allardyce	England	Bolton Wanderers	
September	2001	John Gregory	England	Aston Villa	
October	2001	Glenn Hoddle	England	Tottenham Hotspur	
November	2001	Phil Thompson	England	Liverpool	
December	2001	Bobby Robson	England	Newcastle United	
January	2002	Gordon Strachan	Scotland	Southampton	
February	2002	Bobby Robson	England	Newcastle United	
March (Note: Liverpool manager Gérard Houllier became ill during the 2001–02 season, and Phil Thompson became caretaker manager. Houllier returned to his management job in March and he was jointly award Manager of the Month with Thompson. In the tables they are counted as two separate recipients, except for club totals as they were representing the same club in the same month.)	2002	Gérard Houllier †	France	Liverpool	
March	2002	Phil Thompson †	England	Liverpool	
April	2002	Arsène Wenger	France	Arsenal	
August	2002	Glenn Hoddle	England	Tottenham Hotspur	
September	2002	Arsène Wenger	France	Arsenal	
October	2002	Gérard Houllier	France	Liverpool	
November	2002	David Moyes	Scotland	Everton	
December	2002	Gordon Strachan	Scotland	Southampton	
January	2003	Bobby Robson	England	Newcastle United	
February	2003	Alan Curbishley	England	Charlton Athletic	
March	2003	Glenn Roeder	England	West Ham United	
April	2003	Alex Ferguson	Scotland	Manchester United	
August	2003	Arsène Wenger	France	Arsenal	
September	2003	Claudio Ranieri	Italy	Chelsea	
October	2003	Bobby Robson	England	Newcastle United	
November	2003	Sam Allardyce	England	Bolton Wanderers	
December	2003	Alex Ferguson	Scotland	Manchester United	
January	2004	Sam Allardyce	England	Bolton Wanderers	
February	2004	Arsène Wenger	France	Arsenal	
March	2004	Claudio Ranieri	Italy	Chelsea	
April	2004	Harry Redknapp	England	Portsmouth	
August	2004	Arsène Wenger	France	Arsenal	
September	2004	David Moyes	Scotland	Everton	
October	2004	Harry Redknapp	England	Portsmouth	
November	2004	José Mourinho	Portugal	Chelsea	
December	2004	Martin Jol	Netherlands	Tottenham Hotspur	
January	2005	José Mourinho	Portugal	Chelsea	
February	2005	Alex Ferguson	Scotland	Manchester United	
March	2005	Harry Redknapp	England	Southampton	
April	2005	Stuart Pearce	England	Manchester City	
August	2005	Stuart Pearce	England	Manchester City	
September	2005	Paul Jewell	England	Wigan Athletic	
October	2005	Paul Jewell	England	Wigan Athletic	
November	2005	Rafael Benítez	Spain	Liverpool	
December	2005	Rafael Benítez	Spain	Liverpool	
January	2006	David Moyes	Scotland	Everton	
February	2006	Alan Pardew	England	West Ham United	
March	2006	Alex Ferguson	Scotland	Manchester United	
April	2006	Harry Redknapp	England	Portsmouth	
August	2006	Alex Ferguson	Scotland	Manchester United	
September	2006	Steve Coppell	England	Reading	
October	2006	Alex Ferguson	Scotland	Manchester United	
November	2006	Steve Coppell	England	Reading	
December	2006	Sam Allardyce	England	Bolton Wanderers	
January	2007	Rafael Benítez	Spain	Liverpool	
February	2007	Alex Ferguson	Scotland	Manchester United	
March	2007	José Mourinho	Portugal	Chelsea	
April	2007	Martin O'Neill	Northern Ireland	Aston Villa	
August	2007	Sven-Göran Eriksson	Sweden	Manchester City	
September	2007	Arsène Wenger	France	Arsenal	
October	2007	Mark Hughes	Wales	Blackburn Rovers	
November	2007	Martin O'Neill	Northern Ireland	Aston Villa	
December	2007	Arsène Wenger	France	Arsenal	
January	2008	Alex Ferguson	Scotland	Manchester United	
February	2008	David Moyes	Scotland	Everton	
March	2008	Alex Ferguson	Scotland	Manchester United	
April	2008	Avram Grant	Israel	Chelsea	
August	2008	Gareth Southgate	England	Middlesbrough	
September	2008	Phil Brown	England	Hull City	
October	2008	Rafael Benítez	Spain	Liverpool	
November	2008	Gary Megson	England	Bolton Wanderers	
December	2008	Martin O'Neill	Northern Ireland	Aston Villa	
January	2009	Alex Ferguson	Scotland	Manchester United	
February	2009	David Moyes	Scotland	Everton	
March	2009	Rafael Benítez	Spain	Liverpool	
April	2009	Alex Ferguson	Scotland	Manchester United	
August	2009	Harry Redknapp	England	Tottenham Hotspur	
September	2009	Alex Ferguson	Scotland	Manchester United	
October	2009	Roy Hodgson	England	Fulham	
November	2009	Carlo Ancelotti	Italy	Chelsea	
December	2009	Alex McLeish	Scotland	Birmingham City	
January	2010	David Moyes	Scotland	Everton	
February	2010	Roy Hodgson	England	Fulham	
March	2010	David Moyes	Scotland	Everton	
April	2010	Martin O'Neill	Northern Ireland	Aston Villa	
August	2010	Carlo Ancelotti	Italy	Chelsea	
September	2010	Roberto Di Matteo	Italy	West Bromwich Albion	
October	2010	David Moyes	Scotland	Everton	
November	2010	Owen Coyle	Ireland	Bolton Wanderers	
December	2010	Roberto Mancini	Italy	Manchester City	
January	2011	Alex Ferguson	Scotland	Manchester United	
February	2011	Arsène Wenger	France	Arsenal	
March	2011	Carlo Ancelotti	Italy	Chelsea	
April	2011	Carlo Ancelotti	Italy	Chelsea	
August	2011	Alex Ferguson	Scotland	Manchester United	
September	2011	Harry Redknapp	England	Tottenham Hotspur	
October	2011	Roberto Mancini	Italy	Manchester City	
November	2011	Harry Redknapp	England	Tottenham Hotspur	
December	2011	Martin O'Neill	Northern Ireland	Sunderland	
January	2012	Brendan Rodgers	Northern Ireland	Swansea City	
February	2012	Arsène Wenger	France	Arsenal	
March	2012	Owen Coyle	Ireland	Bolton Wanderers	
April	2012	Roberto Martínez	Spain	Wigan Athletic	
September	2012	David Moyes	Scotland	Everton	
October	2012	Alex Ferguson	Scotland	Manchester United	
November	2012	Steve Clarke	Scotland	West Bromwich Albion	
December	2012	André Villas-Boas	Portugal	Tottenham Hotspur	
January	2013	Brian McDermott	England	Reading	
February	2013	André Villas-Boas	Portugal	Tottenham Hotspur	
March	2013	David Moyes	Scotland	Everton	
April	2013	Rafael Benítez	Spain	Chelsea	
August	2013	Brendan Rodgers	Northern Ireland	Liverpool	
September	2013	Arsène Wenger	France	Arsenal	
October	2013	Mauricio Pochettino	Argentina	Southampton	
November	2013	Alan Pardew	England	Newcastle United	
December	2013	Manuel Pellegrini	Chile	Manchester City	
January	2014	Manuel Pellegrini	Chile	Manchester City	
February	2014	Sam Allardyce	England	West Ham United	
March	2014	Brendan Rodgers	Northern Ireland	Liverpool	
April	2014	Tony Pulis	Wales	Crystal Palace	
August	2014	Garry Monk	England	Swansea City	
September	2014	Ronald Koeman	Netherlands	Southampton	
October	2014	Sam Allardyce	England	West Ham United	
November	2014	Alan Pardew	England	Newcastle United	
December	2014	Manuel Pellegrini	Chile	Manchester City	
January	2015	Ronald Koeman	Netherlands	Southampton	
February	2015	Tony Pulis	Wales	West Bromwich Albion	
March	2015	Arsène Wenger	France	Arsenal	
April	2015	Nigel Pearson	England	Leicester City	
August	2015	Manuel Pellegrini	Chile	Manchester City	
September	2015	Mauricio Pochettino	Argentina	Tottenham Hotspur	
October	2015	Arsène Wenger	France	Arsenal	
November	2015	Claudio Ranieri	Italy	Leicester City	
December	2015	Quique Sánchez Flores	Spain	Watford	
January	2016	Ronald Koeman	Netherlands	Southampton	
February	2016	Mauricio Pochettino	Argentina	Tottenham Hotspur	
March	2016	Claudio Ranieri	Italy	Leicester City	
April	2016	Claudio Ranieri	Italy	Leicester City	
August	2016	Mike Phelan	England	Hull City	
September	2016	Jürgen Klopp	Germany	Liverpool	
October	2016	Antonio Conte	Italy	Chelsea	
November	2016	Antonio Conte	Italy	Chelsea	
December	2016	Antonio Conte	Italy	Chelsea	
January	2017	Paul Clement	England	Swansea City	
February	2017	Pep Guardiola	Spain	Manchester City	
March	2017	Eddie Howe	England	Bournemouth	
April	2017	Mauricio Pochettino	Argentina	Tottenham Hotspur	
August	2017	David Wagner	United States	Huddersfield Town	
September	2017	Pep Guardiola	Spain	Manchester City	
October	2017	Pep Guardiola	Spain	Manchester City	
November	2017	Pep Guardiola	Spain	Manchester City	
December	2017	Pep Guardiola	Spain	Manchester City	
January	2018	Eddie Howe	England	Bournemouth	
February	2018	Chris Hughton	Ireland	Brighton & Hove Albion	
March	2018	Sean Dyche	England	Burnley	
April	2018	Darren Moore	Jamaica	West Bromwich Albion	
August	2018	Javi Gracia	Spain	Watford	
September	2018	Nuno Espírito Santo	Portugal	Wolverhampton Wanderers	
October	2018	Eddie Howe	England	Bournemouth	
November	2018	Rafael Benítez	Spain	Newcastle United	
December	2018	Jürgen Klopp	Germany	Liverpool	
January	2019	Ole Gunnar Solskjær	Norway	Manchester United	
February	2019	Pep Guardiola	Spain	Manchester City	
March	2019	Jürgen Klopp	Germany	Liverpool	
April	2019	Pep Guardiola	Spain	Manchester City	
August	2019	Jürgen Klopp	Germany	Liverpool	
September	2019	Jürgen Klopp	Germany	Liverpool	
October	2019	Frank Lampard	England	Chelsea	
November	2019	Jürgen Klopp	Germany	Liverpool	
December	2019	Jürgen Klopp	Germany	Liverpool	
January	2020	Jürgen Klopp	Germany	Liverpool	
February	2020	Sean Dyche	England	Burnley	
June	2020	Nuno Espírito Santo	Portugal	Wolverhampton Wanderers	
July	2020	Ralph Hasenhüttl	Austria	Southampton	
September	2020	Carlo Ancelotti	Italy	Everton	
October	2020	Nuno Espírito Santo	Portugal	Wolverhampton Wanderers	
November	2020	José Mourinho	Portugal	Tottenham Hotspur	
December	2020	Dean Smith	England	Aston Villa	
January	2021	Pep Guardiola	Spain	Manchester City	
February	2021	Pep Guardiola	Spain	Manchester City	
March	2021	Thomas Tuchel	Germany	Chelsea	
April	2021	Steve Bruce	England	Newcastle United	
May	2021	Jürgen Klopp	Germany	Liverpool	
August	2021	Nuno Espírito Santo	Portugal	Tottenham Hotspur	
September	2021	Mikel Arteta	Spain	Arsenal	
October	2021	Thomas Tuchel	Germany	Chelsea	
November	2021	Pep Guardiola	Spain	Manchester City	
December	2021	Pep Guardiola	Spain	Manchester City	
January	2022	Bruno Lage	Portugal	Wolverhampton Wanderers	
February	2022	Eddie Howe	England	Newcastle United	
March	2022	Mikel Arteta	Spain	Arsenal	
April	2022	Mike Jackson	England	Burnley	
August	2022	Mikel Arteta	Spain	Arsenal	
September	2022	Erik ten Hag	Netherlands	Manchester United	
October	2022	Eddie Howe	England	Newcastle United	
November/ December (Note: The Premier League was on hold during the 2022 FIFA World Cup, so November and December were treated as one month.)	2022	Mikel Arteta	Spain	Arsenal	
January	2023	Mikel Arteta	Spain	Arsenal	
February	2023	Erik ten Hag	Netherlands	Manchester United	
March	2023	Mikel Arteta	Spain	Arsenal	
April	2023	Unai Emery	Spain	Aston Villa	
August	2023	Ange Postecoglou	Australia	Tottenham Hotspur	
September	2023	Ange Postecoglou	Australia	Tottenham Hotspur	
October	2023	Ange Postecoglou	Australia	Tottenham Hotspur	
November	2023	Erik ten Hag	Netherlands	Manchester United	
December	2023	Unai Emery	Spain	Aston Villa	
January	2024	Jürgen Klopp	Germany	Liverpool	
February	2024	Mikel Arteta	Spain	Arsenal	
March	2024	Andoni Iraola	Spain	Bournemouth	
April	2024	Sean Dyche	England	Everton	
August	2024	Fabian Hürzeler	Germany	Brighton & Hove Albion	
September	2024	Enzo Maresca	Italy	Chelsea	
October	2024	Nuno Espírito Santo	Portugal	Nottingham Forest	
November	2024	Arne Slot	Netherlands	Liverpool	
December	2024	Nuno Espírito Santo	Portugal	Nottingham Forest	
January	2025	Andoni Iraola	Spain	Bournemouth	
February	2025	David Moyes	Scotland	Everton	
March	2025	Nuno Espírito Santo	Portugal	Nottingham Forest	
April	2025	Vítor Pereira	Portugal	Wolverhampton Wanderers	
August	2025	Arne Slot	Netherlands	Liverpool	
September	2025	Oliver Glasner	Austria	Crystal Palace	
October	2025	Ruben Amorim	Portugal	Manchester United	
November	2025	Enzo Maresca	Italy	Chelsea	
December	2025	Unai Emery	Spain	Aston Villa	
January	2026	Michael Carrick	England	Manchester United	
February	2026	Pep Guardiola	Spain	Manchester City	
March	2026	Mikel Arteta	Spain	Arsenal	
April	2026	Pep Guardiola	Spain	Manchester City	
August	2026	Sergej Jakirović	Bosnia and Herzegovina	Hull City	
September	2026	Fabian Hürzeler	Germany	Brighton & Hove Albion	
October	2026	Roberto De Zerbi	Italy	Tottenham Hotspur	

== Multiple winners ==
The following table lists the number of awards won by managers who have won at least two Manager of the Month awards.

Managers in bold are still active in the Premier League.

As of October 2026 award

Rank	Managers	Wins
1st	(Scotland) Alex Ferguson	27
2nd	(France) Arsène Wenger	15
3rd	(Spain) Pep Guardiola	13
4th	(Scotland) **David Moyes**	11
5th	(Germany) Jürgen Klopp	10
6th	(Spain) **Mikel Arteta**	8
6th	(Northern Ireland) Martin O'Neill	8
6th	(England) Harry Redknapp	8
9th	(Spain) Rafael Benítez	7
9th	(Portugal) Nuno Espírito Santo	7
11th	(England) Sam Allardyce	6
11th	(England) Bobby Robson	6
13th	(Italy) Carlo Ancelotti	5
13th	(England) Eddie Howe	5
13th	(England) Kevin Keegan	5
13th	(Italy) Claudio Ranieri	5
17th	(England) Roy Hodgson	4
17th	(Republic of Ireland) Joe Kinnear	4
17th	(Portugal) José Mourinho	4
17th	(Chile) Manuel Pellegrini	4
17th	(Argentina) Mauricio Pochettino	4
17th	(Scotland) Gordon Strachan	4
23rd	(Italy) Antonio Conte	3
23rd	(England) Alan Curbishley	3
23rd	(England) Sean Dyche	3
23rd	(Spain) **Unai Emery**	3
23rd	(France) Gérard Houllier	3
23rd	(Netherlands) Ronald Koeman	3
23rd	(Republic of Ireland) David O'Leary	3
23rd	(England) Alan Pardew	3
23rd	(England) Stuart Pearce	3
23rd	(Australia) Ange Postecoglou	3
23rd	(Northern Ireland) Brendan Rodgers	3
23rd	(Netherlands) Erik ten Hag	3
35th	(England) Frank Clark	2
35th	(England) Steve Coppell	2
35th	(Republic of Ireland) Owen Coyle	2
35th	(Scotland) Kenny Dalglish	2
35th	(England) Roy Evans	2
35th	(England) John Gregory	2
35th	(England) Glenn Hoddle	2
35th	(Germany) **Fabian Hürzeler**	2
35th	(Spain) Andoni Iraola	2
35th	(England) Paul Jewell	2
35th	(Italy) Roberto Mancini	2
35th	(Italy) Enzo Maresca	2
35th	(Wales) Tony Pulis	2
35th	(England) Peter Reid	2
35th	(Netherlands) Arne Slot	2
35th	(Scotland) Graeme Souness	2
35th	(England) Phil Thompson	2
35th	(Germany) Thomas Tuchel	2
35th	(Portugal) André Villas-Boas	2

== Awards won by nationality ==
As of October 2026 award

Nationality	Managers	Wins
England	47	91
Scotland	10	51
Spain	9	36
Italy	7	19
France	2	18
Portugal	6	16
Germany	3	14
Northern Ireland	3	12
Ireland	4	10
Netherlands	4	9
Wales	3	4
Argentina	1	4
Chile	1	4
Australia	1	3
Austria	2	2
Bosnia and Herzegovina	1	1
Israel	1	1
Jamaica	1	1
Norway	1	1
Sweden	1	1
United States	1	1

== Awards won by club ==
As of October 2026 award

Club	Managers	Wins
Manchester United	5	33
Liverpool	6	25
Manchester City	6	23
Arsenal	2	23
Chelsea	9	19
Tottenham Hotspur	9	17
Newcastle United	6	17
Everton	5	15
Southampton	7	11
Aston Villa	5	11
Leicester City	4	8
Bolton Wanderers	3	7
Blackburn Rovers	4	6
Nottingham Forest	3	6
West Ham United	4	5
Leeds United	3	5
Wolverhampton Wanderers	3	5
Bournemouth	2	5
West Bromwich Albion	4	4
Wimbledon	1	4
Hull City	3	3
Middlesbrough	3	3
Sheffield Wednesday	3	3
Swansea City	3	3
Brighton & Hove Albion	2	3
Burnley	2	3
Coventry City	2	3
Reading	2	3
Sunderland	2	3
Wigan Athletic	2	3
Charlton Athletic	1	3
Portsmouth	1	3
Crystal Palace	2	2
Watford	2	2
Fulham	1	2
Birmingham City	1	1
Derby County	1	1
Huddersfield Town	1	1
Ipswich Town	1	1
Norwich City	1	1
Oldham Athletic	1	1
Queens Park Rangers	1	1

== See also ==
- Premier League Manager of the Season
- Premier League Player of the Month
- Premier League Goal of the Month
- Premier League Save of the Month
