= Dave Merrington =

English footballer (born 1945)

Personal information
- Full name: David Robert Merrington
- Date of birth: 26 January 1945 (age 81)
- Place of birth: Newcastle, England
- Position: Centre back

Senior career*
Years	Team	Apps	(Gls)
1964–1971	Burnley	98	(1)
- Bristol City

Managerial career
- 1978: Sunderland (caretaker)
- 1980: Leeds United (caretaker)
- 1995–1996: Southampton
- * Club domestic league appearances and goals

David Robert Merrington (born 26 January 1945) is an English former professional footballer, manager and commentator. He served as a caretaker manager at Sunderland in 1978, and Leeds United in 1980. Merrington was manager of Southampton from 1995 until his dismissal in 1996.

Before his career as a coach, Merrington played as a defender, spending the majority of his playing career at Burnley before moving to Bristol City. Merrington later worked as a commentator for BBC Radio Solent. He retired from commentating in 2022.

== Playing career ==
Merrington played for Burnley, appearing in 98 league games (1 goal), including a spell as captain. Whilst at Burnley, he was blighted continually by serious injuries. He later played for Bristol City before retiring and going into coaching.

== Coaching career ==
Merrington was a brief caretaker manager for Sunderland following the departure of Jimmy Adamson in 1978, and in 1980 he again took over from Adamson as caretaker manager (for 1 game only) at Leeds United.

He became youth coach at Southampton in 1983, before taking over as manager for the 1995–96 season. He was Premiership Manager of the Month in April 1996, his only full season in management. Despite securing Southampton's top flight status on goal difference, he was dismissed on 14 June 1996 and succeeded by Graeme Souness. During the final weeks of the 1995–96 season, he guided Southampton to two crucial wins which played a big part in their survival - they first beat Manchester United (champions that season) 3–1 at The Dell, and then won their penultimate game 1–0 at Bolton Wanderers, a result which confirmed the other side's relegation.

A year later he returned to the club as a coach under next manager Dave Jones but left again three years later after Jones was succeeded by Glenn Hoddle. His next stop was a brief spell working as Walsall's first-team coach alongside manager Colin Lee in 2002, but later resigned for personal reasons.

== Media career ==
Merrington worked for BBC Radio Solent, commentating on Southampton matches. Merrington retired from commentary at the end of the 2021–22 season.

== Honours ==
=== Manager ===
Individual

- Premier League Manager of the Month: April 1996
