= UEFA Respect Fair Play ranking =

Football culture aspect under UEFA leagues body

The UEFA Respect Fair Play ranking was used by UEFA from 1995 to the 2015–16 season to grant three berths for the first qualifying round of the UEFA Europa League. Since that time it has granted a monetary prize to winning associations.

== Qualification system ==
=== 1995–1998 ===
The three highest-performing associations in the UEFA Fair Play ranking were given an extra UEFA Cup berth for the best-finishing team in their top division who have not qualified for the following season's UEFA Champions League, UEFA Cup Winners' Cup or UEFA Cup. Which round the teams started from depended on their association's UEFA coefficient.

=== 1999–2008 ===
The highest-finishing club in the Fair Play rankings of a qualifying association, not yet participating in either the UEFA Champions League or the UEFA Cup (the UEFA Cup Winners' Cup became defunct after 1998–99), were potential contenders for the three remaining berths. The club from the association which won the Fair Play ranking qualified automatically for the First Qualifying Round of the UEFA Cup. The two other associations were drawn from the rest that have reached the threshold of minimum games and had a score of at least 8.0.

=== 2009–2015 ===
The three highest placed national associations in the UEFA Respect Fair Play ranking each automatically gained an extra qualification berth for the first qualifying round of the UEFA Europa League, providing they exceeded the threshold of games played, and had a minimum average score of 8.0. These berths were then allocated to the highest placed club in that association's own Fair Play league that had not yet qualified a UEFA competition.

=== 2015–present ===
Based upon a UEFA Executive Committee decision, approved in December 2014, from the 2015–16 season onwards, Fair Play no longer grants entry to the Europa League, instead only netting the victorious association a cash prize to be put towards "fair play or respect-themed projects". It is assessed on three categories: overall fair play, year-on-year fair play (most improved association) and spectator behaviour, with each association being scored and an association being declared the winner for each category. No association can win more than one category, meaning that on receiving one category award, an association becomes ineligible to win either of the other two, with the three categories being ranked in importance so that it can be determined which category takes preference.

== Ranking ==
All representative teams from a football association are responsible for the score of the Fair Play ranking of that association. This includes matches of all national teams and all clubs in all UEFA competitions. The ranking assessment period was also changed in 2015, and is now from 1 July to 30 June the following year. For the transitional season of 2015–16, the ranking assessment period covered all matches between 1 May 2015 and 30 June 2016).

=== Criteria ===
Teams are judged on the following criteria:

- Yellow and red cards: If no cards are shown the score will be 10. Every yellow card will deduct this total by 1. A red card will cost a team 3 points in the ranking. If the red card is the result of a second yellow card, the deductions of the second yellow card will be ignored. But if a player gets a direct red card after he got a yellow card earlier, the yellow card will be counted as a deduction. This score could become negative.
- Positive play: e.g. attacking tactics, acceleration of the game, efforts to gain time, and continued pursuit of goals. A team can score a maximum of 10 points and a minimum of 1 point
- Respect to the opponent: e.g. returning the ball to the opponent at a throw-in, helping an injured opponent: maximum 5 points, minimum 1 point
- Respect to the referee: maximum 5 points, minimum 1 point
- Behaviour of the team officials: maximum 5 points, minimum 1 point
- Behaviour of the fans: maximum 5 points, minimum 1 point

NB: this criterion is ignored when the number of fans is negligible e.g. if there are no fans at all or because of penalty that was given by the UEFA

The total number of points are divided by the maximum number of points, 40 (or 35 if there are a negligible number of fans), and multiplied by 10 which will result in a score between 0 and 10. The score is calculated to two decimal points and not rounded up.

=== 2014–15 final ranking ===
The ranking below covers matches from 1 May 2014 to 30 April 2015 and is the final ranking.

The top three associations (Netherlands, England, Republic of Ireland) gained an extra qualification berth for the 2015–16 UEFA Europa League first qualifying round.

| Rank | Member association | Total points | Matches played |
|---|---|---|---|
| 1 | Netherlands | 8.151 | 110 |
| 2 | England | 8.146 | 160 |
| 3 | Republic of Ireland | 8.144 | 66 |
| 4 | Finland | 8.141 | 68 |
| 5 | Denmark | 8.128 | 88 |
| 6 | Germany | 8.123 | 146 |
| 7 | Norway | 8.113 | 71 |
| 8 | Iceland | 8.089 | 53 |
| 9 | Sweden | 8.087 | 110 |
| 10 | Scotland | 8.083 | 95 |
| 11 | Spain | 8.039 | 159 |
| 12 | Austria | 8.015 | 71 |
| 13 | Northern Ireland | 8.003 | 47 |
| 14 | Switzerland | 8.001 | 96 |
| 15 | Belgium | 7.967 | 107 |
| 16 | France | 7.960 | 115 |
| 17 | Italy | 7.953 | 147 |
| 18 | Czech Republic | 7.928 | 75 |
| 19 | Wales | 7.924 | 52 |
| 20 | Poland | 7.911 | 72 |
| 21 | Kazakhstan | 7.879 | 59 |
| 22 | Russia | 7.872 | 126 |
| 23 | Faroe Islands | 7.868 | 43 |
| 24 | Armenia | 7.864 | 72 |
| 25 | Slovenia | 7.848 | 71 |
| 26 | Israel | 7.843 | 55 |
| 27 | Lithuania | 7.824 | 55 |
| 28 | Romania | 7.811 | 80 |
| 29 | Cyprus | 7.790 | 69 |
| 30 | Portugal | 7.768 | 128 |
| 31 | Slovakia | 7.765 | 76 |
| 32 | Croatia | 7.760 | 86 |
| 33 | Estonia | 7.753 | 52 |
| 34 | Serbia | 7.749 | 76 |
| 35 | Bosnia and Herzegovina | 7.742 | 55 |
| 36 | Hungary | 7.738 | 68 |
| 37 | Ukraine | 7.700 | 122 |
| 38 | Greece | 7.694 | 84 |
| 39 | (Georgia (country)) Georgia | 7.684 | 45 |
| 40 | Belarus | 7.678 | 83 |
| 41 | Moldova | 7.642 | 53 |
| 42 | Turkey | 7.615 | 90 |
| 43 | Malta | 7.600 | 45 |
| 44 | Montenegro | 7.592 | 44 |
| 45 | Latvia | 7.565 | 49 |
| 46 | (North Macedonia) Macedonia | 7.500 | 51 |
| 47 | Azerbaijan | 7.441 | 59 |
| 48 | Albania | 7.348 | 38 |
| 50 | Gibraltar | 7.809 | 21 |
| 51 | Liechtenstein | 7.767 | 18 |
| 52 | Luxembourg | 7.720 | 24 |
| 53 | San Marino | 7.485 | 24 |
| 54 | Andorra | 6.922 | 32 |

Cut-off: 37 matches played
Group 1: 37 or more matches played; Group 2: fewer than 37 matches played.

== Winners (1995–2015) ==
The UEFA Fair Play winners in the rankings by year since 1995 to 2015 were:

| Year | First association | Nominated team | Second association | Nominated team | Third association | Nominated team | References |
|---|---|---|---|---|---|---|---|
| 1995 | Norway | Viking | England | Leeds United | Luxembourg | Avenir Beggen | |
| 1996 | Sweden | Malmö | Russia | CSKA Moscow | Finland | Jazz Pori | (Note: England's Football Association were the top-ranked association for 1996 but were denied their berth (to Everton) by UEFA as punishment for member clubs Tottenham Hotspur and Wimbledon fielding weakened teams in the 1995 UEFA Intertoto Cup.) |
| 1997 | Norway | Brann | England | Aston Villa | Sweden | Örebro | |
| 1998 | England | Aston Villa | Finland | FinnPa | Norway | Molde | |
| Year | Top association | Nominated team | Drawn | | | | References |
| Year | Top association | Nominated team | Association | Nominated team | Association | Nominated team | References |
| 1999 | Scotland | Kilmarnock | Norway | Bodø/Glimt | Estonia | JK Viljandi Tulevik | |
| 2000 | Sweden | Norrköping | Belgium | Lierse | Spain | Rayo Vallecano | |
| 2001 | Belarus | Shakhtyor | Finland | MYPA | Slovakia | Matador Púchov | |
| 2002 | Norway | SK Brann | England | Ipswich Town | (Czech Republic) Czech Republic | Sigma Olomouc | |
| 2003 | England | Manchester City | France | Lens | Denmark | Esbjerg | |
| 2004 | Sweden | Öster | Armenia | Mika | Ukraine | Illichivets Mariupol | |
| 2005 | Norway | Viking | Germany | Mainz 05 | Denmark | Esbjerg | |
| 2006 | Sweden | Gefle | Belgium | Roeselare | Norway | Brann | |
| 2007 | Sweden | Häcken | Finland | MYPA | Norway | Lillestrøm | |
| 2008 | England | Manchester City | Germany | Hertha BSC | Denmark | Nordsjælland | |
| Year | Top association | Nominated team | Second association | Nominated team | Third association | Nominated team | References |
| 2009 | Norway | Rosenborg | Denmark | Randers | Scotland | Motherwell | |
| 2010 | Sweden | Gefle | Denmark | Randers | Finland | MYPA ^{(a)} | |
| 2011 | Norway | Aalesund | England | Fulham | Sweden | Häcken | |
| 2012 | Norway | Stabæk | Finland | MYPA | Netherlands | Twente | |
| 2013 | Sweden | Gefle | Norway | Tromsø | Finland | Mariehamn | |
| 2014 | Norway | Tromsø | Sweden | Brommapojkarna | Finland | MYPA | |
| 2015 | Netherlands | Go Ahead Eagles | England | West Ham United | (Republic of Ireland) Republic of Ireland | UCD | |

Notes:

- Teams that performed the best in a given year when compared to the other two Fair Play qualifiers, either by advancing further or earning more points, are listed in italic.
- (a): Both Randers and MYPA made to the 3rd Qualification round however MYPA had more wins in the tournament.

=== Most wins ===
==== By association ====
| Rank | Association | 1st | 2nd | 3rd |
|---|---|---|---|---|
| 1 | Norway | 8 | 2 | 3 |
| 2 | Sweden | 7 | 1 | 2 |
| 3 | England | 3 | 5 | 0 |
| 4 | Netherlands | 1 | 0 | 1 |
| 4 | Scotland | 1 | 0 | 1 |
| 6 | Belarus | 1 | 0 | 0 |
| 7 | Finland | 0 | 4 | 4 |
| 8 | Denmark | 0 | 2 | 3 |
| 9 | Belgium | 0 | 2 | 0 |
| 9 | Germany | 0 | 2 | 0 |
| 11 | Armenia | 0 | 1 | 0 |
| 11 | France | 0 | 1 | 0 |
| 11 | Russia | 0 | 1 | 0 |
| 14 | (Czech Republic) Czech Republic | 0 | 0 | 1 |
| 14 | Estonia | 0 | 0 | 1 |
| 14 | Luxembourg | 0 | 0 | 1 |
| 14 | (Republic of Ireland) Republic of Ireland | 0 | 0 | 1 |
| 14 | Slovakia | 0 | 0 | 1 |
| 14 | Spain | 0 | 0 | 1 |
| 14 | Ukraine | 0 | 0 | 1 |
| Total | | 21 | 21 | 21 |

==== By team ====
| Rank | Team | 1st | 2nd | 3rd |
|---|---|---|---|---|
| 1 | (Sweden) Gefle | 3 | 0 | 0 |
| 2 | (Norway) Brann | 2 | 0 | 1 |
| 3 | (England) Manchester City | 2 | 0 | 0 |
| 3 | (Norway) Viking | 2 | 0 | 0 |
| 5 | (Norway) Tromsø | 1 | 1 | 0 |
| 6 | (England) Aston Villa | 1 | 1 | 0 |
| 7 | (Sweden) Häcken | 1 | 0 | 1 |
| 7 | (Sweden) Malmö | 1 | 0 | 0 |
| 7 | (Scotland) Kilmarnock | 1 | 0 | 0 |
| 7 | (Sweden) Norrköping | 1 | 0 | 0 |
| 7 | (Belarus) Shakhtyor | 1 | 0 | 0 |
| 7 | (Sweden) Öster | 1 | 0 | 0 |
| 7 | (Norway) Rosenborg | 1 | 0 | 0 |
| 7 | (Norway) Aalesund | 1 | 0 | 0 |
| 7 | (Norway) Stabæk | 1 | 0 | 0 |
| 7 | (Netherlands) Go Ahead Eagles | 1 | 0 | 0 |
| 17 | (Finland) MYPA | 0 | 3 | 2 |
| 18 | (Denmark) Randers | 0 | 2 | 0 |

=== Best performances ===
The furthest that a team progressed from a fair-play entry was the quarter-finals, achieved by Aston Villa (1997–98), Rayo Vallecano (2000–01) and Manchester City (2008–09), with Manchester City being the only team to have progressed beyond the group stage since this was introduced in 2004–05.

== Winners (since 2015–16 season) ==
The UEFA Fair Play winners by category in the rankings (with updated format) are:

| Season | Overall fair play | Best spectators | Best progression | Prize money | Reference |
|---|---|---|---|---|---|
| 2015–16 | Norway | Estonia | Belarus | €50,000 for each | |
| 2016–17 | Iceland | Finland | (Georgia (country)) Georgia | €50,000 for each | |
| 2017–18 | Finland | Faroe Islands | Northern Ireland | €50,000 for each | |
| 2018–19 | Finland | Faroe Islands | (Georgia (country)) Georgia | €50,000 for each | |

== See also ==
- UEFA coefficient
