= Arsenal F.C. league record by opponent =

Arsenal's league record based on their opponent

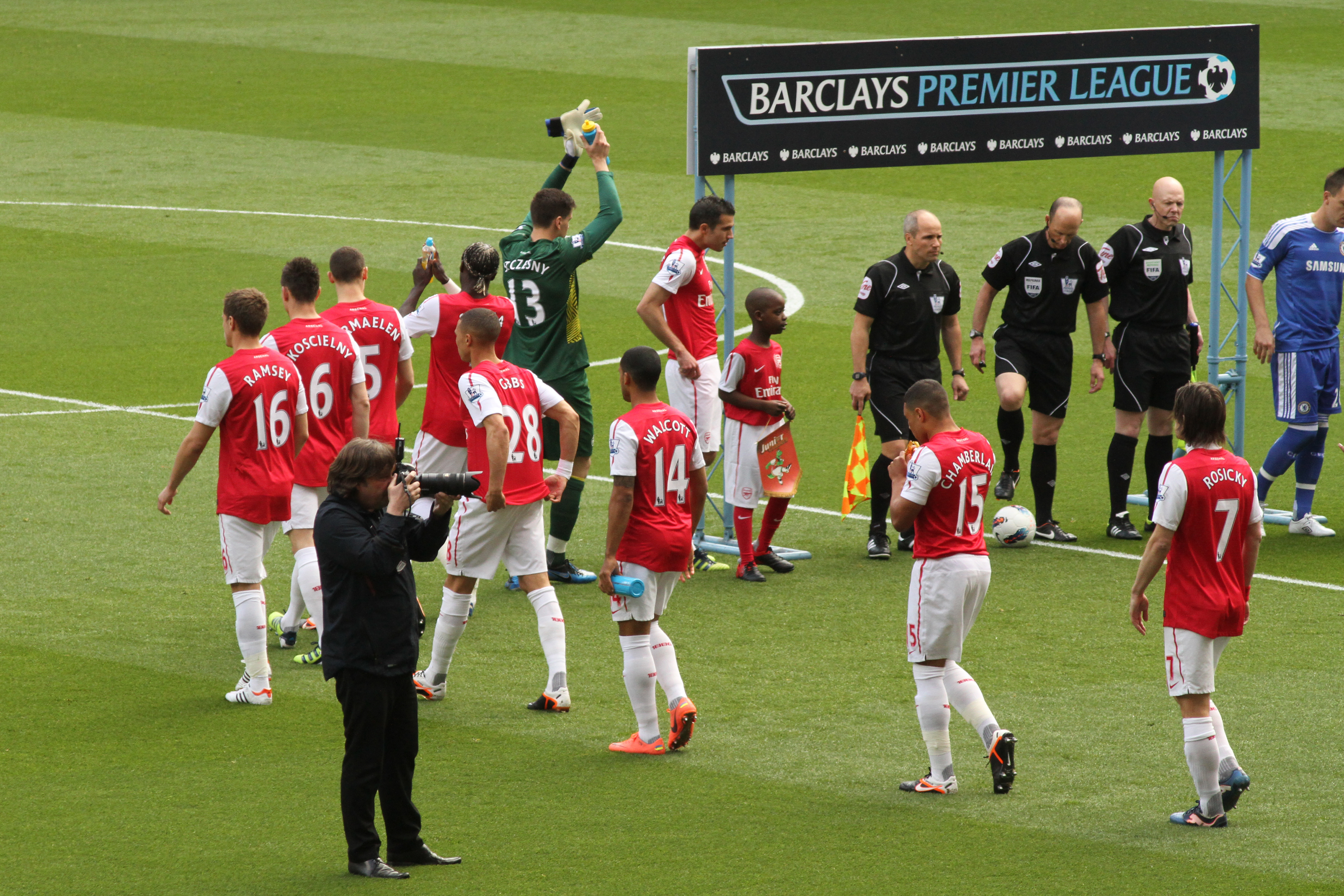
Arsenal players lining up prior to a league match against Chelsea in April 2012.

Arsenal Football Club is an English professional association football club based in Holloway, London. The club was formed in Woolwich in 1886 as Royal Arsenal before it was renamed Woolwich Arsenal in 1893. They became the first southern member admitted into the Football League in 1893, having spent their first four seasons solely participating in cup tournaments and friendlies. The club's name was shortened to Arsenal in 1914, a year after moving to Highbury. In spite of finishing fifth in the Second Division in 1915, Arsenal rejoined the First Division at the expense of local rivals Tottenham Hotspur when football resumed after the First World War. Since that time, they have not fallen below the first tier of the English football league system and hold the record for the longest uninterrupted period in the top flight. The club remained in the Football League until 1992, when its First Division was superseded as English football's top level by the newly formed Premier League, of which they were an inaugural member. In 2003–04, Arsenal completed a league season without a single defeat, something achieved only once before in English football, by Preston North End in 1888–89.

Arsenal's first team have competed in a number of national, and in the early part of the club's history, regionally contested leagues such as the United League, the Southern District Combination and the London League Premier Division. Their record against each club faced in these discontinued competitions, in addition to the Football League and Premier League is listed below. Arsenal's first Football League match was against Newcastle United, and they met their 85th and most recent different league opponent, Bournemouth, for the first time in the 2015–16 Premier League season. The team that Arsenal have played most in league competition is Manchester United, who they first met in the 1894–95 Football League season; the 83 defeats from 204 meetings is more than they have lost against any other club. Liverpool have drawn 52 league encounters with Arsenal, more than any other club. Arsenal have recorded more league victories against Everton than against any other club, having beaten them 100 times out of 202 attempts and becoming the first team in English history to attain a century of wins against another club.

== Key ==
- The table includes results of matches played by Arsenal (including under the former names of Royal Arsenal and Woolwich Arsenal) in the United League, the Southern District Combination, the London League Premier Division, the Football League and the Premier League. Matches from the abandoned 1939–40 season are excluded, as are the games in the various wartime competitions.
- The name used for each opponent is the name they had when Arsenal most recently played a league match against them. Results against each opponent include results against that club under any former name. For example, results against Birmingham City include matches played against Small Heath (1888–1905) and Birmingham (1905–1945).
- The columns headed "First" and "Last" contain the first and most recent seasons in which Arsenal played league matches against each opponent.
- Pld = matches played; W = matches won; D = matches drawn; L = matches lost; Win% = percentage of total matches won
- † Clubs with this background and symbol in the "Opponent" column are Arsenal's divisional rivals in the current season.
- ‡ Clubs with this background and symbol in the "Opponent" column are defunct.

== All-time league record ==
Statistics correct as of matches played on 18 October 2021.

Arsenal F.C. league record by opponent
Club	Pld	W	D	L	Pld	W	D	L	Pld	W	D	L	Win%	First	Last	Notes
Club	Home				Away				Total				Win%	First	Last	Notes
Aston Villa †	88	48	17	23	87	27	22	38	178	75	39	64	42.13	1904–05	2020–21	
Barnsley	9	8	0	1	9	1	1	7	18	9	1	8	50.00	1898–89	1997–98	
Birmingham City	62	40	18	4	62	17	15	30	124	57	33	34	45.97	1893–94	2010–11	(Note: Record against Small Heath and Birmingham included)
Blackburn Rovers	54	31	15	8	54	21	15	18	108	52	30	26	48.15	1904–05	2011–12	
Blackpool	37	27	8	2	37	13	13	11	74	40	21	13	54.05	1896–97	2010–11	
Bolton Wanderers	59	36	16	7	59	15	16	28	118	51	32	35	43.22	1899–1900	2011–12	
Bournemouth †	5	5	0	0	4	2	1	1	10	7	2	1	70.00	2015–16	2019–20	
Bradford City	11	6	2	3	11	3	3	5	22	9	5	8	40.91	1903–04	2000–01	
Bradford Park Avenue	3	3	0	0	3	2	1	0	6	5	1	0	83.33	1913–14	1920–21	
Brentford †	5	1	3	1	6	1	0	5	11	2	3	6	18.18	1935–36	2021–22	
Brighton & Hove Albion †	6	4	2	0	7	2	2	3	14	8	2	4	57.14	1979–80	2020–21	
Brighton United ‡	1	1	0	0	1	0	1	0	2	1	1	0	50.00	1898–99	1898–99	(Note: First played in the United League)
Bristol City	16	8	4	4	16	11	2	3	32	19	6	7	59.38	1898–99	1979–80	
Burnley	49	31	9	9	50	24	11	15	99	55	20	24	55.56	1897–98	2020–21	
Burton Swifts ‡	8	6	1	1	8	3	0	5	16	9	1	6	56.25	1893–94	1900–01	
Burton United ‡	3	2	0	1	3	0	0	3	6	2	0	4	33.33	1901–02	1903–04	
Burton Wanderers ‡	3	2	1	0	3	1	0	2	6	3	1	2	50.00	1894–95	1896–97	
Bury	16	12	2	2	16	1	5	10	32	13	7	12	40.63	1894–95	1928–29	
Cardiff City	17	9	5	3	17	6	6	5	34	15	11	8	44.12	1921–22	2018–19	
Carlisle United	1	1	0	0	1	0	0	1	2	1	0	1	50.00	1974–75	1974–75	
Charlton Athletic	26	16	5	5	26	16	6	4	52	32	11	9	61.54	1936–37	2006–07	
Chatham	1	1	0	0	1	1	0	0	2	2	0	0	100.00	1899–1900	1899–1900	(Note: First played in the Southern District Combination)
Chelsea †	83	38	23	22	82	25	26	31	165	63	49	53	38.18	1907–08	2021–22	
Chesterfield Town	5	5	0	0	5	2	1	2	10	7	1	2	70.00	1899–1900	1903–04	
Coventry City †	34	20	9	5	34	17	9	8	68	37	18	13	54.41	1967–68	2000–01	
Crewe Alexandra	3	3	0	0	3	1	2	0	6	4	2	0	66.67	1893–94	1896–97	
Crystal Palace †	20	14	4	2	20	10	8	2	40	24	12	4	60.00	1969–70	2020–21	
Darwen	5	4	0	1	5	2	1	2	10	6	1	3	60.00	1894–95	1898–99	
Derby County	49	27	10	12	49	14	10	25	98	41	20	37	41.84	1904–05	2007–08	
Doncaster Rovers	2	2	0	0	2	1	0	1	4	3	0	1	75.00	1901–02	1902–03	
Everton †	98	66	16	16	98	31	26	41	200	98	43	59	49.00	1904–05	2020–21	
Fulham †	29	24	5	0	29	15	5	9	60	40	11	9	66.67	1903–04	2020–21	(Note: First played in the London League)
Gainsborough Trinity	8	8	0	0	8	3	2	3	16	11	2	3	68.75	1895–96	1904–05	
Glossop	7	6	1	0	7	6	0	1	14	12	1	1	85.71	1899–1900	1914–15	
Grimsby Town	21	16	4	1	21	4	6	11	42	20	10	12	47.62	1893–94	1958–59	
Huddersfield Town	34	17	9	8	34	12	14	8	68	29	23	16	42.65	1913–14	2018–19	
Hull City †	7	4	2	1	7	6	0	1	14	10	2	2	71.43	1913–14	2016–17	
Ipswich Town †	26	14	6	6	26	13	4	9	52	27	10	15	51.92	1954–55	2001–02	
Kettering Town	3	2	1	0	3	2	0	1	6	4	1	1	66.67	1896–97	1898–99	
Leeds City ‡	2	2	0	0	2	0	2	0	4	2	2	0	50.00	1913–14	1914–15	
Leeds United†	50	27	10	13	50	11	14	25	102	39	25	38	38.24	1924–25	2020–21	
Leicester City	63	40	16	6	63	19	21	23	130	61	38	31	46.92	1894–95	2020–21	(Note: Record against Leicester Fosse included)
Leyton Orient	3	2	1	0	3	1	0	2	6	3	1	2	50.00	1913–14	1962–63	(Note: Record against Clapton Orient included)
Lincoln City	13	10	3	0	13	3	4	6	26	13	7	6	50.00	1893–94	1914–15	
Liverpool †	95	40	33	22	96	24	19	53	194	65	52	77	33.51	1893–94	2020–21	
Loughborough ‡	7	7	0	0	7	3	1	3	14	10	1	3	71.43	1895–96	1899–1900	
Luton Town	22	17	3	2	22	6	8	8	44	23	11	10	52.27	1896–97	1991–92	
Manchester City †	91	53	22	16	92	34	22	36	187	87	44	56	46.52	1893–94	2020–21	(Note: Record against Ardwick included)
Manchester United †	100	55	19	26	101	15	29	57	204	72	49	83	35.29	1894–95	2020–21	(Note: Record against Newton Heath included)
Middlesbrough	60	37	17	6	60	22	15	23	120	59	32	29	49.17	1899–1900	2016–17	
Middlesbrough Ironopolis ‡	1	1	0	0	1	1	0	0	2	2	0	0	100.00	1893–94	1893–94	
Millwall	9	2	3	4	9	2	2	5	18	4	5	9	22.22	1896–97	1989–90	(Note: Record against Millwall Athletic included)
New Brighton Tower ‡	3	3	0	0	3	1	0	2	6	4	0	2	66.67	1898–99	1900–01	
Newcastle United †	84	45	17	22	85	25	19	41	172	73	36	63	42.44	1893–94	2020–21	
Northampton Town	1	0	1	0	1	0	1	0	2	0	2	0	0.00	1965–66	1965–66	
Northwich Victoria	1	1	0	0	1	0	1	0	2	1	1	0	50.00	1893–94	1893–94	
Norwich City	26	17	7	2	25	7	11	7	52	24	19	9	46.15	1960–61	2019–20	
Nottingham Forest †	46	26	14	6	46	19	8	19	92	45	22	25	48.91	1904–05	1998–99	
Notts County	22	11	5	6	22	6	2	14	44	17	7	20	38.64	1893–94	1991–92	
Oldham Athletic	10	4	5	1	10	1	6	3	20	5	11	4	25.00	1910–11	1993–94	
Oxford United	3	2	1	0	3	0	2	1	6	2	3	1	33.33	1985–86	1987–88	
Portsmouth	34	18	9	7	34	11	14	9	68	29	23	16	42.65	1899–1900	2009–10	
Port Vale	9	8	1	0	9	3	2	4	18	11	3	4	61.11	1893–94	1956–57	(Note: Record against Burslem Port Vale included)
Preston North End	36	20	10	6	36	11	7	18	72	31	17	24	43.06	1901–02	1960–61	
Queens Park Rangers	27	19	6	2	27	8	7	12	54	27	13	14	50.00	1899–1900	2014–15	
Reading	5	4	1	0	5	4	1	0	10	8	2	0	80.00	1898–99	2012–13	
Rushden Town ‡	3	3	0	0	3	2	0	1	6	5	0	1	83.33	1896–97	1898–99	
Rotherham Town ‡	3	2	1	0	3	1	1	1	6	3	2	1	50.00	1893–94	1895–96	
Sheffield United	47	30	8	9	48	8	14	26	98	40	23	35	40.82	1904–05	2020–21	
Sheffield Wednesday	54	31	15	8	54	15	15	24	108	46	30	32	42.59	1899–1900	1999–2000	(Note: Record against The Wednesday included)
Southampton	45	29	14	2	45	15	10	20	94	46	26	22	48.94	1897–98	2020–21	
Stockport County	6	6	0	0	6	1	3	2	12	7	3	2	58.33	1900–01	1914–15	
Stoke City	47	37	5	5	47	11	16	20	94	48	21	25	51.06	1904–05	2017–18	(Note: Record against Stoke included)
Sunderland†	70	39	17	15	70	17	23	29	140	56	40	44	40.00	1904–05	2016–17	
Swansea City	9	4	1	4	9	5	0	4	18	9	1	8	50.00	1981–82	2017–18	
Swindon Town	1	0	1	0	1	1	0	0	2	1	1	0	50.00	1993–94	1993–94	
Tottenham Hotspur †	91	47	24	20	89	25	27	37	180	72	51	57	40.00	1896–97	2020–21	
Walsall	7	4	3	0	7	1	0	6	14	5	3	6	35.71	1893–94	1900–01	(Note: Record against Walsall Town Swifts included)
Watford	12	7	1	4	13	6	1	6	26	14	2	10	53.85	1982–83	2019–20	
Wellingborough Town	3	3	0	0	3	1	0	2	6	4	0	2	66.67	1896–97	1898–99	
West Bromwich Albion	64	40	14	10	64	25	15	24	130	67	29	34	51.54	1902–03	2020–21	
West Ham United	64	35	13	16	64	28	21	15	132	66	35	31	50.00	1901–02	2020–21	
Wigan Athletic	8	7	0	1	8	5	2	1	16	12	2	2	75.00	2005–06	2012–13	
Wimbledon ‡	14	4	7	3	14	9	1	4	28	13	8	7	46.43	1986–87	1999–2000	(Note: Wimbledon relocated to Milton Keynes in 2003 and were rebranded as Milton Keynes Dons F.C. In 2008 the club renounced all claims to Wimbledon's history, and regarded themselves as a new club founded in 2004.)
Wolverhampton Wanderers	50	27	15	8	50	20	11	19	104	48	27	29	46.15	1904–05	2020–21	
