= 1903–04 Football League =

16th season of the Football League

The Football League
- Season: 1903–04
- Champions: The Wednesday
- Relegated: Stockport County
- New Club in League: Bradford City

The 1903–04 season was the 16th season of The Football League.

== Final league tables ==
Beginning in the 1894–95 season, clubs finishing level on points were separated according to goal average (goals scored divided by goals conceded). In case one or more teams had the same goal difference, this system favoured those teams who had scored fewer goals. The goal average system was eventually scrapped beginning with the 1976–77 season.

During the first six seasons of the league, (up to the 1893–94 season), re-election process concerned the clubs which finished in the bottom four of the league. From the 1894–95 season and until the 1920–21 season the re-election process was required of the clubs which finished in the bottom three of the league.

== First Division ==
First Division
- Season: 1903–04
- Champions: The Wednesday; 2nd English title
- Relegated: Liverpool; West Bromwich Albion
- Matches: 306
- Goals: 939 (3.07 per match)
- Top goalscorer: Steve Bloomer (20 goals)
- Biggest home win: Middlesbrough 6–0 Manchester City (24 October 1903); Sunderland 6–0 Bury (23 January 1904)
- Biggest away win: Nottingham Forest 3–7 Aston Villa (19 December 1903); Nottingham Forest 0–4 Everton (27 February 1904)
- Highest scoring: Nottingham Forest 3–7 Aston Villa (19 December 1903)
- Longest winning run: 8 matches Sheffield United
- Longest unbeaten run: 8 matches Manchester City; Sheffield United
- Longest losing run: 5 matches Liverpool
- Highest attendance: 40,000; Aston Villa 2–1 The Wednesday (26 December 1903); Everton 5–2 Liverpool (1 April 1904)
- Lowest attendance: 1,500; Nottingham Forest 4–2 Stoke (25 November 1903)
- Average attendance: 12,899

Pos	Team	Pld	W	D	L	GF	GA	GAv	Pts	Relegation
1	The Wednesday (C)	34	20	7	7	48	28	1.714	47	
2	Manchester City	34	19	6	9	71	45	1.578	44	
3	Everton	34	19	5	10	59	32	1.844	43	
4	Newcastle United	34	18	6	10	58	45	1.289	42	
5	Aston Villa	34	17	7	10	70	48	1.458	41	
6	Sunderland	34	17	5	12	63	49	1.286	39	
7	Sheffield United	34	15	8	11	62	57	1.088	38	
8	Wolverhampton Wanderers	34	14	8	12	44	66	0.667	36	
9	Nottingham Forest	34	11	9	14	57	57	1.000	31	
10	Middlesbrough	34	9	12	13	46	47	0.979	30	
11	Small Heath	34	11	8	15	39	52	0.750	30	
12	Bury	34	7	15	12	40	53	0.755	29	
13	Notts County	34	12	5	17	37	61	0.607	29	
14	Derby County	34	9	10	15	58	60	0.967	28	
15	Blackburn Rovers	34	11	6	17	48	60	0.800	28	
16	Stoke	34	10	7	17	54	57	0.947	27	
17	Liverpool (R)	34	9	8	17	49	62	0.790	26	Relegation to the Second Division
18	West Bromwich Albion (R)	34	7	10	17	36	60	0.600	24	Relegation to the Second Division

Source: World Football
Rules for classification: 1) Points; 2) Goal average; 3) Goals scored
(C) Champions; (R) Relegated

=== Results ===
Home \ Away	AST	BLB	BRY	DER	EVE	LIV	MCI	MID	NEW	NOT	NTC	SHU	SMH	STK	SUN	WED	WBA	WOL
Aston Villa		2–3	0–2	3–0	3–1	2–1	0–1	2–1	3–1	3–1	4–0	6–1	1–1	3–1	2–0	2–1	3–1	2–0
Blackburn Rovers	0–3		2–2	2–1	0–2	2–3	2–5	1–1	4–0	3–1	3–0	3–0	1–1	2–0	1–3	0–0	2–0	1–1
Bury	2–2	3–0		2–2	0–0	2–2	1–3	1–1	0–3	2–2	3–0	0–1	1–0	2–2	3–1	1–0	2–1	0–0
Derby County	2–2	3–0	2–2		0–1	2–0	2–3	2–2	1–3	2–6	0–1	3–5	4–1	5–0	7–2	0–2	4–2	2–1
Everton	1–0	3–1	2–1	0–1		5–2	1–0	2–0	4–1	0–2	3–1	2–0	5–1	0–1	0–1	2–0	4–0	2–0
Liverpool	1–1	1–2	3–0	3–1	2–2		2–2	1–0	1–0	0–0	2–1	3–0	0–2	0–0	2–1	1–3	1–3	1–2
Manchester City	1–0	1–0	3–0	2–1	1–3	3–2		1–1	1–3	0–0	3–0	0–1	4–0	2–2	2–1	1–1	6–3	4–1
Middlesbrough	2–1	0–2	1–0	0–0	3–0	1–0	6–0		1–3	1–1	1–0	4–1	3–1	2–0	2–3	0–1	2–2	1–2
Newcastle United	1–1	2–1	3–2	0–0	1–0	1–1	1–0	2–1		3–1	4–1	0–1	3–1	1–0	1–3	4–0	1–0	3–0
Nottingham Forest	3–7	0–1	2–2	5–1	0–4	2–1	0–3	1–1	1–0		0–1	1–1	0–1	4–2	3–0	0–1	2–0	5–0
Notts County	0–0	4–2	0–0	2–2	0–3	4–2	0–3	3–2	3–2	1–3		2–1	2–0	1–0	2–1	1–0	2–3	0–2
Sheffield United	1–2	2–2	0–0	3–2	2–1	2–1	5–3	3–0	2–2	2–0	3–1		1–1	1–1	1–2	1–1	4–0	7–2
Small Heath	2–2	2–1	1–0	1–0	1–1	1–2	0–3	2–2	3–0	3–3	2–0	1–3		1–0	2–1	0–0	0–1	3–0
Stoke	2–0	6–2	4–1	1–1	2–3	5–2	1–2	0–0	2–3	2–3	0–2	3–4	1–0		3–1	3–1	5–0	5–1
Sunderland	6–1	2–0	6–0	0–3	2–0	2–1	1–1	3–1	1–1	3–1	4–1	2–1	3–1	3–0		0–1	1–1	2–1
The Wednesday	4–2	3–1	1–1	1–0	1–0	2–1	1–0	4–1	1–1	2–1	2–0	3–0	3–2	1–0	0–0		1–0	4–0
West Bromwich Albion	1–3	2–1	3–2	0–0	0–0	2–2	2–1	0–0	1–2	1–1	0–0	2–2	0–1	3–0	1–1	0–1		1–2
Wolverhampton Wanderers	3–2	1–0	0–0	2–2	2–2	4–2	1–6	2–2	3–2	3–2	1–1	1–0	1–0	0–0	2–1	2–1	1–0	

Updated to match(es) played on unknown. Source:
Legend: Blue = home team win; Yellow = draw; Red = away team win.

=== Maps ===
Locations of the Football League First Division teams

== Second Division ==
Football League Second Division
- Season: 1903–04
- Champions: Preston North End (1st title)
- Failed re-election: Stockport County
- Matches: 306
- Goals: 942 (3.08 per match)
- Top goalscorer: Percy Smith (Preston North End), 26
- Biggest home win: Woolwich Arsenal – Burton United 8–0 (19 Sept 1903); Woolwich Arsenal – Leicester Fosse 8–0 (26 Oct 1903)
- Biggest away win: Blackpool – Burnley 0–5 (13 Feb 1904); Glossop – Manchester United 0–5 (19 Sept 1903)
- Highest scoring: Woolwich Arsenal – Burton United 8–0 (19 Sept 1903); Woolwich Arsenal – Leicester Fosse 8–0 (26 Oct 1903); Glossop – Burnley 6–2 (21 Nov 1903); Burslem Port Vale – Leicester Fosse 6–2 (27 Feb 1904)
- Longest winning run: 8 matches Woolwich Arsenal (5 Sep 1903 – 26 Oct 1903)
- Longest unbeaten run: 13 matches Preston North End (5 Sep 1903 – 5 Dec 1903)
- Longest losing run: 5 matches Burnley (29 Feb 1904 – 26 Mar 1904)

Pos	Team	Pld	W	D	L	GF	GA	GAv	Pts	Promotion or relegation
1	Preston North End (C, P)	34	20	10	4	62	24	2.583	50	Promotion to the First Division
2	Woolwich Arsenal (P)	34	21	7	6	91	22	4.136	49	Promotion to the First Division
3	Manchester United	34	20	8	6	65	33	1.970	48	
4	Bristol City	34	18	6	10	73	41	1.780	42	
5	Burnley	34	15	9	10	50	55	0.909	39	
6	Grimsby Town	34	14	8	12	50	49	1.020	36	
7	Bolton Wanderers	34	12	10	12	59	41	1.439	34	
8	Barnsley	34	11	10	13	38	57	0.667	32	
9	Gainsborough Trinity	34	14	3	17	53	60	0.883	31	
10	Bradford City	34	12	7	15	45	59	0.763	31	
11	Chesterfield Town	34	11	8	15	37	45	0.822	30	
12	Lincoln City	34	11	8	15	41	58	0.707	30	
13	Burslem Port Vale	34	10	9	15	54	52	1.038	29	
14	Burton United	34	11	7	16	45	61	0.738	29	
15	Blackpool	34	11	5	18	40	67	0.597	27	
16	Stockport County (R)	34	8	11	15	40	72	0.556	27	Failed re-election and demoted
17	Glossop	34	10	6	18	57	64	0.891	26	Re-elected
18	Leicester Fosse	34	6	10	18	42	82	0.512	22	Re-elected

(C) Champions; (P) Promoted; (R) Relegated

=== Results ===
Home \ Away	BAR	BLP	BOL	BRA	BRI	BRN	BPV	BRT	CHF	GAI	GLP	GRI	LEI	LIN	MUN	PNE	STP	WOO
Barnsley		2–2	1–0	1–2	2–0	1–1	1–0	2–1	0–0	2–0	4–0	3–1	1–1	2–1	0–2	1–0	0–0	2–1
Blackpool	0–2		1–4	0–1	0–1	0–5	1–0	4–1	0–0	2–1	3–2	3–0	1–2	2–1	2–1	0–3	4–1	2–2
Bolton Wanderers	5–1	3–0		1–0	1–1	1–1	5–0	3–0	4–0	5–0	0–1	4–0	3–1	1–2	0–0	0–2	0–1	2–1
Bradford City	3–1	0–2	3–3		1–0	3–0	1–1	3–0	2–6	1–3	2–1	1–0	4–0	2–1	3–3	1–1	0–0	0–3
Bristol City	2–0	5–0	2–0	1–1		6–0	2–1	4–0	3–2	2–1	5–0	4–0	4–0	3–1	1–1	3–1	6–0	0–4
Burnley	2–2	1–4	0–0	3–2	2–3		1–0	2–1	2–1	2–0	2–4	2–0	2–1	3–1	2–0	2–1	2–0	1–0
Burslem Port Vale	3–0	5–0	2–3	5–2	3–1	2–2		3–1	3–0	3–0	1–1	1–2	6–2	2–2	1–0	0–1	2–0	2–3
Burton United	1–1	1–1	2–1	0–2	2–3	1–2	0–0		4–0	2–1	2–0	1–0	0–0	5–2	2–2	0–0	7–0	3–1
Chesterfield	1–0	2–1	1–1	1–1	1–0	0–0	1–1	2–1		6–1	0–0	0–1	2–0	0–1	0–2	0–1	4–1	1–0
Gainsborough Trinity	4–2	3–1	3–1	3–0	3–1	1–2	3–0	1–2	1–0		0–1	4–2	4–0	0–0	0–1	2–0	2–2	0–2
Glossop	7–0	0–1	3–3	2–0	1–1	6–2	4–1	0–1	0–2	0–2		1–1	5–0	5–0	0–5	2–2	5–1	1–3
Grimsby Town	5–1	4–0	0–0	2–0	2–0	0–0	3–1	4–0	1–0	3–1	2–0		4–3	1–1	3–1	1–1	2–1	2–2
Leicester Fosse	2–0	5–1	2–2	1–2	1–0	0–0	1–1	1–3	0–0	2–2	4–2	1–1		2–2	0–1	1–4	3–0	0–0
Lincoln City	0–0	0–0	1–0	1–0	2–6	3–1	3–2	1–0	0–2	0–1	3–1	2–1	6–1		0–0	0–0	3–1	0–2
Manchester United	4–0	3–1	0–0	3–1	2–2	3–1	2–0	2–0	3–1	4–2	3–1	2–0	5–2	2–0		0–2	3–1	1–0
Preston North End	1–1	1–0	3–1	4–0	3–0	2–0	3–1	4–0	2–1	2–0	3–0	2–0	4–3	2–1	1–1		1–1	0–0
Stockport County	2–2	2–1	3–2	2–0	1–1	2–2	1–1	1–1	2–0	1–4	3–0	1–1	2–0	4–0	0–3	1–5		0–0
Woolwich Arsenal	3–0	3–0	3–0	4–1	2–0	4–0	0–0	8–0	6–0	6–0	2–1	5–1	8–0	4–0	4–0	0–0	5–2	

Updated to match(es) played on unknown. Source: Ian Laschke: Rothmans Book of Football League Records 1888–89 to 1978–79. Macdonald and Jane’s, London & Sydney, 1980.
Legend: Blue = home team win; Yellow = draw; Red = away team win.

=== Maps ===
Locations of the Football League Second Division teams

== Attendances ==
=== Division One ===
No.	Club	Average
1	Aston Villa FC	20,035
2	Manchester City FC	19,870
3	Everton FC	17,845
4	Newcastle United FC	17,565
5	Sheffield United FC	15,790
6	Liverpool FC	15,725
7	Middlesbrough FC	14,335
8	Sunderland AFC	13,670
9	The Wednesday	12,595
10	West Bromwich Albion FC	12,340
11	Birmingham City FC	10,765
12	Notts County FC	9,910
13	Derby County FC	9,650
14	Blackburn Rovers FC	9,395
15	Nottingham Forest FC	8,910
16	Stoke City FC	8,610
17	Bury FC	7,790
18	Wolverhampton Wanderers FC	7,710

== See also ==
- 1903–04 in English football
- 1903 in association football
- 1904 in association football
