= 1902–03 Football League =

15th season of the Football League

The Football League
- Season: 1902–03
- Champions: The Wednesday
- Relegated: Doncaster Rovers

The 1902–03 season was the 15th season of The Football League.

== Final league tables ==
Beginning in the 1894–95 season, clubs finishing level on points were separated according to goal average (goals scored divided by goals conceded). In case one or more teams had the same goal difference, this system favoured those teams who had scored fewer goals. The goal average system was eventually scrapped beginning with the 1976–77 season.

During the first six seasons of the league, (up to the 1893–94 season), re-election process concerned the clubs which finished in the bottom four of the league. From the 1894–95 season and until the 1920–21 season the re-election process was required of the clubs which finished in the bottom three of the league.

== First Division ==
First Division
- Season: 1902–03
- Champions: The Wednesday; 1st English title
- Relegated: Grimsby Town; Bolton Wanderers
- Matches: 306
- Goals: 885 (2.89 per match)
- Top goalscorer: Sam Raybould (31 goals)
- Biggest home win: Aston Villa 7–0 Newcastle United (29 November 1902); Liverpool 9–2 Grimsby Town (6 December 1902)
- Biggest away win: Nottingham Forest 1–4 The Wednesday (1 November 1902)
- Highest scoring: Liverpool 9–2 Grimsby Town (6 December 1902)
- Longest winning run: 6 matches West Bromwich Albion
- Longest unbeaten run: 13 matches Sunderland
- Longest losing run: 10 matches Bolton Wanderers
- Highest attendance: 50,000; Aston Villa 0–3 West Bromwich Albion (1 November 1902)
- Lowest attendance: 500; Derby County 2–2 Grimsby Town (22 April 1903)
- Average attendance: 11,656

Pos	Team	Pld	W	D	L	GF	GA	GAv	Pts	Relegation
1	The Wednesday (C)	34	19	4	11	54	36	1.500	42	
2	Aston Villa	34	19	3	12	61	40	1.525	41	
3	Sunderland	34	16	9	9	51	36	1.417	41	
4	Sheffield United	34	17	5	12	58	44	1.318	39	
5	Liverpool	34	17	4	13	68	49	1.388	38	
6	Stoke	34	15	7	12	46	38	1.211	37	
7	West Bromwich Albion	34	16	4	14	54	53	1.019	36	
8	Bury	34	16	3	15	54	43	1.256	35	
9	Derby County	34	16	3	15	50	47	1.064	35	
10	Nottingham Forest	34	14	7	13	49	47	1.043	35	
11	Wolverhampton Wanderers	34	14	5	15	48	57	0.842	33	
12	Everton	34	13	6	15	45	47	0.957	32	
13	Middlesbrough	34	14	4	16	41	50	0.820	32	
14	Newcastle United	34	14	4	16	41	51	0.804	32	
15	Notts County	34	12	7	15	41	49	0.837	31	
16	Blackburn Rovers	34	12	5	17	44	63	0.698	29	
17	Grimsby Town (R)	34	8	9	17	43	62	0.694	25	Relegation to the Second Division
18	Bolton Wanderers (R)	34	8	3	23	37	73	0.507	19	Relegation to the Second Division

Source: World Football
Rules for classification: 1) Points; 2) Goal average; 3) Goals scored
(C) Champions; (R) Relegated

=== Results ===
Home \ Away	AST	BLB	BOL	BRY	DER	EVE	GRI	LIV	MID	NEW	NOT	NTC	SHU	STK	SUN	WED	WBA	WOL
Aston Villa		5–0	4–2	2–2	0–0	2–1	2–2	1–2	5–0	7–0	3–1	2–1	4–2	2–0	0–1	1–0	0–3	3–1
Blackburn Rovers	0–2		4–2	0–3	2–4	3–2	2–0	3–1	0–1	3–1	2–2	1–2	2–0	1–1	0–2	2–1	1–0	1–0
Bolton Wanderers	0–1	1–2		1–0	2–0	1–3	0–1	1–1	2–1	0–2	1–1	0–1	1–0	2–3	2–0	0–2	0–1	4–1
Bury	0–1	1–1	3–0		1–0	4–2	2–1	3–1	3–1	1–0	3–1	3–1	3–1	2–1	3–1	4–0	1–2	4–0
Derby County	2–0	1–0	5–0	2–0		0–1	2–2	2–1	3–2	0–0	0–1	4–1	1–0	2–0	5–2	1–0	1–0	3–1
Everton	0–1	0–3	3–1	3–0	2–1		4–2	3–1	3–0	0–1	1–1	2–0	1–0	0–1	0–3	1–1	3–1	2–1
Grimsby Town	0–2	4–1	1–1	2–1	4–1	0–0		3–1	2–2	1–0	0–1	1–1	1–2	2–2	2–4	0–1	4–0	1–2
Liverpool	2–1	5–2	5–1	2–0	3–1	0–0	9–2		5–0	3–0	2–1	0–2	2–4	1–1	1–1	4–2	0–2	4–1
Middlesbrough	1–2	4–0	4–3	1–1	3–1	1–0	2–0	0–2		1–0	2–0	2–1	0–2	1–1	0–1	2–1	1–1	2–0
Newcastle United	2–0	1–0	2–0	1–0	2–1	3–0	1–0	1–2	0–1		0–2	6–1	0–0	5–0	1–0	3–0	1–0	2–4
Nottingham Forest	2–0	2–0	1–2	3–0	2–3	2–2	2–1	1–0	1–0	3–2		0–0	2–2	1–3	5–2	1–4	3–1	2–0
Notts County	2–1	4–0	1–3	1–0	2–1	2–0	0–1	1–2	2–0	2–2	1–1		1–1	3–0	0–0	0–3	3–1	0–0
Sheffield United	2–4	2–1	7–1	1–0	3–2	0–2	3–0	2–0	1–3	2–1	2–0	3–0		1–3	1–0	2–3	1–2	3–0
Stoke	1–0	0–2	2–0	1–0	2–0	2–0	1–1	1–0	0–2	5–0	3–2	0–2	0–1		1–1	4–0	3–0	3–0
Sunderland	1–0	2–2	3–1	3–1	2–0	2–1	5–1	2–1	2–1	0–0	0–1	2–1	0–0	0–0		0–1	0–0	3–0
The Wednesday	4–0	0–0	3–0	2–0	0–1	4–1	1–1	3–1	2–0	3–0	1–0	2–0	0–1	1–0	1–0		3–1	1–1
West Bromwich Albion	1–2	5–3	2–1	1–3	3–0	2–1	1–0	1–2	1–0	6–1	2–0	3–2	3–3	2–1	0–3	2–3		2–2
Wolverhampton Wanderers	2–1	2–0	3–1	3–2	3–0	1–1	3–0	0–2	2–0	3–0	2–1	2–0	1–3	1–0	3–3	2–1	1–2	

Updated to match(es) played on unknown. Source:
Legend: Blue = home team win; Yellow = draw; Red = away team win.

=== Maps ===
Locations of the Football League First Division teams

== Second Division ==
Football League Second Division
- Season: 1902–03
- Champions: Manchester City (2nd title)
- Failed re-election: Doncaster Rovers
- Matches: 306
- Goals: 939 (3.07 per match)
- Top goalscorer: Billie Gillespie, (Manchester City), 30
- Biggest home win: Small Heath – Doncaster Rovers 12–0 (11 Apr 1903)
- Biggest away win: Burton United – Manchester City 0–5 (7 Mar 1903)
- Highest scoring: Small Heath – Doncaster Rovers 12–0 (11 Apr 1903)
- Longest winning run: 6 matches Manchester City (24 Jan 1903 – 7 Mar 1903)
- Longest unbeaten run: 10 matches Manchester City (17 Jan 1903 – 4 Apr 1903); Woolwich Arsenal (27 Dec 1902 – 7 Mar 1903)
- Longest losing run: 5 matches Barnsley (11 Oct 1902 – 24 Nov 1902); Stockport County (6 Dec 1902 – 1 Jan 1903); Leicester Fosse (7 Feb 1903 – 7 Mar 1903)

Pos	Team	Pld	W	D	L	GF	GA	GAv	Pts	Promotion or relegation
1	Manchester City (C, P)	34	25	4	5	95	29	3.276	54	Promotion to the First Division
2	Small Heath (P)	34	24	3	7	74	36	2.056	51	Promotion to the First Division
3	Woolwich Arsenal	34	20	8	6	66	30	2.200	48	
4	Bristol City	34	17	8	9	59	38	1.553	42	
5	Manchester United	34	15	8	11	53	38	1.395	38	
6	Chesterfield Town	34	14	9	11	67	40	1.675	37	
7	Preston North End	34	13	10	11	56	40	1.400	36	
8	Barnsley	34	13	8	13	55	51	1.078	34	
9	Burslem Port Vale	34	13	8	13	57	62	0.919	34	
10	Lincoln City	34	12	6	16	46	53	0.868	30	
11	Glossop	34	11	7	16	43	57	0.754	29	
12	Gainsborough Trinity	34	11	7	16	41	59	0.695	29	
13	Burton United	34	11	7	16	39	59	0.661	29	
14	Blackpool	34	9	10	15	44	59	0.746	28	
15	Leicester Fosse	34	10	8	16	41	65	0.631	28	
16	Doncaster Rovers (R)	34	9	7	18	35	72	0.486	25	Failed re-election and demoted
17	Stockport County	34	7	6	21	38	74	0.514	20	Re-elected
18	Burnley	34	6	8	20	30	77	0.390	20	Re-elected

(C) Champions; (P) Promoted; (R) Relegated

=== Results ===
Home \ Away	BAR	BLP	BRI	BRN	BPV	BRT	CHF	DON	GAI	GLP	LEI	LIN	MCI	MUN	PNE	SMH	STP	WOO
Barnsley		6–0	2–0	3–0	1–0	4–0	2–2	2–0	2–3	0–1	1–2	0–0	0–3	0–0	3–0	3–0	2–1	1–1
Blackpool	3–3		0–1	2–0	2–5	3–3	2–1	4–0	4–0	2–2	2–0	2–3	0–3	2–0	2–2	0–1	2–0	0–0
Bristol City	3–3	0–1		3–0	3–0	3–1	2–1	4–2	1–0	1–1	6–1	0–2	3–2	3–1	2–1	1–1	7–1	1–0
Burnley	1–2	1–1	0–0		3–3	4–1	1–1	1–1	3–2	2–1	1–3	1–0	1–1	0–2	1–1	2–1	3–2	0–3
Burslem Port Vale	2–0	1–1	2–0	3–1		4–2	2–1	3–0	3–1	1–0	2–0	5–1	1–4	1–1	0–0	2–2	3–1	1–1
Burton United	1–1	2–0	0–3	0–0	0–0		1–0	1–0	3–0	2–1	2–3	2–2	0–5	3–1	2–1	0–1	5–1	2–1
Chesterfield	3–0	1–1	3–0	2–0	3–0	1–0		1–1	0–1	10–0	5–0	1–0	0–1	2–0	4–2	1–1	4–1	2–2
Doncaster Rovers	2–0	3–0	0–0	2–1	3–2	1–1	3–4		0–0	4–1	0–0	2–1	1–2	2–2	1–2	1–0	2–0	0–1
Gainsborough Trinity	1–2	0–0	2–1	3–0	1–1	3–1	3–2	3–0		1–1	5–1	4–0	0–3	0–1	1–0	1–0	0–0	0–1
Glossop	2–2	1–0	0–2	2–0	2–1	3–0	0–3	3–0	4–2		1–2	2–0	0–1	1–3	1–0	0–1	3–0	1–2
Leicester Fosse	1–2	2–1	2–2	2–1	2–0	0–1	0–2	0–1	4–1	3–2		0–0	1–1	1–1	1–1	1–3	0–2	0–2
Lincoln City	1–3	0–2	1–1	4–1	4–1	4–0	0–0	4–2	1–0	1–0	1–2		1–0	1–3	2–3	0–1	3–1	2–2
Manchester City	3–2	2–0	2–2	6–0	7–1	2–0	4–2	4–1	9–0	5–2	3–1	3–1		0–2	1–0	4–0	5–0	4–1
Manchester United	2–1	2–2	1–2	4–0	2–1	1–0	2–1	4–0	3–1	1–1	5–1	1–2	1–1		0–1	0–1	0–0	3–0
Preston North End	3–0	3–1	1–0	5–0	5–1	1–1	1–1	5–0	0–0	0–0	2–0	0–1	0–2	3–1		2–1	6–1	2–2
Small Heath	2–1	5–1	2–0	3–0	5–1	2–0	2–1	12–0	1–0	3–1	4–3	3–1	4–0	2–1	3–1		2–0	2–0
Stockport County	4–1	4–0	0–1	3–0	0–4	0–2	2–2	1–0	1–1	2–3	2–2	3–1	0–2	2–1	1–1	1–2		0–1
Woolwich Arsenal	4–0	2–1	2–1	5–1	3–0	3–0	3–0	3–0	6–1	0–0	0–0	2–1	1–0	0–1	3–1	6–1	3–1	

Updated to match(es) played on unknown. Source: Ian Laschke: Rothmans Book of Football League Records 1888–89 to 1978–79. Macdonald and Jane’s, London & Sydney, 1980.
Legend: Blue = home team win; Yellow = draw; Red = away team win.

Wikidata

=== Maps ===
Locations of the Football League Second Division teams

== Attendances ==
=== Division One ===
No.	Club	Average
1	Aston Villa FC	19,790
2	Newcastle United FC	17,450
3	Liverpool FC	15,645
4	Everton FC	15,430
5	Sunderland AFC	15,305
6	West Bromwich Albion FC	14,465
7	The Wednesday	14,015
8	Middlesbrough FC	12,670
9	Sheffield United FC	11,160
10	Bolton Wanderers FC	10,530
11	Derby County FC	9,735
12	Bury FC	9,540
13	Notts County FC	9,440
14	Nottingham Forest FC	8,470
15	Blackburn Rovers FC	8,080
16	Stoke City FC	8,050
17	Wolverhampton Wanderers FC	6,855
18	Grimsby Town FC	5,055

== See also ==
- 1902–03 in English football
- 1902 in association football
- 1903 in association football
