= 1903 in association football =

The following are the association football events of the year 1903 throughout the world.

== Events ==
- May 29 – Bradford City Association Football Club founded

== Winners club national championship ==
- Hungary:
  - Hungarian National Championship I: Ferencvárosi TC, first-time champions
- Italy:
  - Italian Football Championship – Genoa C.F.C.
- Scotland:
  - Scottish Division One – Hibernian
  - Scottish Division Two – Airdrie
  - Scottish Cup – Rangers

== International tournaments ==
- 1903 British Home Championship (February 14 – April 4, 1903)

Shared by England, Scotland & Ireland

== Births ==
- 10 January – Matthias Sindelar, Austrian footballer
- 9 April – Harry Callachan, Scottish footballer
- 10 April – Hugh Adcock, British footballer
- 8 May – Manuel Anatol, French footballer (died 1990)
- 22 June – George Brown, English footballer
- 28 June – André Maschinot, French footballer
- 8 July – Fred Hilton, English professional footballer
- 12 October – Hervé Marc, French footballer
- 11 November – Albert Barrett, British footballer
- 17 November – Tommy Lloyd, English professional footballer (died 1984)
- 18 November
  - Luigi Allemandi, Italian footballer
  - Raul Jorge, Portuguese footballer
- 21 November – John Bruton, British footballer
- 27 November – Wim Anderiesen, Dutch footballer (died 1944)

== Clubs founded ==
- Bradford City
- Hellas Verona
