= 1913–14 Football League =

26th season of the Football League

The Football League
- Season: 1913–14
- Champions: Blackburn Rovers

The 1913–14 season was the 26th season of The Football League.

== Final league tables ==
Beginning in the 1894–95 season, clubs finishing level on points were separated according to goal average (goals scored divided by goals conceded). In case one or more teams had the same goal difference, this system favoured those teams who had scored fewer goals. The goal average system was eventually scrapped beginning with the 1976–77 season.

During the first six seasons of the league, (up to the 1893–94 season), re-election process concerned the clubs which finished in the bottom four of the league. From the 1894–95 season and until the 1920–21 season the re-election process was required of the clubs which finished in the bottom three of the league.

== First Division ==
First Division
- Season: 1913–14
- Champions: Blackburn Rovers; 2nd English title
- Relegated: Preston North End; Derby County
- Matches: 380
- Goals: 1,103 (2.9 per match)
- Top goalscorer: George Elliott (32 goals)
- Biggest home win: Blackburn Rovers 6–0 Middlesbrough (20 September 1913); Blackburn Rovers 6–0 Everton (8 November 1913); Middlesbrough 6–0 Tottenham Hotspur (13 April 1914)
- Biggest away win: Everton 1–5 Sunderland (15 November 1913); Preston North End 1–5 Blackburn Rovers (26 December 1913)
- Highest scoring: Blackburn Rovers 6–2 Liverpool (6 September 1913); Bolton Wanderers 6–2 Oldham Athletic (6 September 1913); Derby County 3–5 Sheffield United (6 September 1913); The Wednesday 2–6 Burnley (3 January 1914)

Pos	Team	Pld	W	D	L	GF	GA	GAv	Pts	Relegation
1	Blackburn Rovers (C)	38	20	11	7	78	42	1.857	51	
2	Aston Villa	38	19	6	13	65	50	1.300	44	
3	Middlesbrough	38	19	5	14	77	60	1.283	43	
4	Oldham Athletic	38	17	9	12	55	45	1.222	43	
5	West Bromwich Albion	38	15	13	10	46	42	1.095	43	
6	Bolton Wanderers	38	16	10	12	65	52	1.250	42	
7	Sunderland	38	17	6	15	63	52	1.212	40	
8	Chelsea	38	16	7	15	46	55	0.836	39	
9	Bradford City	38	12	14	12	40	40	1.000	38	
10	Sheffield United	38	16	5	17	63	60	1.050	37	
11	Newcastle United	38	13	11	14	39	48	0.813	37	
12	Burnley	38	12	12	14	61	53	1.151	36	
13	Manchester City	38	14	8	16	51	53	0.962	36	
14	Manchester United	38	15	6	17	52	62	0.839	36	
15	Everton	38	12	11	15	46	55	0.836	35	
16	Liverpool	38	14	7	17	46	62	0.742	35	
17	Tottenham Hotspur	38	12	10	16	50	62	0.806	34	
18	The Wednesday	38	13	8	17	53	70	0.757	34	
19	Preston North End (R)	38	12	6	20	52	69	0.754	30	Relegation to the Second Division
20	Derby County (R)	38	8	11	19	55	71	0.775	27	Relegation to the Second Division

Source: World Football
Rules for classification: 1) Points; 2) Goal average; 3) Goals scored
(C) Champions; (R) Relegated

=== Results ===
Home \ Away	AST	BLB	BOL	BRA	BUR	CHE	DER	EVE	LIV	MCI	MUN	MID	NEW	OLD	PNE	SHU	SUN	TOT	WED	WBA
Aston Villa		1–3	1–0	0–1	1–0	1–2	3–2	3–1	2–1	1–1	3–1	1–3	1–3	0–0	3–0	3–0	5–0	3–3	2–0	2–0
Blackburn Rovers	0–0		3–2	0–0	0–0	3–1	3–1	6–0	6–2	2–1	0–1	6–0	3–0	2–1	5–0	3–2	3–1	1–1	3–2	2–0
Bolton Wanderers	3–0	1–0		3–0	0–0	1–1	3–1	0–0	2–1	3–0	6–1	1–1	3–1	6–2	0–3	3–1	2–1	3–0	0–1	1–0
Bradford City	0–0	0–2	5–1		1–1	0–0	0–0	0–1	1–0	3–2	1–1	2–3	2–0	0–1	0–0	2–1	0–2	2–1	3–1	1–0
Burnley	4–0	1–2	2–2	2–2		6–1	5–1	2–0	5–2	2–0	1–2	1–2	1–0	2–0	3–4	0–0	0–1	3–1	3–0	0–0
Chelsea	0–3	2–0	2–1	2–1	0–0		2–1	2–0	3–0	1–0	0–2	3–2	0–1	2–1	2–0	2–0	1–1	1–3	2–1	1–1
Derby County	0–2	2–3	3–3	3–1	3–1	0–1		1–0	1–1	2–4	4–2	2–2	2–0	1–2	0–1	3–5	1–1	4–0	1–1	1–2
Everton	1–4	0–0	1–1	1–1	1–1	0–0	5–0		1–2	1–0	5–0	2–0	2–0	0–2	2–0	5–0	1–5	1–1	1–1	2–0
Liverpool	0–1	3–3	2–1	0–1	1–1	3–0	1–0	1–2		4–2	1–2	2–1	0–0	0–3	3–1	2–1	1–3	2–1	1–2	0–0
Manchester City	3–1	1–2	0–1	1–0	4–1	2–1	1–2	1–1	1–0		0–2	1–1	0–1	2–1	1–1	2–1	3–1	2–1	1–2	2–3
Manchester United	0–6	0–0	0–1	1–1	0–1	0–1	3–3	0–1	3–0	0–1		0–1	2–2	4–1	3–0	2–1	3–1	3–1	2–1	1–0
Middlesbrough	5–2	3–0	2–3	1–1	2–1	2–0	3–2	2–0	4–0	2–0	3–1		3–0	0–0	4–1	2–3	3–4	6–0	5–2	3–0
Newcastle United	2–2	0–0	4–3	0–0	3–1	1–0	1–1	0–1	1–2	0–1	0–1	1–0		0–0	2–0	2–1	2–1	2–0	3–1	3–3
Oldham Athletic	0–1	1–1	2–0	3–1	1–1	3–2	0–0	2–0	2–2	1–3	2–2	3–0	3–0		1–0	1–2	2–1	3–0	2–0	2–0
Preston North End	3–2	1–5	1–1	2–1	2–1	3–3	2–0	1–0	0–1	2–2	4–2	4–1	4–1	0–1		2–4	2–2	1–2	5–0	0–2
Sheffield United	3–0	1–1	2–0	1–1	5–0	3–2	2–2	4–1	0–1	1–3	2–0	3–1	2–0	2–1	2–0		1–0	1–4	0–1	1–1
Sunderland	2–0	2–1	3–2	0–1	1–1	2–0	1–0	5–2	1–2	0–0	2–0	4–2	1–2	2–0	3–1	1–2		2–0	0–1	0–0
Tottenham Hotspur	0–2	3–3	3–0	0–0	2–0	1–2	1–1	4–1	0–0	3–1	2–1	0–1	0–0	3–1	1–0	2–1	1–4		1–1	3–0
The Wednesday	2–3	3–1	1–1	1–3	2–6	3–0	1–3	2–2	4–1	2–2	1–3	2–0	0–0	1–2	2–1	2–1	2–1	2–0		1–4
West Bromwich Albion	1–0	2–0	1–1	2–1	4–1	3–1	2–1	1–1	0–1	0–0	2–1	2–1	1–1	2–2	1–0	2–1	2–1	1–1	1–1	

Updated to match(es) played on unknown. Source:
Legend: Blue = home team win; Yellow = draw; Red = away team win.

=== Maps ===
Locations of the Football League First Division London teams
Locations of the Football League First Division teams

== Second Division ==
Football League Second Division
- Season: 1913–14
- Champions: Notts County (2nd title)
- Failed re-election: (none)
- Matches: 380
- Goals: 1,011 (2.66 per match)
- Top goalscorer: Sammy Stevens (Hull City), 28; Jack Peart (Notts County), 28
- Biggest home win: Leeds City – Nottingham Forest 8–0 (29 Nov 1913)
- Biggest away win: Fulham – Bradford Park Avenue 1–6 (21 Feb 1914)
- Highest scoring: Hull City – Wolverhampton Wanderers 7–1 (6 Dec 1914)

Pos	Team	Pld	W	D	L	GF	GA	GAv	Pts	Promotion or relegation
1	Notts County (C, P)	38	23	7	8	77	36	2.139	53	Promotion to the First Division
2	Bradford (Park Avenue) (P)	38	23	3	12	71	47	1.511	49	Promotion to the First Division
3	Woolwich Arsenal	38	20	9	9	54	38	1.421	49	
4	Leeds City	38	20	7	11	76	46	1.652	47	
5	Barnsley	38	19	7	12	51	45	1.133	45	
6	Clapton Orient	38	16	11	11	47	35	1.343	43	
7	Hull City	38	16	9	13	53	37	1.432	41	
8	Bristol City	38	16	9	13	52	50	1.040	41	
9	Wolverhampton Wanderers	38	18	5	15	51	52	0.981	41	
10	Bury	38	15	10	13	39	40	0.975	40	
11	Fulham	38	16	6	16	46	43	1.070	38	
12	Stockport County	38	13	10	15	55	57	0.965	36	
13	Huddersfield Town	38	13	8	17	47	53	0.887	34	
14	Birmingham	38	12	10	16	48	60	0.800	34	
15	Grimsby Town	38	13	8	17	42	58	0.724	34	
16	Blackpool	38	9	14	15	33	44	0.750	32	
17	Glossop	38	11	6	21	51	67	0.761	28	
18	Leicester Fosse	38	11	4	23	45	61	0.738	26	
19	Lincoln City	38	10	6	22	36	66	0.545	26	Re-elected
20	Nottingham Forest	38	7	9	22	37	76	0.487	23	Re-elected

(C) Champions; (P) Promoted

=== Results ===
Home \ Away	BAR	BIR	BLP	BPA	BRI	BRY	CLA	FUL	GLP	GRI	HUD	HUL	LEE	LEI	LIN	NOT	NTC	STP	WOL	WOO
Barnsley		1–1	2–1	1–2	3–0	2–0	2–1	1–0	2–0	3–1	2–1	0–2	1–4	3–0	1–0	5–0	0–1	1–0	2–1	1–0
Birmingham	0–0		0–0	1–2	2–2	1–0	2–0	0–1	6–0	1–2	1–4	1–1	0–2	1–0	2–0	2–0	2–1	3–2	4–1	2–0
Blackpool	3–1	2–2		2–1	0–1	0–1	0–0	1–1	1–1	1–1	0–1	2–2	2–2	1–0	2–1	2–1	0–0	2–2	2–0	1–1
Bradford Park Avenue	1–1	5–1	4–1		4–3	3–1	1–0	1–0	2–1	3–0	2–1	2–0	3–1	3–2	3–0	4–0	0–3	0–2	1–0	2–3
Bristol City	1–1	1–2	1–0	2–0		2–0	3–0	0–1	4–1	1–0	1–0	2–1	1–1	1–0	4–1	1–0	1–1	5–0	0–0	1–1
Bury	4–0	3–1	1–0	0–0	3–1		0–0	1–0	1–0	3–1	2–1	2–0	1–1	1–1	1–0	1–0	3–3	1–0	1–4	1–1
Clapton Orient	1–0	2–2	2–0	1–0	5–2	1–0		1–0	5–1	0–0	0–0	3–0	3–1	1–0	5–1	3–1	1–0	1–1	2–2	1–0
Fulham	1–2	1–0	0–0	1–6	3–1	1–1	2–0		2–1	2–2	1–0	0–1	0–1	1–2	4–0	2–0	1–2	2–0	1–0	6–1
Glossop	5–1	4–1	1–2	2–1	1–1	2–1	0–3	0–1		3–0	2–3	2–1	1–1	0–2	4–0	3–0	0–1	1–1	1–2	0–2
Grimsby Town	1–1	0–2	2–0	0–0	1–0	1–0	2–0	0–3	3–0		2–1	1–3	0–1	3–0	1–3	3–0	0–0	2–0	1–0	1–1
Huddersfield Town	3–1	7–0	1–0	0–1	1–2	1–1	1–0	3–1	2–1	1–2		0–3	1–1	1–2	2–1	1–1	2–1	0–2	0–0	1–2
Hull City	0–1	0–0	0–0	1–3	0–1	0–1	2–0	1–1	3–0	2–1	4–1		1–0	0–0	1–1	1–0	2–0	3–0	7–1	1–2
Leeds City	3–0	3–2	2–1	5–1	1–0	2–1	0–0	2–1	3–0	4–1	5–1	1–2		2–1	1–0	8–0	2–4	5–1	5–0	0–0
Leicester Fosse	0–2	0–0	0–1	2–3	3–0	0–0	1–0	3–0	1–3	2–0	0–1	0–4	5–1		2–0	5–1	0–2	2–5	2–3	1–2
Lincoln City	2–2	1–1	1–2	0–3	2–1	1–0	0–0	0–1	1–5	1–3	3–0	0–0	1–0	3–0		1–0	0–0	0–3	1–0	5–2
Nottingham Forest	0–2	3–1	3–0	1–0	1–1	1–1	1–1	1–1	1–2	4–1	1–1	1–2	2–1	1–3	2–1		1–0	2–2	1–3	0–0
Notts County	3–1	5–1	2–0	2–3	4–0	2–0	3–0	4–0	2–2	4–0	3–0	4–1	4–0	4–1	2–1	2–2		2–1	2–0	1–0
Stockport County	1–1	2–0	0–0	3–1	5–1	3–0	0–1	1–3	1–1	2–2	0–0	2–1	2–1	3–0	2–3	2–1	1–2		0–0	2–0
Wolverhampton Wanderers	0–1	1–0	1–0	1–0	0–2	3–0	2–1	1–0	1–0	4–1	2–2	1–0	1–3	2–1	1–0	4–1	4–1	3–1		1–2
Woolwich Arsenal	1–0	1–0	2–1	2–0	1–1	0–1	2–2	2–0	2–0	2–0	0–1	0–0	1–0	2–1	3–0	3–2	3–0	4–0	3–1	

Updated to match(es) played on unknown. Source: Ian Laschke: Rothmans Book of Football League Records 1888–89 to 1978–79. Macdonald and Jane’s, London & Sydney, 1980.
Legend: Blue = home team win; Yellow = draw; Red = away team win.

=== Maps ===
Locations of the Football League Second Division London teams
Locations of the Football League Second Division teams

== Attendances ==
=== Division One ===
No.	Club	Average
1	Chelsea FC	37,105
2	Tottenham Hotspur FC	28,020
3	Manchester City FC	26,805
4	Manchester United	25,515
5	Aston Villa FC	25,350
6	Everton FC	25,250
7	Bolton Wanderers FC	25,055
8	Newcastle United FC	24,710
9	Liverpool FC	24,315
10	Blackburn Rovers FC	22,295
11	Burnley FC	21,820
12	The Wednesday	21,360
13	Sunderland AFC	20,865
14	West Bromwich Albion FC	20,135
15	Sheffield United FC	19,935
16	Bradford City AFC	17,045
17	Preston North End FC	16,265
18	Middlesbrough FC	14,615
19	Oldham Athletic FC	13,155
20	Derby County FC	9,965

=== Division Two ===
No.	Club	Average
1	Woolwich Arsenal	22,745
2	Birmingham City FC	17,620
3	Bradford Park Avenue AFC	15,995
4	Leeds City FC	15,845
5	Fulham FC	14,360
6	Leyton Orient FC	12,970
7	Notts County FC	11,945
8	Wolverhampton Wanderers FC	10,640
9	Bristol City FC	10,600
10	Hull City AFC	9,560
11	Leicester Fosse	9,365
12	Bury FC	8,440
13	Grimsby Town FC	8,345
14	Nottingham Forest FC	8,090
15	Barnsley FC	7,800
16	Lincoln City FC	7,750
17	Stockport County FC	7,000
18	Huddersfield Town AFC	6,880
19	Blackpool FC	6,145
20	Glossop North End AFC	2,670

== See also ==
- 1913–14 in English football
- 1913 in association football
- 1914 in association football
