= Tom Lloyd =

Tom or Tommy Lloyd may refer to:

- Tom Lloyd (artist) (1929–1996), American artist
- Tom Lloyd (author) (born 1979), British novelist
- Tom Lloyd (bushranger), Australian bushranger
- Tom Lloyd, bass musician of The Del Fuegos
- Tommy Lloyd (born 1974), American basketball coach
- Tommy Lloyd (footballer) (1903–1984), English footballer

== See also ==
- Thomas Lloyd (disambiguation)
