= Callachan =

British surname

Callachan is a British surname that originates from the Irish Ceallachán. It may refer to the following notable people:

- Harry Callachan (1903–1990), Scottish football player
- Ralph Callachan (born 1955), Scottish football player
- Ross Callachan (born 1993), Scottish football player

== See also ==
- Cellachán Caisil
