= 1903–04 in English football =

Football in England
- Season: 1903–04

Men's football
- First Division: The Wednesday
- Second Division: Preston North End
- Southern League: Southampton
- Northern League: Newcastle United A
- The Combination: Birkenhead
- Western League: Tottenham Hotspur
- FA Cup: Manchester City
- Sheriff of London Charity Shield: Sunderland

The 1903–04 season was the 33rd season of competitive football in England.

For the first time ever, a London (and Southern) team, Woolwich Arsenal, were promoted to the First Division and made the league's reach nationwide. They joined champions Preston North End in the top flight, after the Lilywhites beat arch-rivals Blackpool in the final game of the season to clinch the championship. Bradford City replaced Doncaster Rovers.

== Honours ==
Competition	Winner
First Division	The Wednesday (2)
Second Division	Preston North End
FA Cup	Manchester City (1)
Home Championship	England

Notes = Number in parentheses is the times that club has won that honour. * indicates new record for competition

== Football League ==
=== First Division ===
Pos	Team	Pld	W	D	L	GF	GA	GAv	Pts	Relegation
1	The Wednesday (C)	34	20	7	7	48	28	1.714	47	
2	Manchester City	34	19	6	9	71	45	1.578	44	
3	Everton	34	19	5	10	59	32	1.844	43	
4	Newcastle United	34	18	6	10	58	45	1.289	42	
5	Aston Villa	34	17	7	10	70	48	1.458	41	
6	Sunderland	34	17	5	12	63	49	1.286	39	
7	Sheffield United	34	15	8	11	62	57	1.088	38	
8	Wolverhampton Wanderers	34	14	8	12	44	66	0.667	36	
9	Nottingham Forest	34	11	9	14	57	57	1.000	31	
10	Middlesbrough	34	9	12	13	46	47	0.979	30	
11	Small Heath	34	11	8	15	39	52	0.750	30	
12	Bury	34	7	15	12	40	53	0.755	29	
13	Notts County	34	12	5	17	37	61	0.607	29	
14	Derby County	34	9	10	15	58	60	0.967	28	
15	Blackburn Rovers	34	11	6	17	48	60	0.800	28	
16	Stoke	34	10	7	17	54	57	0.947	27	
17	Liverpool (R)	34	9	8	17	49	62	0.790	26	Relegation to the Second Division
18	West Bromwich Albion (R)	34	7	10	17	36	60	0.600	24	Relegation to the Second Division

Source: World Football
Rules for classification: 1) Points; 2) Goal average; 3) Goals scored
(C) Champions; (R) Relegated

=== Second Division ===
Pos	Team	Pld	W	D	L	GF	GA	GAv	Pts	Promotion or relegation
1	Preston North End (C, P)	34	20	10	4	62	24	2.583	50	Promotion to the First Division
2	Woolwich Arsenal (P)	34	21	7	6	91	22	4.136	49	Promotion to the First Division
3	Manchester United	34	20	8	6	65	33	1.970	48	
4	Bristol City	34	18	6	10	73	41	1.780	42	
5	Burnley	34	15	9	10	50	55	0.909	39	
6	Grimsby Town	34	14	8	12	50	49	1.020	36	
7	Bolton Wanderers	34	12	10	12	59	41	1.439	34	
8	Barnsley	34	11	10	13	38	57	0.667	32	
9	Gainsborough Trinity	34	14	3	17	53	60	0.883	31	
10	Bradford City	34	12	7	15	45	59	0.763	31	
11	Chesterfield Town	34	11	8	15	37	45	0.822	30	
12	Lincoln City	34	11	8	15	41	58	0.707	30	
13	Burslem Port Vale	34	10	9	15	54	52	1.038	29	
14	Burton United	34	11	7	16	45	61	0.738	29	
15	Blackpool	34	11	5	18	40	67	0.597	27	
16	Stockport County (R)	34	8	11	15	40	72	0.556	27	Failed re-election and demoted
17	Glossop	34	10	6	18	57	64	0.891	26	Re-elected
18	Leicester Fosse	34	6	10	18	42	82	0.512	22	Re-elected

(C) Champions; (P) Promoted; (R) Relegated
