= 2000–01 FA Premier League =

English football season

FA Premier League
- Season: 2000–01
- Dates: 19 August 2000 – 19 May 2001
- Champions: Manchester United; 7th Premier League title 14th English title
- Relegated: Manchester City; Coventry City; Bradford City
- Champions League: Manchester United; Arsenal; Liverpool
- UEFA Cup: Leeds United; Ipswich Town; Chelsea
- Intertoto Cup: Aston Villa; Newcastle United
- Matches: 380
- Goals: 992 (2.61 per match)
- Top goalscorer: Jimmy Floyd Hasselbaink (23 goals)
- Best goalkeeper: Fabien Barthez; Paul Jones; Sander Westerveld (14 clean sheets each)
- Biggest home win: Manchester United 6–0 Bradford City (5 September 2000)
- Biggest away win: Derby County 0–4 Liverpool (15 October 2000); Manchester City 0–4 Leeds United (13 January 2001); Derby County 0–4 Chelsea (7 April 2001); Manchester City 0–4 Arsenal (11 April 2001); Charlton Athletic 0–4 Liverpool (19 May 2001)
- Highest scoring: Arsenal 5–3 Charlton Athletic (26 August 2000)
- Longest winning run: 8 games Manchester United
- Longest unbeaten run: 13 games Leeds United
- Longest winless run: 13 games Bradford City; Derby County
- Longest losing run: 8 games Leicester City
- Highest attendance: 67,637; Manchester United 4–2 Coventry City (14 April 2001)
- Lowest attendance: 15,523; Bradford City 2–1 Coventry City (2 December 2000)
- Total attendance: 12,503,039
- Average attendance: 32,903

The 2000–01 FA Premier League (known as the FA Carling Premiership for sponsorship reasons) was the ninth FA Premier League season and the third season running which ended with Manchester United as champions and Arsenal as runners-up. Sir Alex Ferguson became the first manager to win three successive English league titles with the same club. Liverpool, meanwhile, managed a unique cup treble – winning the FA Cup, League Cup and UEFA Cup. They also finished third in the Premier League and qualified for the Champions League. Nike replaced Mitre as manufacturer of the official Premier League match ball, a contract that has since been extended multiple times, with the most recent renewal made in November 2018 to the end of the 2024–25 season.

UEFA Cup places went to Leeds United, Chelsea, Ipswich Town, and Aston Villa, who qualified via the Intertoto Cup. None of the top six clubs in the Premier League had an English manager. The most successful English manager in the 2000–01 Premier League campaign was Peter Reid, whose Sunderland side finished seventh, having spent most of the season challenging for a place in Europe, and briefly occupied second place in the Premier League table.

Despite the success achieved by Sir Alex Ferguson and Gérard Houllier, the Manager of the Year Award went to George Burley. The Ipswich Town manager was in charge of a newly promoted side who began the season as relegation favourites and on a limited budget, guided his team to fifth place in the Premier League final table earning a total of 66 points - the highest total in Premier League history for a newly promoted side since the switch to a 20-team format—and a place in the UEFA Cup for the first time in almost 20 years. 2000–01 was perhaps the best season yet for newly promoted teams in the Premier League. Charlton Athletic finished ninth, their highest finish since the 1950s. The only newly promoted team to suffer relegation was Manchester City, who in the space of six seasons had now been relegated three times and promoted twice. Bradford City went down bottom after just two seasons in the Premier League, and are yet to return. The next relegation place went to Coventry City, who were finally relegated after 34 successive seasons of top division football, which had brought numerous relegation battles and league finishes no higher than sixth place. This began a 25 year spell in the lower leagues of English football for the Sky Blues, ended by their Championship title win in 2026.

== Teams ==
Twenty teams competed in the league – the top seventeen teams from the previous season and the three teams promoted from the First Division. The promoted teams were Charlton Athletic, Manchester City and Ipswich Town, returning after a top flight absence of one, four and five years respectively. They replaced Wimbledon, Sheffield Wednesday and Watford. They were relegated to the First Division after spending fourteen, nine and one year in the top flight respectively.

=== Stadiums and locations ===
Locations of the 2000–01 Premier League teams
Greater London Premier League football clubs

Team	Location	Stadium	Capacity
Arsenal	London (Highbury)	Arsenal Stadium	38,419
Aston Villa	Birmingham	Villa Park	42,573
Bradford City	Bradford	Valley Parade	25,136
Charlton Athletic	London (Charlton)	The Valley	20,043
Chelsea	London (Fulham)	Stamford Bridge	42,055
Coventry City	Coventry	Highfield Road	23,489
Derby County	Derby	Pride Park Stadium	33,597
Everton	Liverpool (Walton)	Goodison Park	40,569
Ipswich Town	Ipswich	Portman Road	30,300
Leeds United	Leeds	Elland Road	40,242
Leicester City	Leicester	Filbert Street	22,000
Liverpool	Liverpool (Anfield)	Anfield	45,522
Manchester City	Manchester (Moss Side)	Maine Road	35,150
Manchester United	Manchester (Old Trafford)	Old Trafford	68,174
Middlesbrough	Middlesbrough	Riverside Stadium	35,049
Newcastle United	Newcastle upon Tyne	St James' Park	52,387
Southampton	Southampton	The Dell (Note: This was Southampton's last season at The Dell as they were scheduled to relocate to St Mary's Stadium from the following season onward.)	15,200
Sunderland	Sunderland	Stadium of Light	49,000
Tottenham Hotspur	London (Tottenham)	White Hart Lane	36,240
West Ham United	London (Upton Park)	Boleyn Ground	35,647

=== Personnel and kits ===
(as of 14 May 2001)

Team	Manager	Captain	Kit manufacturer	Shirt sponsor
Arsenal	(France) Arsène Wenger	(England) Tony Adams	Nike	Dreamcast/Sega^{1}
Aston Villa	(England) John Gregory	(England) Gareth Southgate	Diadora	NTL
Bradford City	(Scotland) Jim Jefferies	(Scotland) Stuart McCall	Asics	JCT600 Ltd
Charlton Athletic	(England) Alan Curbishley	(Republic of Ireland) Mark Kinsella	Le Coq Sportif	Redbus
Chelsea	(Italy) Claudio Ranieri	(England) Dennis Wise	Umbro	Autoglass
Coventry City	(Scotland) Gordon Strachan	(Morocco) Mustapha Hadji	CCFC Garments	Subaru
Derby County	(England) Jim Smith	(Jamaica) Darryl Powell	Puma	EDS
Everton	(Scotland) Walter Smith	(England) Dave Watson	Puma	One2One
Ipswich Town	(Scotland) George Burley	(Republic of Ireland) Matt Holland	Punch	Greene King
Leeds United	(Republic of Ireland) David O'Leary	(South Africa) Lucas Radebe	Nike	Strongbow
Leicester City	(England) Peter Taylor	(Scotland) Matt Elliott	Le Coq Sportif	Walkers Crisps
Liverpool	(France) Gérard Houllier	(England) Jamie Redknapp	Reebok	Carlsberg Group
Manchester City	(England) Joe Royle	(Norway) Alf-Inge Haaland	Le Coq Sportif	Eidos
Manchester United	(Scotland) Sir Alex Ferguson	(Republic of Ireland) Roy Keane	Umbro	Vodafone
Middlesbrough	(England) Terry Venables (England) Bryan Robson	(England) Paul Ince	Erreà	BT Cellnet
Newcastle United	(England) Bobby Robson	(England) Alan Shearer	Adidas	NTL
Southampton	(England) Stuart Gray	(England) Matt Le Tissier	Saints	Friends Provident
Sunderland	(England) Peter Reid	(England) Michael Gray	Nike	Reg Vardy
Tottenham Hotspur	(England) Glenn Hoddle	(England) Sol Campbell	Adidas	Holsten
West Ham United	(England) Glenn Roeder	(Northern Ireland) Steve Lomas	Fila	Dr. Martens

- ^{1} The Dreamcast logo appeared on Arsenal's home and third shirts while the Sega logo appeared on their away shirt.

=== Managerial changes ===
Team	Outgoing manager	Manner of departure	Date of vacancy	Position in table	Incoming manager	Date of appointment
Leicester City	(Northern Ireland) Martin O'Neill	Signed by Celtic	1 June 2000	Pre-season	(England) Peter Taylor	12 June 2000
Bradford City	(England) Paul Jewell	Signed by Sheffield Wednesday	18 June 2000	Pre-season	(England) Chris Hutchings	18 June 2000
Chelsea	(Italy) Gianluca Vialli	Sacked	12 September 2000	10th	(Italy) Claudio Ranieri	17 September 2000
Bradford City	(England) Chris Hutchings	Sacked	6 November 2000	19th	(Scotland) Stuart McCall (caretaker)	6 November 2000
Bradford City	(Scotland) Stuart McCall (caretaker)	End of caretaker spell	20 November 2000	20th	(Scotland) Jim Jefferies	20 November 2000
Tottenham Hotspur	(Scotland) George Graham	Sacked	16 March 2001	13th	(England) Glenn Hoddle	30 March 2001
Southampton	(England) Glenn Hoddle	Signed by Tottenham Hotspur	30 March 2001	9th	(England) Stuart Gray	30 March 2001
West Ham United	(England) Harry Redknapp	Mutual consent	9 May 2001	14th	(England) Glenn Roeder (caretaker)	12 May 2001

== League table ==
Pos	Team	Pld	W	D	L	GF	GA	GD	Pts	Qualification or relegation
1	Manchester United (C)	38	24	8	6	79	31	+48	80	Qualification for the Champions League first group stage
2	Arsenal	38	20	10	8	63	38	+25	70	Qualification for the Champions League first group stage
3	Liverpool	38	20	9	9	71	39	+32	69	Qualification for the Champions League third qualifying round (Note: Since Liverpool won the League Cup and qualified for the Champions League, their UEFA Cup place went to fifth-placed Ipswich Town. Since both FA Cup finalists, Liverpool and Arsenal, qualified for the Champions League, the berth in the UEFA Cup went to sixth-placed Chelsea. Both Ipswich and Chelsea were the highest-ranked team not already qualified for a European competition.)
4	Leeds United	38	20	8	10	64	43	+21	68	Qualification for the UEFA Cup first round
5	Ipswich Town	38	20	6	12	57	42	+15	66	Qualification for the UEFA Cup first round
6	Chelsea	38	17	10	11	68	45	+23	61	Qualification for the UEFA Cup first round
7	Sunderland	38	15	12	11	46	41	+5	57	
8	Aston Villa	38	13	15	10	46	43	+3	54	Qualification for the Intertoto Cup third round
9	Charlton Athletic	38	14	10	14	50	57	−7	52	
10	Southampton	38	14	10	14	40	48	−8	52	
11	Newcastle United	38	14	9	15	44	50	−6	51	Qualification for the Intertoto Cup third round
12	Tottenham Hotspur	38	13	10	15	47	54	−7	49	
13	Leicester City	38	14	6	18	39	51	−12	48	
14	Middlesbrough	38	9	15	14	44	44	0	42	
15	West Ham United	38	10	12	16	45	50	−5	42	
16	Everton	38	11	9	18	45	59	−14	42	
17	Derby County	38	10	12	16	37	59	−22	42	
18	Manchester City (R)	38	8	10	20	41	65	−24	34	Relegation to the Football League First Division
19	Coventry City (R)	38	8	10	20	36	63	−27	34	Relegation to the Football League First Division
20	Bradford City (R)	38	5	11	22	30	70	−40	26	Relegation to the Football League First Division

Source: Premier League
Rules for classification: 1) points; 2) goal difference; 3) number of goals scored.
(C) Champions; (R) Relegated

== Results ==
Home \ Away	ARS	AVL	BRA	CHA	CHE	COV	DER	EVE	IPS	LEE	LEI	LIV	MCI	MUN	MID	NEW	SOU	SUN	TOT	WHU
Arsenal		1–0	2–0	5–3	1–1	2–1	0–0	4–1	1–0	2–1	6–1	2–0	5–0	1–0	0–3	5–0	1–0	2–2	2–0	3–0
Aston Villa	0–0		2–0	2–1	1–1	3–2	4–1	2–1	2–1	1–2	2–1	0–3	2–2	0–1	1–1	1–1	0–0	0–0	2–0	2–2
Bradford City	1–1	0–3		2–0	2–0	2–1	2–0	0–1	0–2	1–1	0–0	0–2	2–2	0–3	1–1	2–2	0–1	1–4	3–3	1–2
Charlton Athletic	1–0	3–3	2–0		2–0	2–2	2–1	1–0	2–1	1–2	2–0	0–4	4–0	3–3	1–0	2–0	1–1	0–1	1–0	1–1
Chelsea	2–2	1–0	3–0	0–1		6–1	4–1	2–1	4–1	1–1	0–2	3–0	2–1	1–1	2–1	3–1	1–0	2–4	3–0	4–2
Coventry City	0–1	1–1	0–0	2–2	0–0		2–0	1–3	0–1	0–0	1–0	0–2	1–1	1–2	1–3	0–2	1–1	1–0	2–1	0–3
Derby County	1–2	1–0	2–0	2–2	0–4	1–0		1–0	1–1	1–1	2–0	0–4	1–1	0–3	3–3	2–0	2–2	1–0	2–1	0–0
Everton	2–0	0–1	2–1	3–0	2–1	1–2	2–2		0–3	2–2	2–1	2–3	3–1	1–3	2–2	1–1	1–1	2–2	0–0	1–1
Ipswich Town	1–1	1–2	3–1	2–0	2–2	2–0	0–1	2–0		1–2	2–0	1–1	2–1	1–1	2–1	1–0	3–1	1–0	3–0	1–1
Leeds United	1–0	1–2	6–1	3–1	2–0	1–0	0–0	2–0	1–2		3–1	4–3	1–2	1–1	1–1	1–3	2–0	2–0	4–3	0–1
Leicester City	0–0	0–0	1–2	3–1	2–1	1–3	2–1	1–1	2–1	3–1		2–0	1–2	0–3	0–3	1–1	1–0	2–0	4–2	2–1
Liverpool	4–0	3–1	1–0	3–0	2–2	4–1	1–1	3–1	0–1	1–2	1–0		3–2	2–0	0–0	3–0	2–1	1–1	3–1	3–0
Manchester City	0–4	1–3	2–0	1–4	1–2	1–2	0–0	5–0	2–3	0–4	0–1	1–1		0–1	1–1	0–1	0–1	4–2	0–1	1–0
Manchester United	6–1	2–0	6–0	2–1	3–3	4–2	0–1	1–0	2–0	3–0	2–0	0–1	1–1		2–1	2–0	5–0	3–0	2–0	3–1
Middlesbrough	0–1	1–1	2–2	0–0	1–0	1–1	4–0	1–2	1–2	1–2	0–3	1–0	1–1	0–2		1–3	0–1	0–0	1–1	2–1
Newcastle United	0–0	3–0	2–1	0–1	0–0	3–1	3–2	0–1	2–1	2–1	1–0	2–1	0–1	1–1	1–2		1–1	1–2	2–0	2–1
Southampton	3–2	2–0	2–0	0–0	3–2	1–2	1–0	1–0	0–3	1–0	1–0	3–3	0–2	2–1	1–3	2–0		0–1	2–0	2–3
Sunderland	1–0	1–1	0–0	3–2	1–0	1–0	2–1	2–0	4–1	0–2	0–0	1–1	1–0	0–1	1–0	1–1	2–2		2–3	1–1
Tottenham Hotspur	1–1	0–0	2–1	0–0	0–3	3–0	3–1	3–2	3–1	1–2	3–0	2–1	0–0	3–1	0–0	4–2	0–0	2–1		1–0
West Ham United	1–2	1–1	1–1	5–0	0–2	1–1	3–1	0–2	0–1	0–2	0–1	1–1	4–1	2–2	1–0	1–0	3–0	0–2	0–0	

Source: Premier League
Legend: Blue = home team win; Yellow = draw; Red = away team win.

== Season statistics ==
=== Scoring ===
==== Top scorers ====
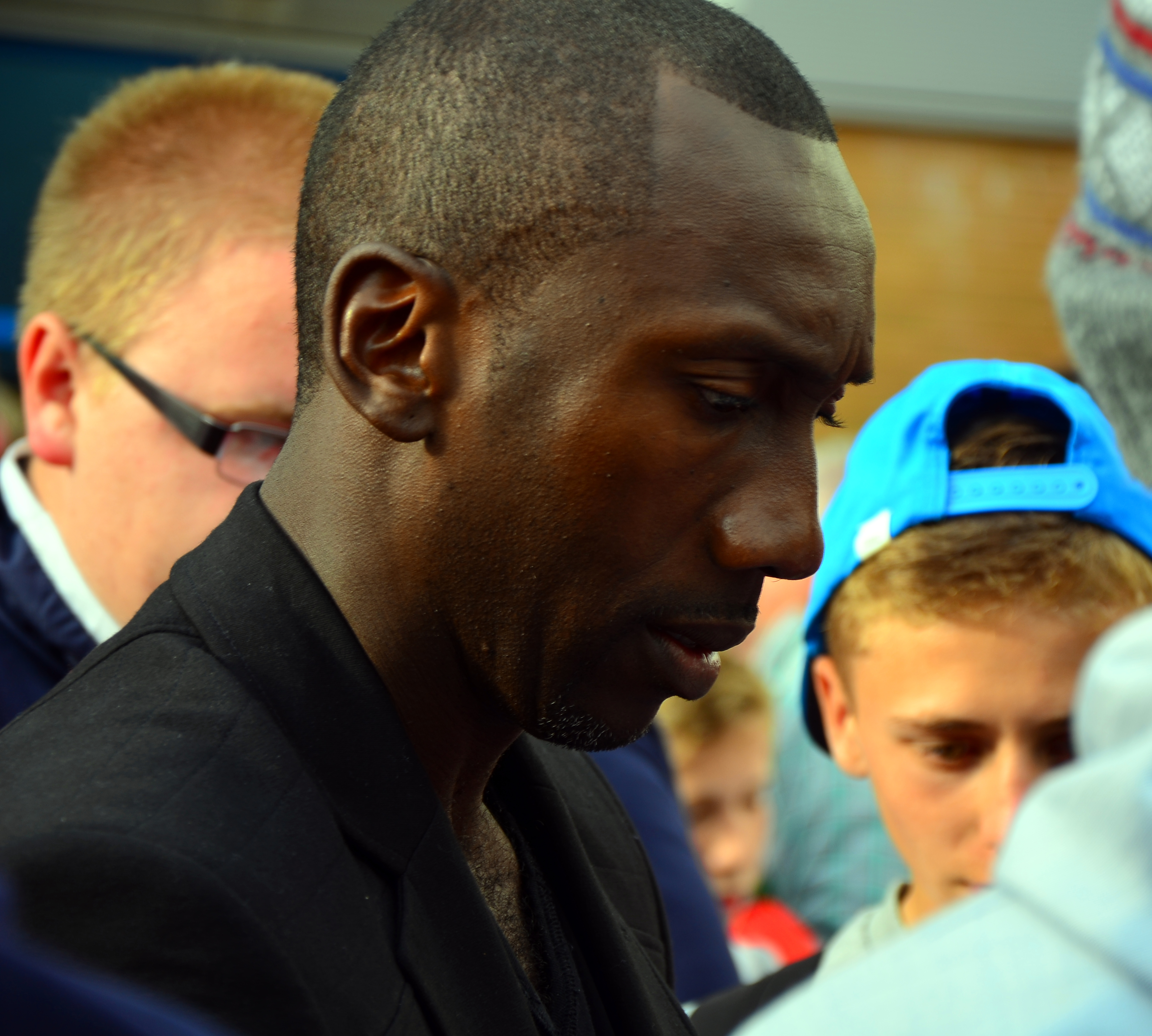
Chelsea's Jimmy Floyd Hasselbaink was the top scorer for the second time, with 23 goals.

Rank	Player	Club	Goals
1	(Netherlands) Jimmy Floyd Hasselbaink	Chelsea	23
2	(England) Marcus Stewart	Ipswich Town	19
3	(France) Thierry Henry	Arsenal	17
3	(Australia) Mark Viduka	Leeds United	17
5	(England) Michael Owen	Liverpool	16
6	(England) Teddy Sheringham	Manchester United	15
7	(England) Emile Heskey	Liverpool	14
7	(England) Kevin Phillips	Sunderland	14
9	(Croatia) Alen Bokšić	Middlesbrough	12
10	(Finland) Jonatan Johansson	Charlton Athletic	11

==== Hat-tricks ====
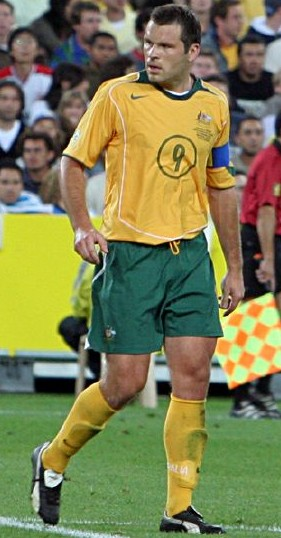
The 2000–01 Premier League season would see Leeds United's Mark Viduka become the first (and, so far only) Australian to score a hat-trick.

Player	For	Against	Result	Date	Ref
(Costa Rica) Paulo Wanchope	Manchester City	Sunderland	4–2 (H)	23 August 2000	
(England) Michael Owen	Liverpool	Aston Villa	3–1 (H)	6 September 2000	
(England) Emile Heskey^{P}	Liverpool	Derby County	4–0 (A)	15 October 2000	
(Netherlands) Jimmy Floyd Hasselbaink^{4}	Chelsea	Coventry City	6–1 (H)	21 October 2000	
(England) Teddy Sheringham	Manchester United	Southampton	5–0 (H)	28 October 2000	
(Australia) Mark Viduka^{4}	Leeds United	Liverpool	4–3 (H)	4 November 2000	
(England) Les Ferdinand^{P}	Tottenham Hotspur	Leicester City	3–0 (H)	25 November 2000	
(England) Ray Parlour	Arsenal	Newcastle United	5–0 (H)	9 December 2000	
(France) Thierry Henry	Arsenal	Leicester City	6–1 (H)	26 December 2000	
(England) Kevin Phillips	Sunderland	Bradford City	4–1 (A)	26 December 2000	
(Trinidad and Tobago) Dwight Yorke	Manchester United	Arsenal	6–1 (H)	25 February 2001	
(France) Sylvain Wiltord	Arsenal	West Ham United	3–0 (H)	3 March 2001	
(England) Marcus Stewart	Ipswich Town	Southampton	3–0 (A)	2 April 2001	
(England) Michael Owen	Liverpool	Newcastle United	3–0 (H)	5 May 2001	

Note: ^{4} Player scored 4 goals; ^{P} Player scored a perfect hat-trick; (H) – Home; (A) – Away

==== Top assists ====
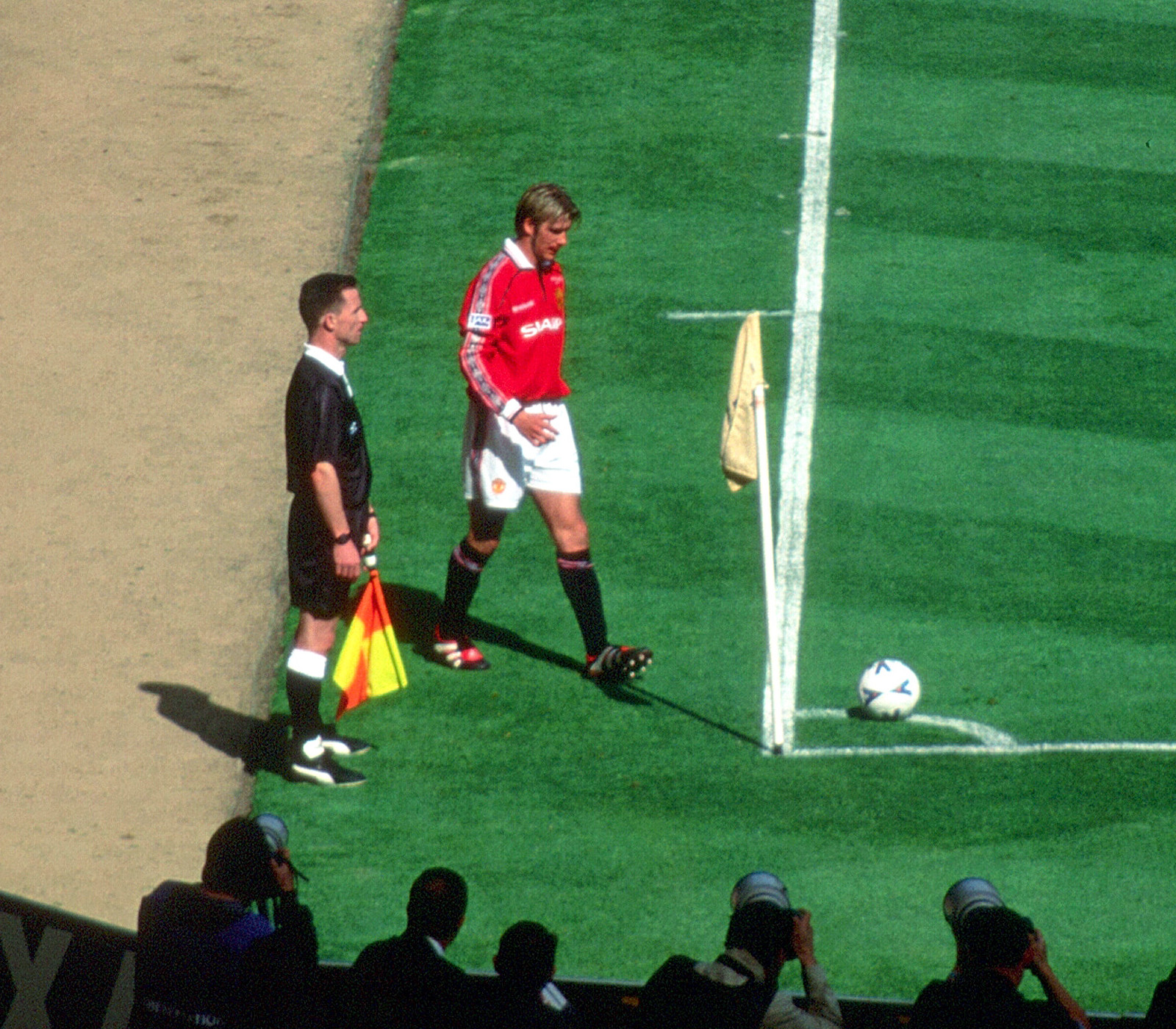
Manchester United's David Beckham was the top assist provider with 12 assists for the club in the 2000–01 Premier League season.

Rank	Player	Club	Assists
1	(England) David Beckham	Manchester United	12
2	(Peru) Nolberto Solano	Newcastle United	10
3	(Netherlands) Jimmy Floyd Hasselbaink	Chelsea	9
3	(France) Thierry Henry	Arsenal	9
3	(Czech Republic) Vladimír Šmicer	Liverpool	9
6	(Wales) Ryan Giggs	Manchester United	8
6	(England) Graham Stuart	Charlton Athletic	8
8	(England) Stephen Clemence	Tottenham Hotspur	7
8	(Italy) Paolo Di Canio	West Ham United	7
8	(Morocco) Hassan Kachloul	Southampton	7

== Awards ==
=== Monthly awards ===
Month	Manager of the Month		Player of the Month	
Month	Manager	Club	Player	Club
August	(England) Bobby Robson	Newcastle United	(England) Alan Smith	Leeds United
September	(England) Peter Taylor	Leicester City	(England) Tim Flowers	Leicester City
October	(France) Arsène Wenger	Arsenal	(England) Teddy Sheringham	Manchester United
November	(Scotland) George Burley	Ipswich Town	(England) Paul Robinson	Leeds United
December	(England) Peter Reid	Sunderland	(England) James Beattie	Southampton
January	(England) Terry Venables	Middlesbrough	(Republic of Ireland) Robbie Keane	Leeds United
February	(Scotland) Alex Ferguson	Manchester United	(England) Stuart Pearce	West Ham United
March	(Republic of Ireland) David O'Leary	Leeds United	(England) Steven Gerrard	Liverpool
April	(Republic of Ireland) David O'Leary	Leeds United	(Scotland) Gary McAllister	Liverpool

=== Annual awards ===
Award	Winner	Club
Premier League Manager of the Season	(Scotland) George Burley	Ipswich Town
Premier League Player of the Season	(France) Patrick Vieira	Arsenal
PFA Players' Player of the Year	(England) Teddy Sheringham	Manchester United
PFA Young Player of the Year	(England) Steven Gerrard	Liverpool
FWA Footballer of the Year	(England) Teddy Sheringham	Manchester United

PFA Team of the Year
Goalkeeper	(France) Fabien Barthez (Manchester United)			
Defence	(Republic of Ireland) Stephen Carr (Tottenham Hotspur)	(Netherlands) Jaap Stam (Manchester United)	(England) Wes Brown (Manchester United)	(Brazil) Sylvinho (Arsenal)
Midfield	(England) Steven Gerrard (Liverpool)	(Republic of Ireland) Roy Keane (Manchester United)	(France) Patrick Vieira (Arsenal)	(Wales) Ryan Giggs (Manchester United)
Attack	(England) Teddy Sheringham (Manchester United)		(France) Thierry Henry (Arsenal)	

== Attendances ==
#	Football club	Home games	Average attendance
1	Manchester United	19	67,490
2	Newcastle United	19	51,309
3	Sunderland AFC	19	46,791
4	Liverpool FC	19	43,699
5	Leeds United	19	38,974
6	Arsenal FC	19	37,974
7	Tottenham Hotspur	19	35,195
8	Chelsea FC	19	34,700
9	Everton FC	19	34,131
10	Manchester City	19	34,058
11	Aston Villa	19	31,597
12	Middlesbrough FC	19	30,747
13	Derby County	19	28,551
14	West Ham United	19	25,697
15	Ipswich Town	19	22,532
16	Coventry City	19	20,582
17	Leicester City	19	20,452
18	Charlton Athletic	19	20,023
19	Bradford City	19	18,511
20	Southampton FC	19	15,115
