= 1904–05 Football League =

17th season of the Football League

The Football League
- Season: 1904–05
- Champions: Newcastle United
- Relegated: Doncaster Rovers
- New Club in League: Doncaster Rovers

The 1904–05 season was the 17th season of The Football League. Woolwich Arsenal were the first club from southern England to feature in the top flight of English football since its inception in 1888–89.

== Final league tables ==
Beginning in the 1894–95 season, clubs finishing level on points were separated according to goal average (goals scored divided by goals conceded). In case one or more teams had the same goal difference, this system favoured those teams who had scored fewer goals. The goal average system was eventually scrapped beginning with the 1976–77 season.

During the first six seasons of the league, (up to the 1893–94 season), re-election process concerned the clubs which finished in the bottom four of the league. From the 1894–95 season and until the 1920–21 season the re-election process was required of the clubs which finished in the bottom three of the league.

== First Division ==
First Division
- Season: 1904–05
- Champions: Newcastle United; 1st English title
- Matches: 306
- Goals: 904 (2.95 per match)
- Top goalscorer: Arthur Brown (22 goals)
- Biggest home win: Bury 7–1 Sheffield United (12 November 1904); Manchester City 6–0 Derby County (17 December 1904)
- Biggest away win: Notts County 1–5 Woolwich Arsenal (17 December 1904); Notts County 1–5 Sheffield United (28 January 1905)
- Highest scoring: The Wednesday 5–5 Everton (12 November 1904)
- Longest winning run: 8 matches Manchester City
- Longest unbeaten run: 10 matches Everton
- Longest losing run: 5 matches Bury; Derby County; Notts County; Stoke
- Highest attendance: 50,000; Aston Villa 2–1 Small Heath (29 October 1904)
- Lowest attendance: 2,000; The Wednesday 1–1 Derby County (3 April 1905); Stoke 1–0 Small Heath (29 April 1905)
- Average attendance: 13,404

Pos	Team	Pld	W	D	L	GF	GA	GAv	Pts
1	Newcastle United (C)	34	23	2	9	72	33	2.182	48
2	Everton	34	21	5	8	63	36	1.750	47
3	Manchester City	34	20	6	8	66	37	1.784	46
4	Aston Villa	34	19	4	11	63	43	1.465	42
5	Sunderland	34	16	8	10	60	44	1.364	40
6	Sheffield United	34	19	2	13	64	56	1.143	40
7	Small Heath	34	17	5	12	54	38	1.421	39
8	Preston North End	34	13	10	11	42	37	1.135	36
9	The Wednesday	34	14	5	15	61	57	1.070	33
10	Woolwich Arsenal	34	12	9	13	36	40	0.900	33
11	Derby County	34	12	8	14	37	48	0.771	32
12	Stoke	34	13	4	17	40	58	0.690	30
13	Blackburn Rovers	34	11	5	18	40	51	0.784	27
14	Wolverhampton Wanderers	34	11	4	19	47	73	0.644	26
15	Middlesbrough	34	9	8	17	36	56	0.643	26
16	Nottingham Forest	34	9	7	18	40	61	0.656	25
17	Bury	34	10	4	20	47	67	0.701	24
18	Notts County	34	5	8	21	36	69	0.522	18

Source: World Football
Rules for classification: 1) Points; 2) Goal average; 3) Goals scored
(C) Champions

=== Results ===
Home \ Away	AST	BLB	BRY	DER	EVE	MCI	MID	NEW	NOT	NTC	PNE	SHU	SMH	STK	SUN	WED	WOL	WOO
Aston Villa		3–0	2–0	0–2	1–0	3–2	0–0	0–1	2–0	4–2	1–2	3–0	2–1	3–0	2–2	0–2	3–0	3–1
Blackburn Rovers	4–0		0–2	3–1	1–0	3–1	0–2	2–0	0–0	1–0	1–1	2–4	1–4	4–0	2–1	0–1	3–0	1–1
Bury	2–3	0–2		2–0	1–2	2–4	1–0	2–4	5–1	2–0	0–1	7–1	1–1	3–1	1–0	1–4	3–1	1–1
Derby County	0–2	1–1	3–2		1–2	0–1	4–2	1–1	3–2	1–1	3–1	2–3	3–0	3–0	1–0	1–0	2–1	0–0
Everton	3–2	1–0	2–0	0–0		0–0	1–0	2–1	5–1	5–1	1–0	2–0	2–1	4–1	0–1	5–2	2–1	1–0
Manchester City	2–1	2–1	3–2	6–0	2–0		3–2	3–2	1–1	2–1	6–1	1–1	2–1	1–0	5–2	1–1	5–1	1–0
Middlesbrough	3–1	2–1	2–2	2–0	1–0	0–1		0–3	0–0	2–5	1–1	0–1	0–1	2–1	1–3	1–3	3–1	1–0
Newcastle United	2–0	1–0	3–1	2–0	3–2	2–0	3–0		5–1	1–0	1–0	1–1	0–1	4–1	1–3	6–2	3–0	3–0
Nottingham Forest	1–1	5–2	5–1	0–1	0–2	2–1	1–1	1–3		2–1	0–1	1–2	0–2	0–1	2–3	2–1	2–2	0–3
Notts County	1–2	2–1	0–1	0–0	1–2	1–1	0–0	0–3	1–2		1–3	1–5	0–0	0–0	2–2	2–2	3–4	1–5
Preston North End	2–3	0–0	0–0	2–0	1–1	0–1	2–0	1–0	0–1	3–1		4–0	2–2	2–1	3–1	1–0	2–2	3–0
Sheffield United	0–3	3–1	4–0	3–1	1–0	0–3	0–1	1–3	4–0	2–1	1–0		2–1	5–2	1–0	4–2	4–2	4–0
Small Heath	0–3	2–0	5–0	2–0	1–2	3–1	2–1	2–1	1–2	1–2	2–0	2–0		0–1	1–1	2–1	4–1	2–1
Stoke	1–4	4–0	2–0	1–2	2–2	1–0	3–1	1–0	0–0	0–2	1–1	2–1	1–0		1–3	2–1	2–1	2–0
Sunderland	2–3	2–1	2–1	3–0	2–3	0–0	1–1	3–1	1–0	5–0	3–2	2–1	1–4	3–1		3–0	3–0	1–1
The Wednesday	3–2	1–2	4–0	1–1	5–5	2–1	5–0	1–3	2–0	1–0	2–0	1–3	3–1	3–0	1–1		4–0	0–3
Wolverhampton Wanderers	1–1	2–0	2–0	2–0	0–3	0–3	5–3	1–3	3–2	3–1	0–0	4–2	0–1	1–3	1–0	1–0		4–1
Woolwich Arsenal	1–0	2–0	2–1	0–0	2–1	1–0	1–1	0–2	0–3	1–2	0–0	1–0	1–1	2–1	0–0	3–0	2–0	

Updated to match(es) played on unknown. Source:
Legend: Blue = home team win; Yellow = draw; Red = away team win.

=== Maps ===
Locations of the Football League First Division teams

== Second Division ==
Football League Second Division
- Season: 1904–05
- Champions: Liverpool (3rd title)
- Failed re-election: Doncaster Rovers
- Matches: 306
- Goals: 903 (2.95 per match)
- Top goalscorer: Samuel Marsh (Bolton Wanderers), 27
- Biggest home win: Liverpool – Burslem Port Vale 8–1 (8 Apr 1905); Barnsley – Burton United 7–0 (28 Jan 1905); Manchester United – Bradford City 7–0 (2 Jan 1905)
- Biggest away win: Burton United – West Bromwich Albion 0–6 (21 Apr 1905)
- Highest scoring: Liverpool – Burslem Port Vale 8–1 (8 Apr 1905)
- Longest winning run: 14 matches Manchester United (15 Oct 1904 – 3 Jan 1905)
- Longest unbeaten run: 18 matches Manchester United (24 Sep 1904 – 21 Jan 1905)
- Longest losing run: 9 matches Doncaster Rovers (14 Jan 1905 – 1 Apr 1905)

Pos	Team	Pld	W	D	L	GF	GA	GAv	Pts	Promotion or relegation
1	Liverpool (C, P)	34	27	4	3	93	25	3.720	58	Promotion to the First Division
2	Bolton Wanderers (P)	34	27	2	5	87	32	2.719	56	Promotion to the First Division
3	Manchester United	34	24	5	5	81	30	2.700	53	
4	Bristol City	34	19	4	11	66	45	1.467	42	
5	Chesterfield Town	34	14	11	9	44	35	1.257	39	
6	Gainsborough Trinity	34	14	8	12	61	58	1.052	36	
7	Barnsley	34	14	5	15	38	56	0.679	33	
8	Bradford City	34	12	8	14	45	49	0.918	32	
9	Lincoln City	34	12	7	15	42	40	1.050	31	
10	West Bromwich Albion	34	13	4	17	56	48	1.167	30	
11	Burnley	34	12	6	16	43	52	0.827	30	
12	Glossop	34	10	10	14	37	46	0.804	30	
13	Grimsby Town	34	11	8	15	33	46	0.717	30	
14	Leicester Fosse	34	11	7	16	40	55	0.727	29	
15	Blackpool	34	9	10	15	36	48	0.750	28	
16	Burslem Port Vale	34	10	7	17	47	72	0.653	27	Re-elected
17	Burton United	34	8	4	22	30	84	0.357	20	Re-elected
18	Doncaster Rovers (R)	34	3	2	29	23	81	0.284	8	Failed re-election and demoted

(C) Champions; (P) Promoted; (R) Relegated

=== Results ===
Home \ Away	BAR	BLP	BOL	BRA	BRI	BRN	BPV	BRT	CHF	DON	GAI	GLP	GRI	LEI	LIN	LIV	MUN	WBA
Barnsley		2–1	2–1	1–0	1–0	1–2	3–0	7–0	1–0	2–1	2–1	0–0	2–2	2–1	2–1	0–2	0–0	1–1
Blackpool	6–0		0–2	2–0	2–4	2–0	3–0	1–0	1–1	1–0	2–2	4–1	1–1	0–0	1–0	0–3	0–1	0–0
Bolton Wanderers	2–1	3–0		2–0	3–1	4–0	3–1	7–1	4–3	2–0	5–1	4–0	4–1	0–1	4–1	2–0	2–4	2–1
Bradford City	1–2	3–1	2–1		2–3	4–1	2–1	3–1	0–1	4–1	3–1	1–1	0–0	0–0	0–0	2–4	1–1	3–1
Bristol City	3–0	2–0	3–4	1–0		0–0	4–2	5–0	2–1	4–1	1–1	2–0	5–0	3–0	2–0	0–1	1–1	2–1
Burnley	3–0	0–1	0–1	2–1	2–3		5–0	1–1	2–0	4–3	1–3	3–1	1–0	2–0	2–1	0–2	2–0	1–4
Burslem Port Vale	0–2	2–2	1–2	1–1	3–2	3–1		4–2	0–0	2–0	3–2	0–1	2–0	1–3	0–1	1–2	2–2	3–2
Burton United	1–2	0–0	0–1	1–0	2–0	3–1	2–3		0–3	1–0	1–3	2–2	1–0	0–3	2–1	2–1	2–3	0–6
Chesterfield	2–0	2–0	1–0	0–0	0–3	1–1	2–1	6–0		4–1	3–2	1–2	0–0	0–0	0–0	1–1	2–0	1–0
Doncaster Rovers	2–0	0–0	0–4	0–1	0–2	0–2	2–2	1–3	0–2		1–5	2–1	0–2	3–0	0–2	1–4	0–1	0–1
Gainsborough Trinity	4–0	1–1	0–4	3–2	4–1	3–1	1–0	2–0	1–1	2–0		0–0	2–1	2–0	2–0	1–2	0–0	4–2
Glossop	5–0	0–0	1–2	3–1	0–1	0–0	0–0	1–1	0–1	2–0	3–1		2–0	0–0	3–2	0–2	1–2	2–1
Grimsby Town	0–0	2–0	2–2	0–2	4–0	1–0	0–3	1–0	3–1	2–1	0–0	3–0		2–0	1–0	0–1	0–1	1–3
Leicester Fosse	2–0	3–1	2–4	1–2	2–1	2–2	3–0	2–0	1–1	3–2	1–1	0–2	5–1		0–1	0–3	0–3	3–1
Lincoln City	2–0	1–0	0–2	1–1	1–3	2–0	3–3	3–1	0–0	3–0	4–1	3–0	0–0	5–1		0–2	3–0	0–2
Liverpool	2–1	5–0	1–1	4–1	3–1	3–0	8–1	2–0	6–1	1–0	6–1	2–2	5–0	4–0	1–1		4–0	3–2
Manchester United	4–0	3–1	1–2	7–0	4–1	1–0	6–1	5–0	3–0	6–0	3–1	4–1	2–1	4–1	2–0	3–1		2–0
West Bromwich Albion	4–1	4–2	0–1	0–2	0–0	1–1	0–1	4–0	0–2	6–1	4–3	1–0	0–2	2–0	2–0	0–2	0–2	

Updated to match(es) played on unknown. Source: Ian Laschke: Rothmans Book of Football League Records 1888–89 to 1978–79. Macdonald and Jane’s, London & Sydney, 1980.
Legend: Blue = home team win; Yellow = draw; Red = away team win.

=== Maps ===
Locations of the Football League Second Division teams

== Attendances ==
=== Division One ===
No.	Club	Average
1	Newcastle United FC	21,605
2	Woolwich Arsenal	19,980
3	Everton FC	19,155
4	Manchester City FC	18,715
5	Aston Villa FC	18,390
6	Birmingham City FC	14,540
7	Sunderland AFC	14,510
8	Sheffield United FC	14,450
9	The Wednesday	12,880
10	Middlesbrough FC	11,685
11	Blackburn Rovers FC	11,145
12	Nottingham Forest FC	11,030
13	Preston North End FC	9,795
14	Bury FC	9,145
15	Derby County FC	8,915
16	Notts County FC	8,090
17	Stoke City FC	7,470
18	Wolverhampton Wanderers FC	7,380

== See also ==
- 1904–05 in English football
- 1904 in association football
- 1905 in association football
