= Thomas Lloyd =

Thomas Lloyd may refer to:

== Government ==
- Sir Thomas Lloyd, 1st Baronet (1820–1877), Welsh politician
- Thomas Lloyd (lieutenant governor) (1640–1694), Lieutenant Governor of Pennsylvania, 1684–1688
- Thomas Edward Lloyd (1820–1909), British Member of Parliament for Cardiganshire, 1874–1880
- Thomas Lloyd (Irish politician) (1716–1805), Irish politician
- Thomas Lloyd (1814–1890), British politician, member of parliament for Barnstaple
- Thomas Lloyd, Coedmore (1793–1857), landowner and Lord Lieutenant of Cardiganshire
- Thomas Ingram Kynaston Lloyd (1896–1968), British civil servant

== Religion ==
- Thomas Lloyd (lexicographer) (c. 1673–1734), Welsh cleric and lexicographer
- Thomas Richard Lloyd (1820–1891), Welsh priest and bard (Yr Estyn)
- Thomas Lloyd (bishop) (1857–1935), Welsh Anglican suffragan bishop
- Thomas Lloyd (priest, born 1824) (1824–1896), archdeacon of Salop
- Thomas Lloyd (priest, born 1709) (1709–1793), dean of Bangor

== Others ==
- Thomas F. Lloyd (1841–1911), founder of Carrboro, North Carolina and mill owner
- Thomas Lloyd (stenographer) (1756–1827), published the Congressional Register, known as the "Father of American Shorthand"
- Thomas Lloyd (rugby union) (1882–1938), Welsh international rugby union forward
- Thomas Lloyd (cricketer), English cricketer
- Thomas Alwyn Lloyd (1881–1960), Welsh architect and town planner
- Thomas Lloyd (naval architect) (1803–1875), English naval architect and engineer
- Thomas Lloyd (garrison commander) (d. 1710), British army officer

== See also ==
- Tom Lloyd (disambiguation)
