= Raul Jorge =

Portuguese footballer

Personal information
- Full name: Raul Jorge da Silva
- Date of birth: 18 November 1903
- Place of birth: Portugal
- Date of death: Unknown
- Position: Forward

Senior career*
Years	Team	Apps	(Gls)
- Barreirense

International career
1929–1933	Portugal	5	(0)
- * Club domestic league appearances and goals

"Raul Jorge da Silva (born 18 November 1903, died 1994) was a Portuguese footballer who played as forward".
