= Hervé Marc =

French footballer (1903–1946)

Personal information
- Date of birth: 12 October 1903
- Date of death: 24 December 1946 (aged 43)

International career
Years	Team	Apps	(Gls)
1930	France	1	(0)

Hervé Marc (12 October 1903 – 24 December 1946) was a French footballer. He played in one match for the France national football team in 1930.
