= Fred Hilton (footballer) =

English footballer

Personal information
- Full name: Frederick Hilton
- Date of birth: 8 July 1903
- Place of birth: Sheffield, England
- Height: 5 ft 11 in (1.80 m)
- Position: Wing half

Senior career*
Years	Team	Apps	(Gls)
1921–1922	Lopham Street		
1922–1925	Grimsby Town	71	(0)
1925–1930	Notts County	109	(3)
1930–1931	Scunthorpe & Lindsey United		
1931–1934	Gainsborough Trinity		
1934–193?	Lincoln Wednesday		
- * Club domestic league appearances and goals

Frederick Hilton (born 8 July 1903) was an English professional footballer who played as a wing half.
