= 1904 in association football =

The following are the football (soccer) events of the year 1904 throughout the world.

== Events ==
- 28 February: S.L. Benfica is founded.
- April - Woolwich Arsenal become the first Southern club to win promotion to the English top flight.
- 4 May: FC Schalke 04 is founded.
- 1 July: Bayer 04 Leverkusen is founded.
- August: Leeds City is founded.
- 4 October: IFK Göteborg is founded.
- Germany: SC Freiburg is founded.

== Winners club national championship ==
- Hungary:
  - Hungarian National Championship I: MTK, first-time champions
- Italy:
  - Italian Football Championship: Genoa C.F.C.
- Scotland:
  - Scottish Division One – Third Lanark
  - Scottish Division Two – Hamilton Academical
  - Scottish Cup – Celtic

== International tournaments ==
- 1904 British Home Championship (February 29 – April 9, 1904)

England

- Olympic Games in St. Louis, United States (November 16–23, 1904)
  1. Canada (Galt Football Club)
  2. United States (Christian Brothers College)
  3. United States (St. Rose Parish)

== Births ==
- January 21 – Puck van Heel, Dutch footballer (died 1984)
- January 23 – Harry Rowley, English footballer (died 1982)
- September 1 – George Biswell, English club footballer (died 1981)
- September 13 – Luigi Bertolini, Italian footballer (died 1977)
- November 29 – Héctor Castro, Uruguayan footballer (died 1960)
