= Harry Callachan =

Indian footballer (1903–1990)

Personal information
- Full name: Henry Callachan
- Date of birth: 9 April 1903
- Place of birth: Madras, British India
- Date of death: 11 February 1990 (aged 86)
- Position: Full back

Senior career*
Years	Team	Apps	(Gls)
–	Kirkintilloch Rob Roy		
–	Parkhead Juniors		
1925–1927	Celtic	11	(0)
–	Alloa Athletic		
–	Beith		
1927–1928	Leicester City	3	(0)
–	Tunbridge Wells Rangers		
–	Burton Town		
1932–1933	Wigan Athletic		
–	Market Harborough Town		
- * Club domestic league appearances and goals

Henry Callachan (9 April 1903 – 11 February 1990) was a footballer who played in the Scottish Football League for Celtic and in the English Football League for Leicester City. He also played for Wigan Athletic, making 40 appearances in the Cheshire League.
