= Tommy Lloyd (footballer) =

English footballer

Personal information
- Full name: Thomas Lloyd
- Date of birth: 17 November 1903
- Place of birth: Wednesbury, England
- Date of death: 20 January 1984 (aged 80)
- Place of death: Bradford, England
- Height: 5 ft 9 in (1.75 m)
- Position: Full-back

Senior career*
Years	Team	Apps	(Gls)
1922–1924	Walsall	5	(0)
1924–1925	Willenhall		
1925–1927	Sunderland	4	(0)
1927–1937	Bradford Park Avenue	328	(17)
1937–19??	Burton Town		
- * Club domestic league appearances and goals

Thomas Lloyd (17 November 1903 – 20 January 1984) was an English professional footballer who played as a full-back for Sunderland.
