= Tyne–Tees derby =

Football rivalry in north-eastern England

Tyne-Tees derby
- Location: North East
- Teams: Newcastle United F.C. Middlesbrough F.C.
- First meeting: Newcastle United 2–3 Middlesbrough; 1892–93 FA Cup (21 January 1893)
- Latest meeting: Middlesbrough 2–2 Newcastle United; 2009–10 Football League Championship (13 March 2010)
- Next meeting: TBD
- Stadiums: Riverside Stadium (Middlesbrough); St James' Park (Newcastle United)

Statistics
- Total meetings: 129
- Most wins: Newcastle United (51)
- All-time series: Middlesbrough: 40; Draw: 38; Newcastle United: 51
- Largest victory: Newcastle United 0–5 Middlesbrough; 1930–31 First Division (14 February 1931); Newcastle United 6–1 Middlesbrough; 1962–63 Division Two (29 August 1962)

The Tyne–Tees derby is a term used by both Middlesbrough and Newcastle fans, along with the media for a football match between Newcastle United and Middlesbrough.

The fixture had increased importance in the late 1990s and early 2000s, as the only all North-East fixture of the season, since at the time Newcastle United and Middlesbrough were Premier League teams (while Sunderland was largely outside the top flight at the time). Both teams enjoyed a degree of success in this period: Newcastle qualified in for the Champions League and challenged for the Premier League title. Middlesbrough, with high-profile players including Juninho, Fabrizio Ravanelli, Jimmy Floyd Hasselbaink and Mark Viduka, reached five major cup finals from 1997 to 2006, including the 2006 UEFA Cup Final and lifted the 2004 League Cup.

As of the 2025/26 season, The Tyne-Tees Derby has not been played in 15 seasons, owing to the two clubs being in separate divisions. In 2015/16 Middlesbrough were promoted back to the Premier League, however Newcastle were themselves relegated meaning the two sides swapped divisions. At the end of the 2016/17 season, Newcastle won immediate promotion from The Championship but Middlesbrough were relegated from the Premier League after a solitary season, meaning the wait for a Tyne-Tees Derby would continue.

Middlesbrough play their home games at the Riverside Stadium, while Newcastle United play their home games at St. James' Park.

Despite the derby element to the match up, Newcastle fans do not consider Middlesbrough a derby rival, insisting only Sunderland serves this role. It's often commented that Middlesbrough are closer to traditionally and stylistically to Leeds United.

== Results ==
The following table shows results from matches between Newcastle and Middlesbrough since 1988.

Date	Competition	Venue	Result	Notes
13 Mar 2010	Championship	Riverside Stadium	Middlesbrough 2–2 Newcastle	
20 Dec 2009	Championship	St James' Park	Newcastle 2–0 Middlesbrough	First Tyne–Tees derby outside of the top division in 18 years; set the attendance record for a Championship fixture, with a crowd of 49,644
11 May 2009	Premier League	St James' Park	Newcastle 3–1 Middlesbrough	Newcastle moved out of the relegation zone on goal difference, but ultimately both teams went down
29 Nov 2008	Premier League	Riverside Stadium	Middlesbrough 0–0 Newcastle	
3 Feb 2008	Premier League	St James' Park	Newcastle 1–1 Middlesbrough	
26 Aug 2007	Premier League	Riverside Stadium	Middlesbrough 2–2 Newcastle	
3 Apr 2007	Premier League	St James' Park	Newcastle 0–0 Middlesbrough	
22 Oct 2006	Premier League	Riverside Stadium	Middlesbrough 1–0 Newcastle	
9 Apr 2006	Premier League	Riverside Stadium	Middlesbrough 1–2 Newcastle	
2 Jan 2006	Premier League	St James' Park	Newcastle 2–2 Middlesbrough	
27 Apr 2005	Premier League	St James' Park	Newcastle 0–0 Middlesbrough	
14 Aug 2004	Premier League	Riverside Stadium	Middlesbrough 2–2 Newcastle	
21 Feb 2004	Premier League	St James' Park	Newcastle 2–1 Middlesbrough	
19 Oct 2003	Premier League	Riverside Stadium	Middlesbrough 0–1 Newcastle	
5 Mar 2003	Premier League	Riverside Stadium	Middlesbrough 1–0 Newcastle	
4 Nov 2002	Premier League	St James' Park	Newcastle 2–0 Middlesbrough	
26 Dec 2001	Premier League	St James' Park	Newcastle 3–0 Middlesbrough	
8 Sep 2001	Premier League	Riverside Stadium	Middlesbrough 1–4 Newcastle	
17 Mar 2001	Premier League	St James' Park	Newcastle 1–2 Middlesbrough	
16 Oct 2000	Premier League	Riverside Stadium	Middlesbrough 1–3 Newcastle	
2 May 2000	Premier League	Riverside Stadium	Middlesbrough 2–2 Newcastle	
3 Oct 1999	Premier League	St James' Park	Newcastle 2–1 Middlesbrough	
1 May 1999	Premier League	St James' Park	Newcastle 1–1 Middlesbrough	
6 Dec 1998	Premier League	Riverside Stadium	Middlesbrough 2–2 Newcastle	
22 Feb 1997	Premier League	Riverside Stadium	Middlesbrough 0–1 Newcastle	
27 Nov 1996	League Cup 4th round	Riverside Stadium	Middlesbrough 3–1 Newcastle	
3 Nov 1996	Premier League	St James' Park	Newcastle 3–1 Middlesbrough	
10 Feb 1996	Premier League	Riverside Stadium	Middlesbrough 1–2 Newcastle	
30 Aug 1995	Premier League	St James' Park	Newcastle 1–0 Middlesbrough	
7 Oct 1992	League Cup 2nd round	Ayresome Park	Middlesbrough 1–3 Newcastle	Second leg of two-legged tie; Newcastle won 3–1 on aggregate
23 Sep 1992	League Cup 2nd round	St James' Park	Newcastle 0–0 Middlesbrough	First leg of two-legged tie
26 Dec 1991	Second Division	St James' Park	Newcastle 0–1 Middlesbrough	
27 Aug 1991	Second Division	Ayresome Park	Middlesbrough 3–0 Newcastle	
12 Mar 1991	Second Division	Ayresome Park	Middlesbrough 3–0 Newcastle	
10 Oct 1990	League Cup 2nd round	St James' Park	Newcastle 1–0 Middlesbrough	Second leg of two-legged tie; Middlesbrough won 2–1 on aggregate
3 Oct 1990	Second Division	St James' Park	Newcastle 0–0 Middlesbrough	Second of three meetings between the sides in 15 days
25 Sep 1990	League Cup 2nd round	Ayresome Park	Middlesbrough 2–0 Newcastle	First leg of two-legged tie
5 May 1990	Second Division	Ayresome Park	Middlesbrough 4–1 Newcastle	Middlesbrough avoided relegation and Newcastle missed out on promotion as a result of this game
23 Jan 1990	Full Members' Cup	Ayresome Park	Middlesbrough 1–0 Newcastle	Northern section semifinal
4 Nov 1989	Second Division	St James' Park	Newcastle 2–2 Middlesbrough	
26 Feb 1989	First Division	Ayresome Park	Middlesbrough 2–2 Newcastle	
26 Oct 1988	First Division	St James' Park	Newcastle 3–0 Middlesbrough	

== Statistics ==
As of 6 January 2024

=== Statistics ===
Competition	Middlesbrough wins	Draws	Newcastle United wins	Middlesbrough goals	Newcastle United goals
League	35	36	45	129	153
FA Cup	2	0	2	7	9
League Cup	2	1	2	6	5
Full Members' Cup	1	0	0	1	0
Anglo-Scottish Cup	0	1	1	2	5
Texaco Cup	0	0	1	0	4
Total	40	38	51	146	176

Chart of yearly comparative table positions of Middlesbrough and Newcastle in the football league system.

== See also ==
- Tyne-Wear derby
- Tees–Wear derby
