= Tees–Wear derby =

Football rivalry in England

- Other names: Wear-Tees derby, North East derby or A19 derby
- Location: North East
- Teams: Middlesbrough; Sunderland
- First meeting: 26 November 1887; FA Cup; Middlesbrough 2–2 Sunderland
- Latest meeting: 3 February 2025; EFL Championship; Middlesbrough 2–3 Sunderland
- Stadiums: Riverside Stadium (Middlesbrough); Stadium of Light (Sunderland)

Statistics
- Total meetings: 155
- Most wins: Sunderland (64)
- All-time record: Sunderland: 64; Draw: 39; Middlesbrough: 52

The Tees–Wear derby is a football local derby contested between Middlesbrough F.C. and Sunderland A.F.C. who are separated by 2 rivers and 23 miles (direct), in the North East of England. It is the oldest competitive football derby fixture in the North East.

Broadly, Sunderland fans based in the City of Sunderland and further north towards Tyneside focus most of their attention on Newcastle United. Middlesbrough is not considered a major rival in these areas primarily due to the increased distance from Teesside, and the lack of regular interaction with Teessiders. The rivalry of the Tees–Wear derby, however, is much more intense and evenly balanced in southern County Durham, where fans of both clubs live and work close together and interact regularly. There is also an increased feeling of rivalry between fans of older generations who experienced greater crowd troubles between the two clubs during the 1970s and 1980s when British football hooliganism was at its highest levels.

== History ==
Formations and early years: 1887 - 1939

Chart of yearly table positions of Middlesbrough and Sunderland in the football league system.

The two clubs first met competitively on 26 Nov 1887 in the FA Cup, making this the oldest competitive football derby in the North East (the first competitive Tyne–Wear derby took place in 1888). Sunderland were elected into the top division of the English Football League in 1890 where they remained until relegation in 1958. Middlesbrough were not elected into the league until 1899, entering into the second tier. They were promoted in 1902 and so the first League meeting took place on 20 December 1902, a 1-0 Sunderland win at Middlesbrough's Linthorpe Road Ground.

Sunderland were considerably more successful in the early years. In the 9 years before Middlesbrough had even joined the Football League, Sunderland had won the top division 3 times. Sunderland would go on to win the top division again in 1902, 1913 and 1936, also winning the FA Cup in 1937. Middlesbrough's highest league finish during this period was 3rd in the 1913-1914 season (their highest league finish to date). In the years up to the break in the football league for World War 2 in September 1939, Sunderland had spent every season in the top flight. Middlesbrough spent 7 outside the top flight (including its initial 3 seasons). Sunderland also had a significantly superior head to head record.

Sunderland vs Middlesbrough head to head results 1887 - 1939:

	Games	Sunderland wins	Draws	Middlesbrough wins
Total	63	34	14	15

Head to head honours 1887 - 1939:

Team	League	FA Cup	Total
Sunderland	6	1	7
Middlesbrough	0	0	0

Head to head seasons per league 1887 - 1939:

Team	First Division (top)	Second Division (second)	Third Division (third)	Total
Sunderland	45	0	0	45
Middlesbrough	29	7	0	36

Post war to present day

Since the recommencement of the football league in 1946, Sunderland have no longer dominated the rivalry. Both clubs have suffered multiple relegations, including dropping into the 3rd tier (Sunderland for 5 seasons and Middlesbrough for 2), and neither have come close to winning a top division title.

Sunderland won an unlikely second FA Cup in 1973, beating defending champions and top flight contenders Leeds United 1–0 at Wembley Stadium. Sunderland were a mid-table second tier side at the time, making their win one of the greatest FA Cup upsets of all time.

More recently, Middlesbrough have been more successful in cup competitions, reaching five major cup finals from 1997 to 2006. Middlesbrough won the 2004 League Cup, their first major silverware, which also qualified them for European football for the following season. Middlesbrough's qualification was the second time either side qualified for a major European competition as Sunderland had first played in the 1973–74 European Cup Winners' Cup. Middlesbrough qualified for Europe a second successive season, ultimately reaching the UEFA Cup Final in 2006, but losing to Sevilla.

Whilst Sunderland have spent more seasons competing in the top tier of English football across this period, it is Middlesbrough who has led in their head-to-head record.

Sunderland vs Middlesbrough head to head results 1946 - present:

	Games	Sunderland wins	Draws	Middlesbrough wins
Total	92	30	25	37

Table correct as of 3 February 2025

Head to head honours 1946 - present day:

Team	League	FA Cup	League Cup	Total
Sunderland	0	1	0	1
Middlesbrough	0	0	1	1

Table correct as of 18 May 2024

Head to head seasons per league 1946 - present:

Team	First Division/ Premier League (top)	Second Division/ Championship (second)	Third Division/ League 1 (third)	Total
Sunderland	41	32	5	78
Middlesbrough	32	44	2	78

Table correct as of 18 May 2024

Recent results

In the 2008–09 Premier League season, the results were:

- Sunderland 2–0 Middlesbrough
- Middlesbrough 1–1 Sunderland

In 2011–12 the teams played in the FA Cup:

- Sunderland 1–1 Middlesbrough (28 January 2012)
- Replay – Middlesbrough 1–2 (a.e.t.) Sunderland (8 February 2012)

In 2012–13 the teams played in the Football League Cup

- Sunderland 0–1 Middlesbrough 30 October 2012

In the 2016–17 Premier League season, the results were:

- Sunderland 1–2 Middlesbrough
- Middlesbrough 1–0 Sunderland

In the 2017–18 EFL Championship season, the results were:

- Middlesbrough 1–0 Sunderland
- Sunderland 3–3 Middlesbrough

In 2017–18 the teams played in the FA Cup:

- Middlesbrough 2–0 Sunderland (6 January 2018)

In the 2022–23 EFL Championship season, the results were:

- Middlesbrough 1–0 Sunderland
- Sunderland 2–0 Middlesbrough

In the 2023–24 EFL Championship season, the results were:

- Sunderland 0–4 Middlesbrough
- Middlesbrough 1–1 Sunderland

In the 2024–25 EFL Championship season, the results were:

- Sunderland 1–0 Middlesbrough
- Middlesbrough 2–3 Sunderland

== Fans and Stadia ==
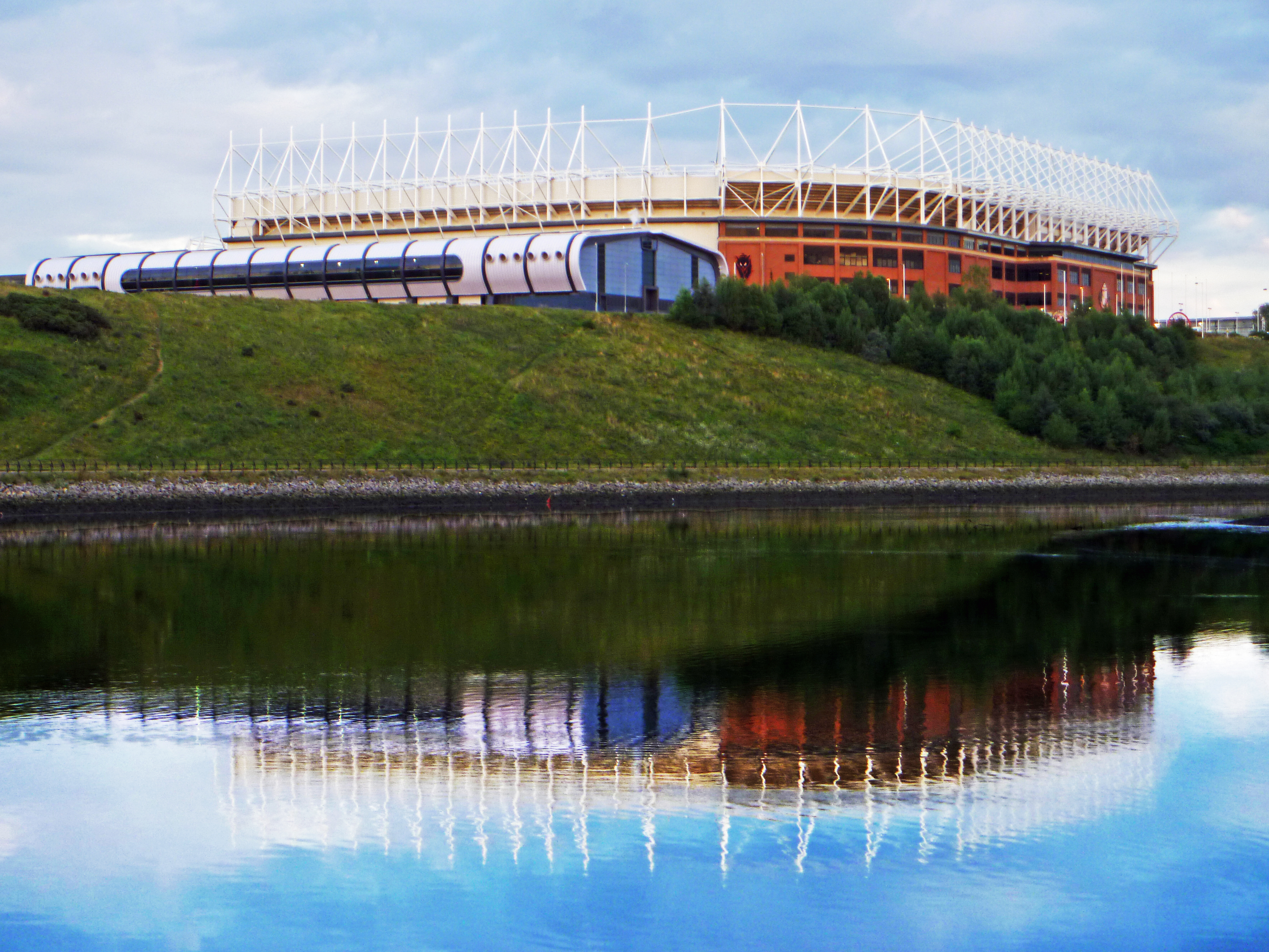
Stadium of Light

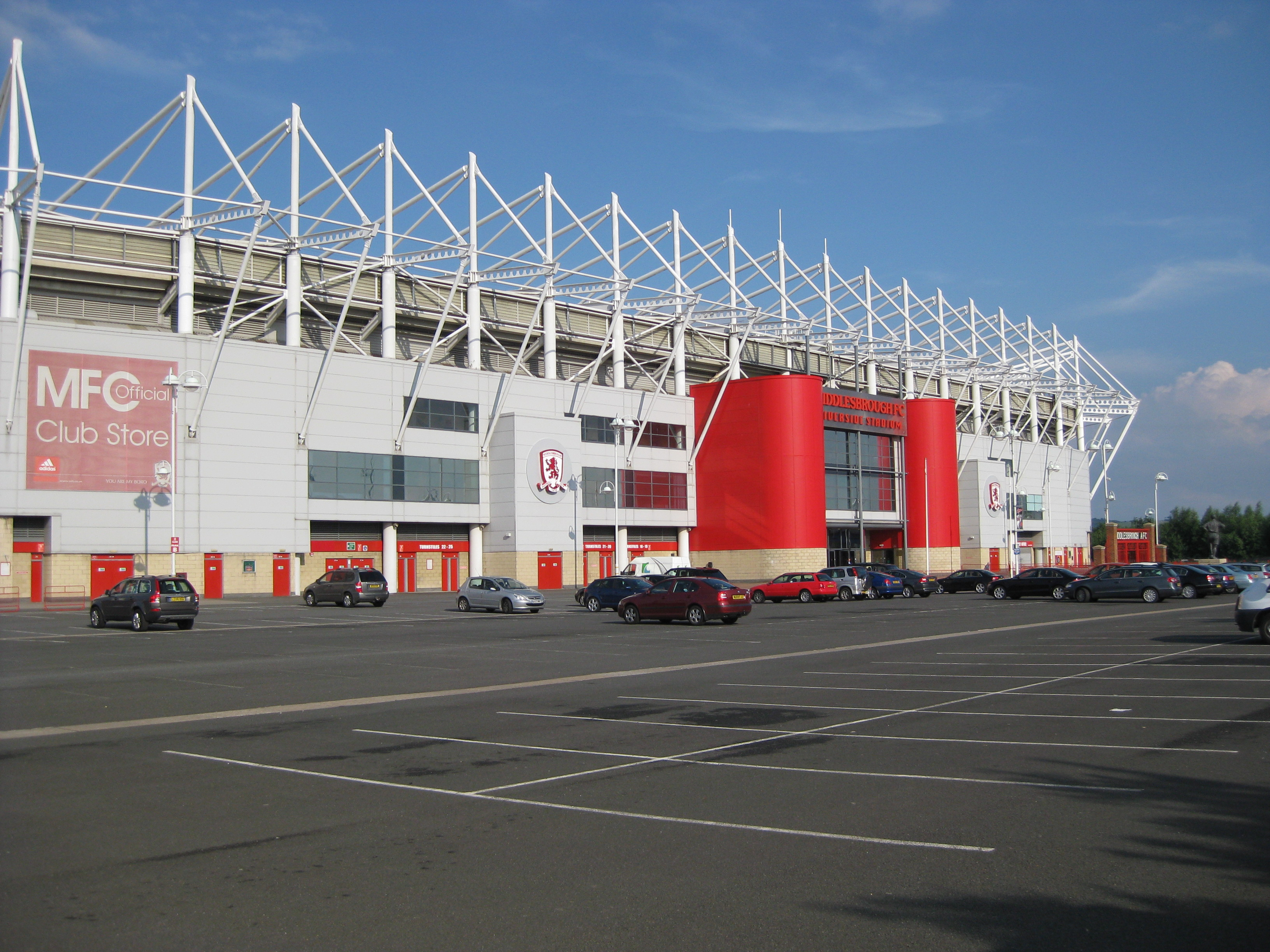
Riverside Stadium

Previously Sunderland played their home games at Roker Park, and Middlesbrough at Ayresome Park, however both clubs were two of the earliest to relocate to new purpose built all seater stadiums following the Hillsborough disaster and subsequent Taylor Report.

Middlesbrough have played at the Riverside Stadium since 1995, the first purpose built all seater stadium in the UK after the Taylor Report. Sunderland shortly followed, moving into the Stadium of Light in 1997. The Riverside was originally built to a capacity of c. 30,000, which was extended to c. 35,000 in 1998. The Stadium of Light was originally built to a capacity of c. 42,000, which was also extended, to c. 49,000, in 2000.

Historically, there has been significant crowd trouble at matches between Sunderland and Middlesbrough, both home and away. Generally, football related violence between the two sets of fans has reduced since Middlesbrough left Ayresome Park and Sunderland left Roker Park. This is in part due to the easier policing of matches at the new stadiums. However, heightened police presence is still required when the teams meet, as the fixture can lead to violent incidents between fans. Sunderland regularly reduce Middlesbrough's away allocations due to safety concerns and previous misconduct.

The rivalry intensified during the late 1990s when the two teams battled for promotion to, and survival in, the Premier League. The rivalry has seen a resurgence again since Sunderland's relegation to the Championship in 2017. The league match at the Stadium of Light in February 2018 was the most heavily policed match in the entire league that season.

== Notable representatives to cross the divide ==
Middlesbrough was founded in 1876, with Sunderland founded just 3 years later in 1879. Since then, there have been a number of occasions where notable individuals for both clubs have crossed the dividing line.

In 1905, Alf Common became the first footballer in history to be transferred for a fee of £1,000 on his transfer from Sunderland to Middlesbrough.

Following an irreparable fallout with the majority of his teammates, in July 1961, Brian Clough issued a transfer request that was accepted by Middlesbrough, and he moved to Sunderland for £55,000. After having scored 197 goals in 213 appearances for Middlesbrough, Clough went on to score a total of 54 goals in 61 matches for Sunderland before a his career was ended prematurely by a knee injury.

After a short stint at Wigan Athletic, Middlesbrough academy graduate, one time youngest-ever captain and 69 appearance maker Lee Cattermole, moved to Sunderland. He went on to captain Sunderland, amassing 233 appearances for the club.

Sunderland academy graduate midfielder Grant Leadbitter captained both clubs either side of a period at Ipswich Town. He played in a total of 180 games for Sunderland across two periods either side of a 7 year stint at Middlesbrough where he made 212 appearances. Leadbitter played a significant role in Sunderland's promotion winning season of 2006–07 and Middlesbrough's promotion winning season of 2015–16.

Former Middlesbrough captain and manager Tony Mowbray controversially accepted the Sunderland head coach job in August 2022. As a promising young local academy graduate at Middlesbrough, Mowbray remained loyal to the club through the liquidation in 1986, leading the club on the pitch to back to back promotions from the old English Third Division up to the top league of English football. As manager, Mowbray led Sunderland to an unlikely 6th place finish in the 2022–23 Championship, ultimately losing the subsequent two legged Playoff semi final to eventual winners Luton Town.

== Summary of all time results ==
As of 5 February 2025

	Games	Sunderland wins	Draws	Middlesbrough wins	Sunderland goals	Middlesbrough goals
League	138	59	33	46	201	177
FA Cup	9	4	3	2	15	13
League Cup	6	1	1	4	3	8
Other Competitions*	2	0	0	2	2	4
Total	155	64	37	54	221	202

* 1974 Texaco Cup and 1975 Anglo-Scottish Cup

== Summary of all time seasons per league ==
As of 18 May 2024

Team	First Division/ Premier League (top)	Second Division/ Championship (second)	Third Division/ League 1 (third)	Total
Sunderland	87	32	5	124
Middlesbrough	61	51	2	114

== Major Honours ==
Sunderland

- First Division (level 1)
  - Champions: 1891–92, 1892–93, 1894–95, 1901–02, 1912–13, 1935–36
- FA Cup
  - Winners: 1936–37, 1972–73

Middlesbrough

- League Cup
  - Winners: 2003–04

Team	League	FA Cup	Football League Cup	Total
Sunderland	6	2	0	8
Middlesbrough	0	0	1	1

Table correct as of 18 May 2024

== See also ==
- Tyne–Tees derby
- Tyne–Wear derby
