= Cole Palmer =

English footballer (born 2002)

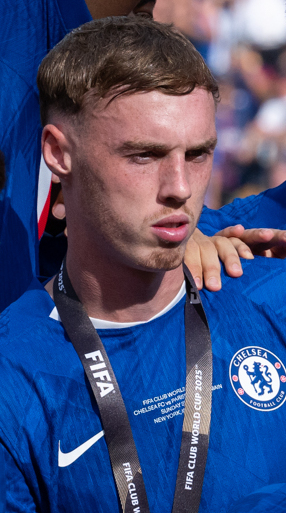
- Palmer with Chelsea in 2025

Personal information
- Full name: Cole Jermaine Palmer
- Date of birth: 6 May 2002 (age 24)
- Place of birth: Manchester, England
- Height: 6 ft 1 in (1.85 m)
- Positions: Attacking midfielder; winger

Team information
- Current team: Chelsea
- Number: 10

Youth career
- NJ Wythenshawe
- 2010–2020: Manchester City

Senior career*
Years	Team	Apps	(Gls)
2020–2023	Manchester City	19	(0)
2023–	Chelsea	107	(50)

International career^{‡}
2017	England U16	2	(0)
2019	England U17	3	(0)
2019	England U18	9	(2)
2021–2023	England U21	15	(5)
2023–	England	14	(2)
Medal record
Men's football
Representing England
UEFA European Under-21 Championship
Winner	2023 Georgia-Romania	Team
UEFA European Championship
Runner-up	2024 Germany	Team
- * Club domestic league appearances and goals as of 17:32, 21 November 2026 (UTC) ‡ National team caps and goals as of 22:10, 31 March 2026 (UTC)

Cole Jermaine Palmer (born 6 May 2002) is an English professional footballer who plays as an attacking midfielder or winger for Premier League club Chelsea and the England national team. He is known for his dribbling, shooting and passing ability.

An academy graduate of Manchester City, Palmer made his senior debut for the club in 2020, and was later part of their squad that won a continental treble of the Premier League, FA Cup, and UEFA Champions League in 2023. He signed for Chelsea that year for a fee of £40 million and enjoyed a breakout debut season, earning multiple honours—including the PFA Fans' Player of the Year and Young Player of the Year awards. In 2025, Palmer helped Chelsea win both the UEFA Conference League and the FIFA Club World Cup, being named man of the match in both finals and receiving the Golden Ball in the latter.

Palmer has represented England across various youth levels, including winning the 2023 UEFA European Under-21 Championship, before making his senior debut in the same year. He represented his country at UEFA Euro 2024, scoring the equalising goal in the final.

== Early life and education ==
Cole Jermaine Palmer was born on 6 May 2002 in Wythenshawe, Manchester. He and his sister were raised by a dental engineer father and a dyslexia assessor mother. Palmer's father played Sunday league football for nearly two decades, and Palmer regularly watched him. Growing up in Wythenshawe, he started playing football in his local grassroots club NJ Wythenshawe.

Palmer attended Gatley Primary School in Stockport, and was later privately educated at St Bede's College in partnership with the Manchester City Academy.

== Club career ==
=== Manchester City ===
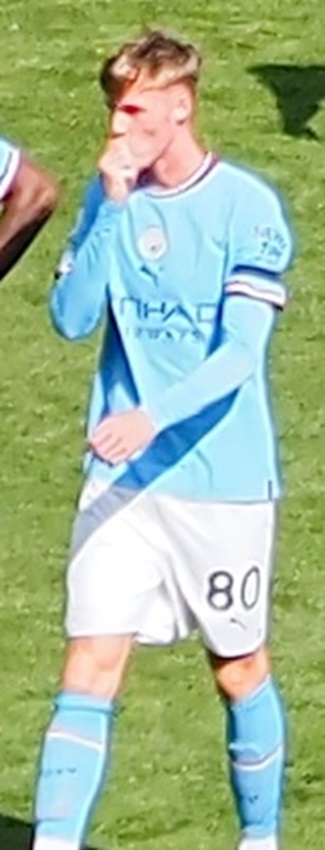
Palmer in 2022

Despite being a Manchester United fan, Palmer joined Manchester City in 2010 at the under-eight level and progressed through the Academy age groups before captaining the under-18s during the 2019–20 season. He had faced concerns from the age of 14 that his physique was too slight for professional football, and academy coaches wanted to release him at 16, but academy director Jason Wilcox rejected their decision.

On 30 September 2020, Palmer made his first-team debut for City in a 3–0 away win over Burnley in the fourth round of the EFL Cup. On 21 September 2021, he scored his first goal in a 6–1 home win over League One team Wycombe Wanderers in the third round of the EFL Cup. On 16 October, Palmer made an appearance in the Premier League against Burnley, and scored a hat-trick for City's under-23 side that same night. On 19 October, Palmer scored as a substitute in a 5–1 away win over Club Brugge in the group stage of the UEFA Champions League, marking his first goal in European football. On 7 January 2022, Palmer scored on his FA Cup debut in a 4–1 away win over League Two team Swindon Town.

==== 2022–23 season ====
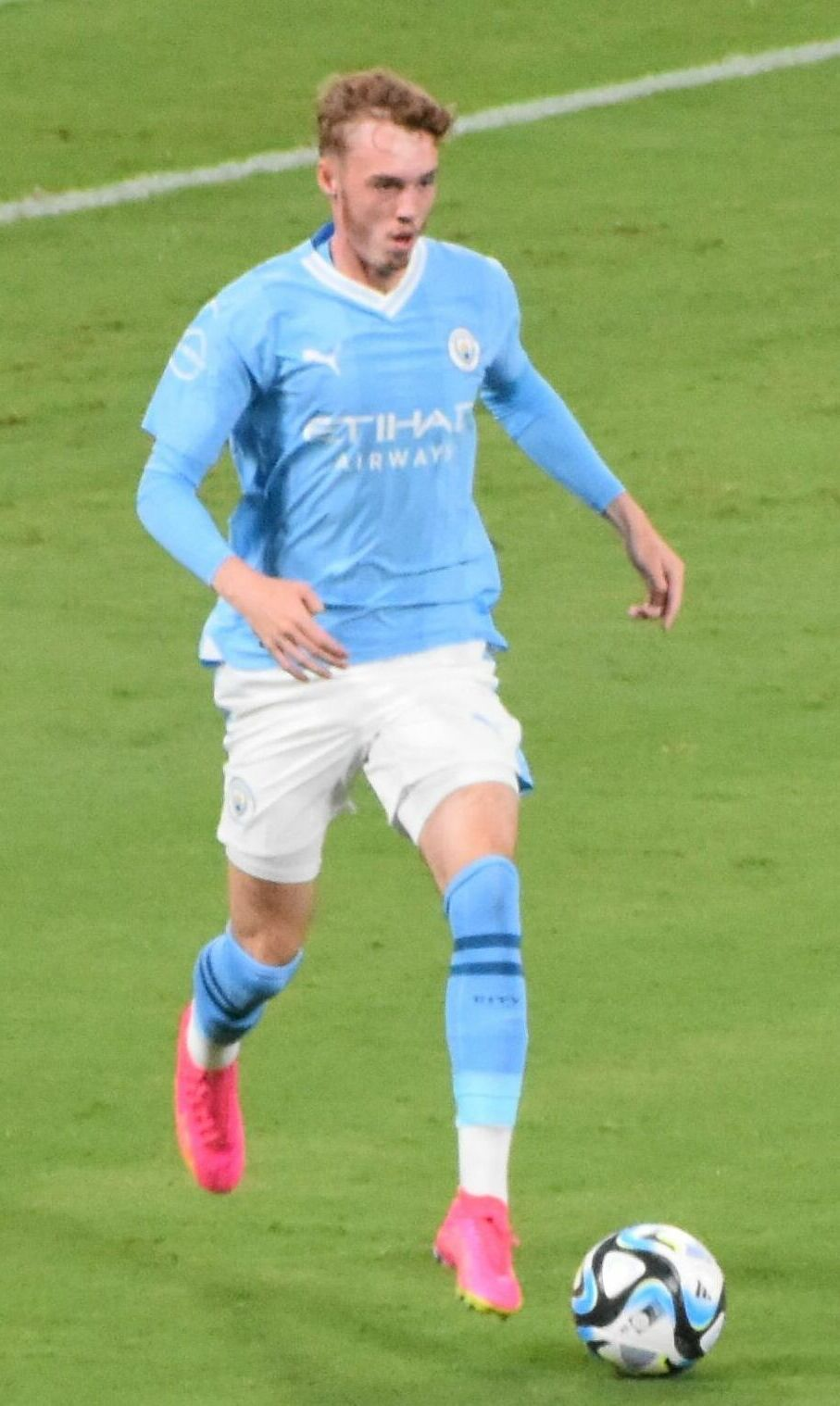
Palmer playing for Manchester City in 2023

Palmer saw increased involvement during the 2022–23 season, though still frequently featuring as a substitute. However, his 14 Premier League appearances contributed to Manchester City's title-winning campaign, claiming the title. On 18 March 2023, he scored the team's fifth goal in a dominant performance against Burnley during the FA Cup quarter-finals. Palmer also made four appearances during City's Champions League winning run.

On 6 August 2023, Palmer scored the first goal in the 2023 FA Community Shield against Arsenal, after coming on for Erling Haaland as a second-half substitute. However, Arsenal scored in stoppage time and eventually won the match in a penalty shoot-out. Ten days later, Palmer scored the equaliser in the 2023 UEFA Super Cup against Sevilla, which Manchester City won 5–4 in a penalty shoot-out after the match finished 1–1, in what would be his last appearance for the club.

=== Chelsea ===
==== 2023–24: Breakout season and young player of the season ====
On 1 September, Palmer signed for Premier League club Chelsea on a seven-year contract, with the option of a further year. The transfer fee was reported to be an initial £40 million, potentially rising by £2.5 million in add-ons. He made his debut the following day as a 62nd-minute substitute in a 1–0 home defeat to Nottingham Forest. On 7 October, Palmer scored his first goal for Chelsea, from a penalty kick, while also providing the assist for Nicolas Jackson's goal in a 4–1 away victory over Burnley. On 6 November, Palmer registered a goal and an assist in a 4–1 away win at London rivals Tottenham Hotspur. Six days later, Palmer scored a stoppage-time penalty against former club Manchester City, as the two teams played out a 4–4 draw at Stamford Bridge.

In Chelsea's final match of 2023, away to Luton Town, Palmer scored twice for the first time professionally, while also assisting Noni Madueke's goal, as Chelsea won 3–2. As a result of his performances during December, which included four goals and two assists, Palmer was nominated for the Premier League Player of the Month award, and his second goal against Luton Town was nominated for Premier League Goal of the Month. On 23 January 2024, Palmer scored another brace, this time in the EFL Cup semi-finals, as Chelsea defeated Middlesbrough 6–1 (6–2 on aggregate) to advance to the final at Wembley Stadium. He scored his tenth league goal of the season on 4 February in a 4–2 home defeat to Wolverhampton Wanderers, making him the first Chelsea player aged 21 or under to score 10 Premier League goals in a season. On 29 February, he was named the Men's Young Player of the Year at the 2024 London Football Awards. By assisting Axel Disasi's goal against Brentford on 2 March, Palmer became the Chelsea player with the most goal contributions in a season aged 21 or younger, overtaking Arjen Robben's tally of 16 contributions in 2004–05.

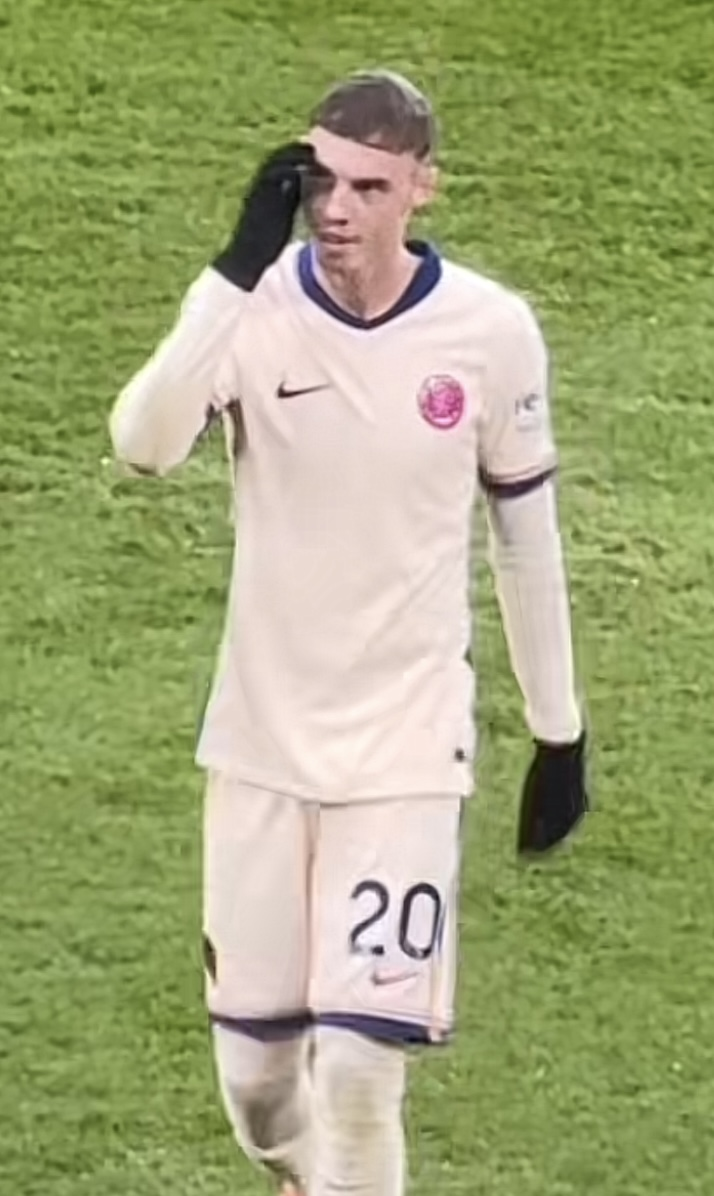
Palmer with Chelsea in 2024

On 4 April 2024, Palmer was nominated for the Premier League Player of the Month award a second time after more impressive displays throughout March that saw him score three goals and provide two assists. Later that day, he scored his first career hat-trick, which included two goals scored deep into added time to complete Chelsea's comeback in a 4–3 home victory against Manchester United. By doing so, Palmer became the 200th different player in Premier League history to score a hat-trick, as well as the third youngest to do so in a match against Manchester United. Palmer's performance in this match enabled him to become the third ever recipient of the Premier League Game Changer of the Season award. On 15 April, Palmer scored his second career hat-trick against Everton in a 6–0 home win, finishing the match with four goals, and thus became the 31st Premier League player to score four or more goals in a league game, and the first Chelsea player to score two Premier League hat-tricks for the club in a season. He set a record for the fastest perfect hat-trick to be scored in the Premier League, completing it within 29 minutes. He also became the third Chelsea player to score at least 20 goals in his debut Premier League season, following Jimmy Floyd Hasselbaink in 2000–01 and Diego Costa in 2014–15.

On 5 May, Palmer scored during a 5–0 home victory against West Ham United, becoming only the third player in Premier League history aged 21 or younger to contribute to 30 or more goals in a single season. Palmer was then named Chelsea Players' Player of the Season as well as Chelsea Player of the Season, voted for by supporters, as well as being awarded the Premier League Player of the Month award for April 2024 and the Premier League Goal of the Month award for his first goal against Everton, becoming the first player in Chelsea history and the fifth player overall to win the Player of the Month and Goal of the Month awards in the same month. On 11 May, Palmer made his 50th overall Premier League appearance, marking the occasion with an assist in a 3–2 away win at Nottingham Forest. By doing so, Palmer became the 13th player in Premier League history to score 20 or more goals and provide 10 or more assists in the same season.

Palmer finished the season with a total of 27 goals and 15 assists across all competitions; he had the most goal involvements (33: 22 goals, 11 assists) of any other player in the 2023–24 Premier League season. He won the Premier League Young Player of the Season and PFA Fans' Player of the Year awards for his outstanding first season at Chelsea while also being nominated for the Premier League Player of the Season and the FWA Footballer of the Year awards. His Goal of the Month winning strike against Everton in April was nominated for Premier League Goal of the Season.

==== 2024–25: Conference League and Club World Cup titles ====
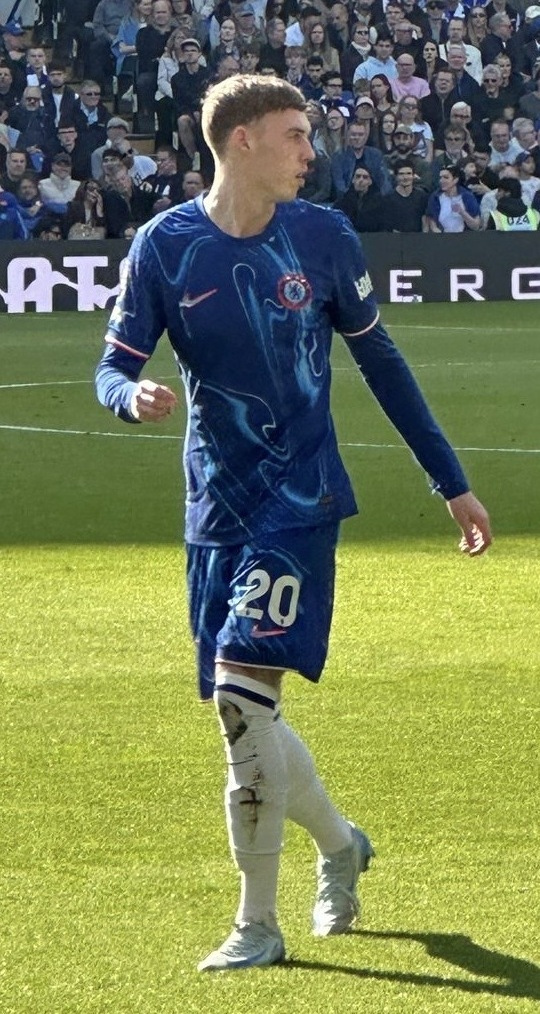
Palmer playing for Chelsea in 2025

Before the start of his second season, Palmer signed a new, nine-year contract with Chelsea, keeping him at the club until at least June 2033. On 20 August, Palmer was awarded the PFA Young Player of the Year award. Five days later, he scored his first goal of the campaign against Wolverhampton Wanderers at the Molineux Stadium. This goal would go on to win the Premier League Goal of the Month award for August 2024, making Palmer the first player in Premier League history to win the award twice in a row across two seasons. In the second half of the same match, Palmer assisted all three of Noni Madueke's goals, helping Chelsea defeat Wolves 6–2, with this performance being the catalyst of his nomination for August 2024's Premier League Player of the Month award.

In a 4–2 win against Brighton & Hove Albion on 28 September, Palmer scored four goals in the first half, becoming the first player to achieve this feat in the Premier League. On 11 October, Palmer was awarded Premier League Player of the Month for September, for his five goals and one assist during the month contributing to Chelsea's unbeaten record in September.

On 1 December, Palmer scored his 30th goal in the Premier League against Aston Villa in a 3–0 home victory, making him the second-fastest Chelsea player to score 30 league goals, with only Jimmy Floyd Hasselbaink achieving this feat in fewer matches. The following week, he scored two penalties in a thrilling 4–3 victory over Tottenham, the second of which was a panenka. With twelve penalties scored out of twelve penalties taken, Palmer's goals in this match earned him the outright Premier League record for the most penalties scored without a single miss, surpassing Yaya Touré's previous record of eleven. Throughout 2024, Palmer also broke the record for the Chelsea player with the most goal contributions in a calendar year in the Premier League, exceeding Hasselbaink's 36 goals and assists in 2001.

However, Palmer then underwent a period of poor form; amidst this, he missed a Premier League penalty for the first time against Leicester City on 9 March 2025. He failed to score in 11 Premier League matches by 21 April 2025. On 25 April, manager Enzo Maresca stated that Palmer's recent struggles on the pitch were "a mental thing". On 4 May 2025, he ended a goalless period of 18 games and 1,162 minutes with a goal against Liverpool.

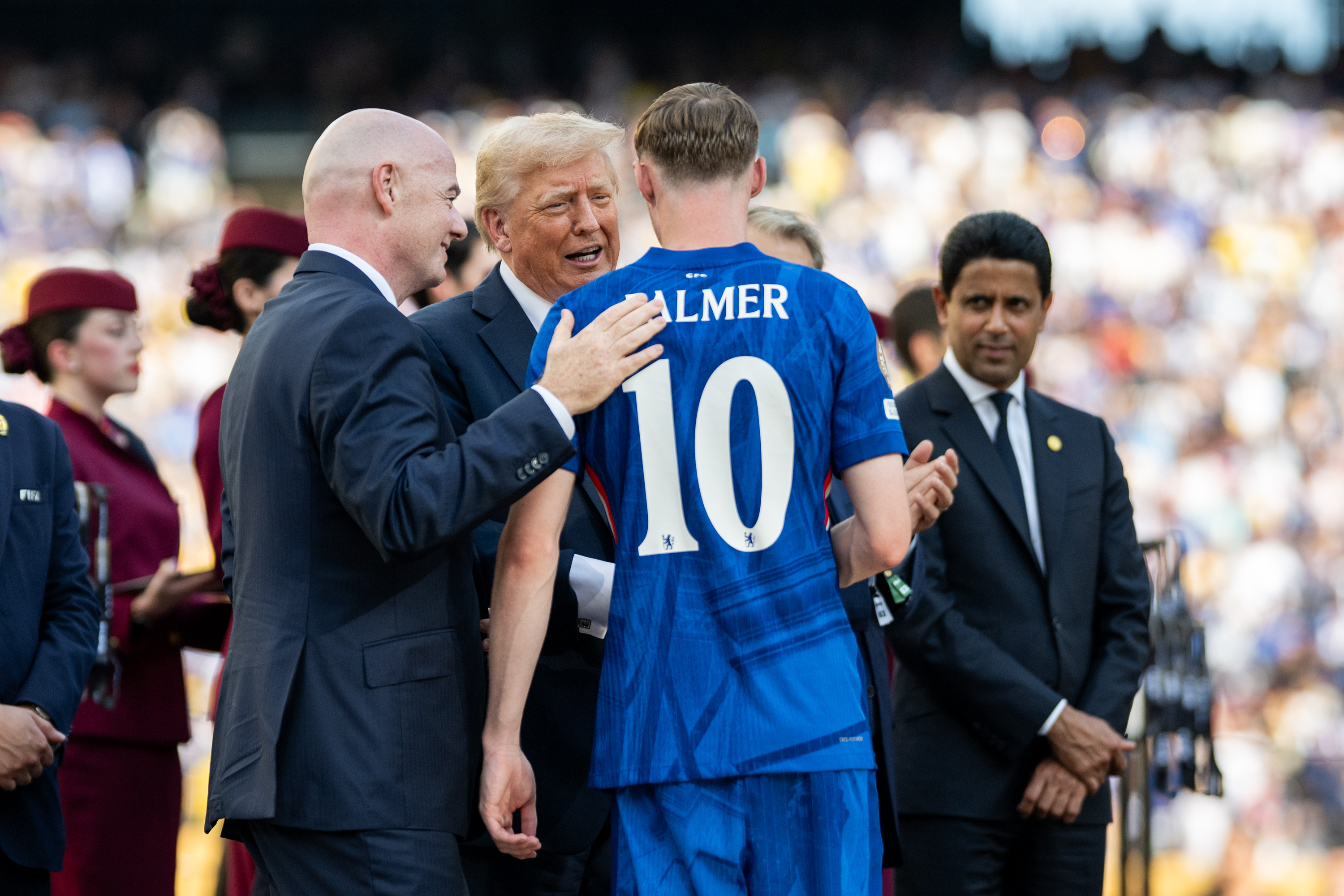
Palmer receiving the Golden Ball for the 2025 FIFA Club World Cup from U.S. president Donald Trump

On 28 May 2025, Palmer was named man of the match after providing two assists in the 2025 UEFA Conference League final against Real Betis, helping Chelsea become the first team to win all four major European competitions. Palmer was given the shirt number 10 before the 2025 FIFA Club World Cup, signifying his importance to the club. On 20 June, it was announced that Palmer was one of six nominees for the PFA Players' Player of the Year. Later that year, on 13 July, he scored twice and provided an assist in a 3–0 win over Paris Saint-Germain in the 2025 FIFA Club World Cup final, where he was named player of the match. He finished the tournament with three goals and two assists, earning the Golden Ball as the tournament's best player.

==== 2025–26: Injury and form struggles ====
On 22 August 2025, Palmer injured his groin during a pre-match warm-up against West Ham United. He returned to action on 13 September, coming off the bench to score his first goal of the season in a draw against Brentford. Four days later, he scored his second career Champions League goal in a 3–1 away defeat to Bayern Munich. However, following a recurrence of his groin injury in a league match against Manchester United on 20 September, as well as a fractured toe sustained in an accident, Palmer remained sidelined until 3 December, when he made a substitute appearance in a league match against Leeds United. On 13 December, he scored the opening goal in a 2–0 home win against Everton, before scoring a penalty against Bournemouth on 30 December.

On 7 February 2026, Palmer scored his fourth Premier League hat-trick against Wolverhampton Wanderers, with all three goals coming in the first half. With this feat, he became the first player to record three separate first-half hat-tricks in league history. His second goal, a penalty, also marked his 50th for Chelsea in all competitions.

==== 2026–27 ====
Under new manager Xabi Alonso, Palmer scored in each of Chelsea's first two Premier League matches of the 2026–27 season, against Fulham and Brighton & Hove Albion, earning nominations for Premier League Player of the Month and Goal of the Month awards for August. On 9 September, he scored twice as a substitute in a 6–3 comeback victory at home to Leeds United in the third round of the EFL Cup. On 10 October, Palmer signed a new contract with Chelsea until 2034. On 25 October, Palmer received his first red card of his senior club career, in the 0–2 home defeat against Tottenham Hotspur, having received two yellow cards in the match.

== International career ==
Palmer represented the England national under-17 team at the 2019 UEFA European Under-17 Championship.

On 27 August 2021, Palmer received his first call-up for the England under-21s. He scored a goal on his debut in a 2–0 win over Kosovo in 2023 UEFA European Under-21 Championship qualification. He was later included in the England squad for the 2023 UEFA European Under-21 Championship, starting in the final as the Young Lions went on to win the tournament.

On 13 November 2023, Palmer received his first call-up to the senior England national team ahead of their UEFA Euro 2024 qualifying matches against Malta and North Macedonia. He made his debut on 17 November, coming on as a 61st-minute substitute in England's 2–0 victory against Malta at Wembley Stadium.

In May 2024, Palmer was named in England's 33-man preliminary squad for UEFA Euro 2024. On 3 June, he made his first England start and scored his first senior international goal in a pre-tournament friendly against Bosnia and Herzegovina. Three days later, Palmer was named in coach Gareth Southgate's the final 26-man squad for the tournament. He made his tournament debut as a substitute in England's final Group C match against Slovenia and also came off the bench in the 2–1 extra time round of 16 win over Slovakia. In the quarter-final against Switzerland, Palmer entered in the 78th minute and converted England's first penalty in their 5–3 shootout victory. On 10 July, Palmer came on in the 81st minute and assisted fellow substitute Ollie Watkins' 90th minute winner in the semi-final against the Netherlands. Four days later, Palmer came off the bench in the 70th minute of the final against Spain and scored England's equaliser from outside the box three minutes later. Spain ultimately won the match 2–1. Palmer was later named as the England Men's Player of the Year for the 2023–24 season.

Amid a drop in club form, Palmer was selected for coach Thomas Tuchel's squad for England's March 2026 friendlies against Uruguay and Japan. In May 2026, however, Palmer was omitted from England's final squad for the 2026 FIFA World Cup. He was called up for UEFA Nations League matches in the September–October window, but withdrew as a result of a muscular injury. This prompted a response from Tuchel, who labelled Palmer's exit as a "missed opportunity" and that Palmer "misses too many camps with injuries".

== Player profile ==
=== Style of play ===
A playmaker, Palmer predominantly plays centrally as an attacking midfielder, although he is also capable of operating as a winger on both flanks. Citing Wayne Rooney as inspiration, Palmer says he enjoys "street football style, playing freely and creatively". He is known for passing, ball-carrying, vision, and attacking intelligence. He frequently cuts inside the opposition's defensive line to shoot or create chances for teammates. Although predominantly left-footed, he is also adept with his right foot. Between 2024 and 2025, he was frequently praised by media sources as one of the best players in world football, as well as for his ability to perform in high-pressure matches, earning the description of a "big game player". Palmer himself has said that he enjoys playing in tournament finals.

=== Reception ===
Former Bristol City and Sunderland manager Lee Johnson described Palmer as "a matador showing his shoulder", and praised his technical ability. Palmer's composure on the pitch, particularly when taking penalties, has also been lauded, earning him the nickname "Cold Palmer". He responded to this by celebrating goals with his arms crossed and his hands rubbing his shoulders, a gesture he has attributed to his former Manchester City teammate, and current Chelsea teammate, Morgan Rogers.

== Outside football ==
Palmer has endorsement deals with Nike, Burberry, Beats by Dre, Toshiba, and Coca-Cola. In November 2024, he applied to the Intellectual Property Office to trademark the term "Cold Palmer"; the trademark was registered the following October. Palmer is an ambassador for the EA Sports' EA Sports FC video game series and appeared in gameplay reveal advertisements for FC 25, FC 26, and FC 27. In June 2026, Palmer and Chelsea teammate João Pedro appeared in American pop singer Madonna's promotional short film Confessions II, during the "Danceteria" segment.

== Personal life ==
Palmer is of Afro-Kittitian descent on his father's side of the family. His great-grandparents were part of the Windrush generation and migrated to the United Kingdom in 1955, while his grandfather followed in 1960. Palmer wears boots emblazoned with the flags of England and Saint Kitts and Nevis.

== Career statistics ==
=== Club ===
As of match played 21 November 2026

Appearances and goals by club, season and competition
Club	Season	League			FA Cup		EFL Cup		Europe		Other		Total	
Club	Season	Division	Apps	Goals	Apps	Goals	Apps	Goals	Apps	Goals	Apps	Goals	Apps	Goals
Manchester City U21	2019–20	—			—		—		—		2 (Note: Appearance(s) in EFL Trophy)	0	2	0
Manchester City U21	2021–22	—			—		—		—		1	1	1	1
Manchester City U21	Total	—			—		—		—		3	1	3	1
Manchester City	2020–21	Premier League	0	0	0	0	1	0	1 (Note: Appearance(s) in UEFA Champions League)	0	—		2	0
Manchester City	2021–22	Premier League	4	0	1	1	2	1	3	1	1 (Note: Appearance in FA Community Shield)	0	11	3
Manchester City	2022–23	Premier League	14	0	4	1	3	0	4	0	0	0	25	1
Manchester City	2023–24	Premier League	1	0	—		—		—		2 (Note: One appearance and one goal in FA Community Shield, one appearance and one goal in UEFA Super Cup)	2	3	2
Manchester City	Total		19	0	5	2	6	1	8	1	3	2	41	6
Chelsea	2023–24	Premier League	33	22	6	1	6	2	—		—		45	25
Chelsea	2024–25	Premier League	37	15	1	0	0	0	8 (Note: Appearances in UEFA Conference League)	0	6 (Note: Appearances in FIFA Club World Cup)	3	52	18
Chelsea	2025–26	Premier League	26	10	3	0	1	0	4	1	—		34	11
Chelsea	2026–27	Premier League	11	3	0	0	2	2	—		—		13	5
Chelsea	Total		107	50	10	1	9	4	12	1	6	3	144	59
Career total			126	50	15	3	14	5	20	2	12	6	187	66

=== International ===
As of match played 31 March 2026

Appearances and goals by national team and year
National team	Year	Apps	Goals
England	2023	2	0
England	2024	9	2
England	2025	1	0
England	2026	2	0
Total		14	2

As of match played 31 March 2026
England score listed first, score column indicates score after each Palmer goal

List of international goals scored by Cole Palmer
No.	Date	Venue	Cap	Opponent	Score	Result	Competition	Ref.
1	3 June 2024	St James' Park, Newcastle upon Tyne, England	3	Bosnia and Herzegovina	1–0	3–0	Friendly	
2	14 July 2024	Olympiastadion, Berlin, Germany	9	Spain	1–1	1–2	UEFA Euro 2024	

== Honours ==
Manchester City

- Premier League: 2022–23
- FA Cup: 2022–23
- UEFA Champions League: 2022–23
- UEFA Super Cup: 2023

Chelsea

- UEFA Conference League: 2024–25
- FIFA Club World Cup: 2025
- FA Cup runner-up: 2025–26
- EFL Cup runner-up: 2023–24

England U21

- UEFA European Under-21 Championship: 2023

England

- UEFA European Championship runner-up: 2024

Individual

- England's Men's Player of the Year: 2023–24
- Premier League Fan Team of the Season: 2023–24
- London Football Awards Men's Young Player of the Year: 2024
- London Football Awards Premier League Player of the Year: 2025
- London Football Awards Goal of the season: 2025
- Chelsea Player of the Season: 2023–24
- Chelsea Player's Player of the Season: 2023–24
- Premier League Player of the Month: April 2024, September 2024
- Premier League Goal of the Month: April 2024, August 2024
- Premier League Young Player of the Season: 2023–24
- PFA Fans' Player of the Year: 2023–24
- PFA Young Player of the Year: 2023–24
- The Athletic Premier League Insiders Signing of the Season: 2023–24
- The Athletic Premier League Young Player of the Season: 2023–24
- The Athletic Premier League Team of the Season: 2023–24
- Premier League Game Changer of the Season: 2023–24
- Fantasy Premier League Team of the Season: 2023–24
- UEFA Conference League Team of the Season: 2024–25
- EA Sports FC Premier League Team of the Season: 2024–25
- ESM Team of the Season: 2024–25
- FIFA Club World Cup Golden Ball: 2025
- FIFA Club World Cup Team of the Tournament: 2025
- FIFPRO Men's World 11: 2025
- FIFA Men's World 11: 2025
