= Manager of the Year =

Manager of the Year may refer to:

- Major League Baseball Manager of the Year Award
- League Managers Association Manager of the Year
- Premier League Manager of the Season
