= PFA Fans' Player of the Year =

Football award in England

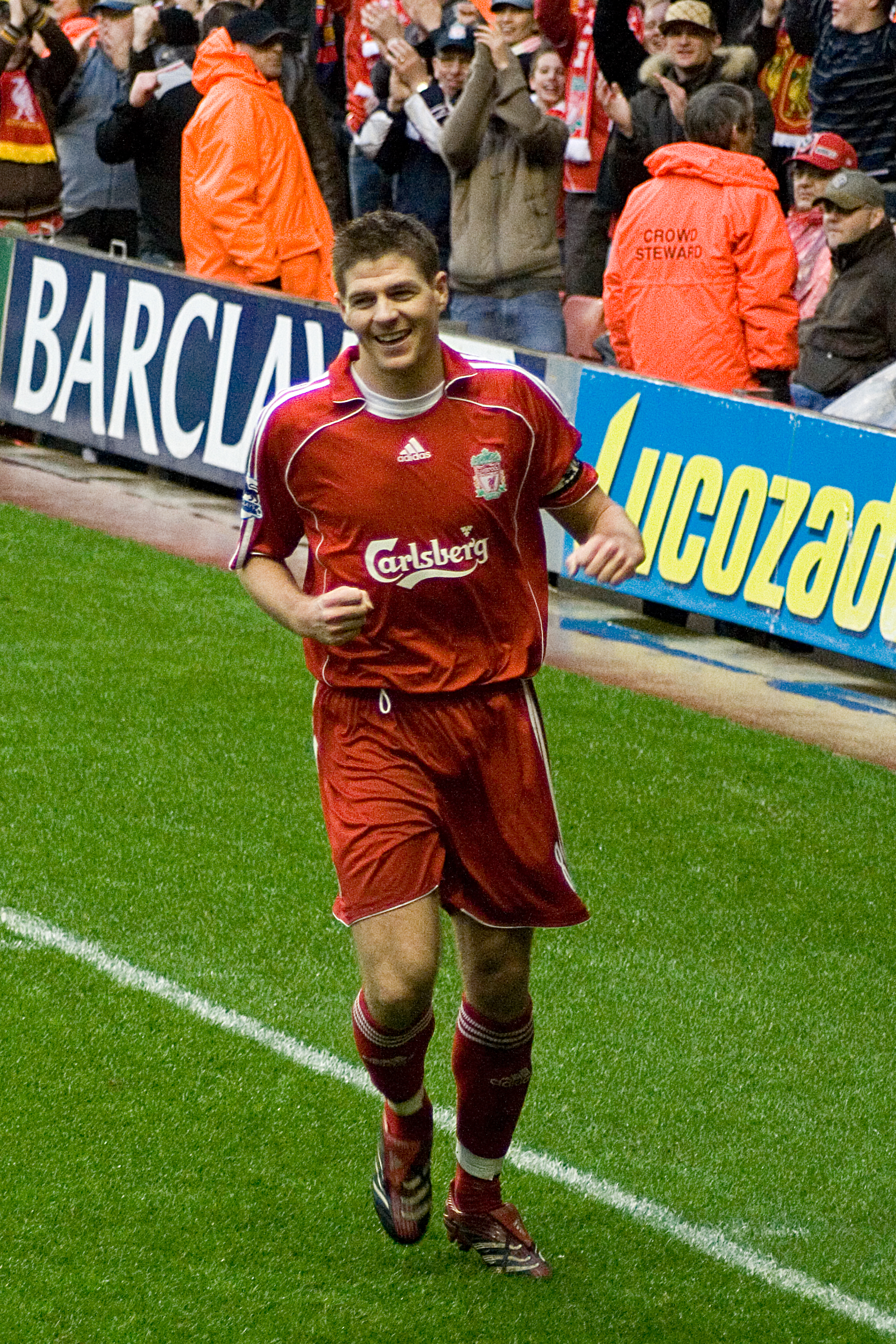
Steven Gerrard of Liverpool was the inaugural winner of this award in 2001

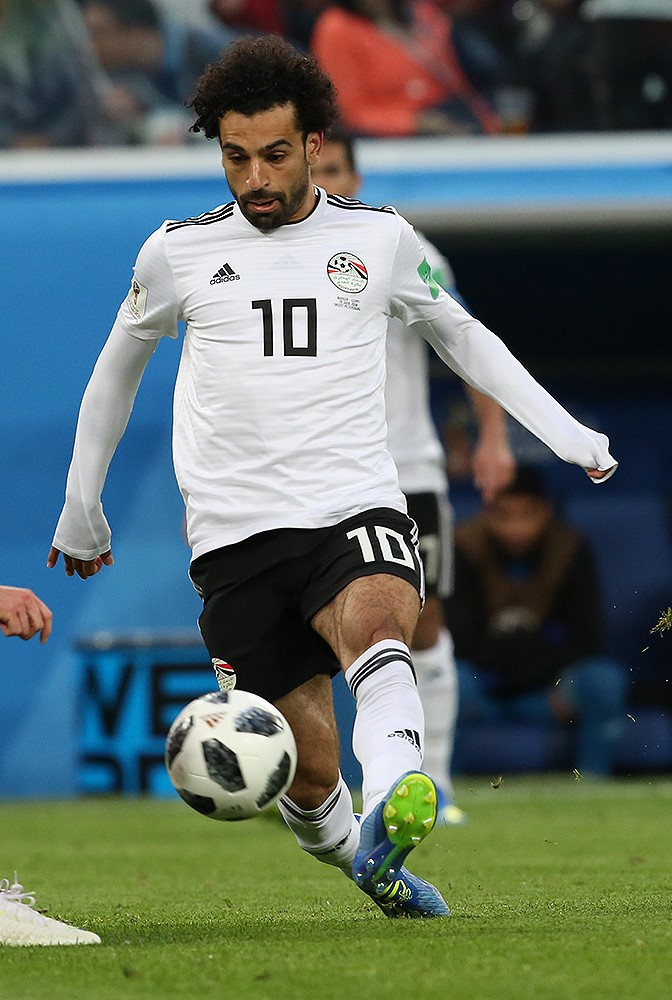
Mohamed Salah is the record holder for winning the award 3 times.

The Professional Footballers' Association Fans' Player of the Year (often called the PFA Fans' Player of the Year, or simply the Fans' Player of the Year) award is given to footballers in the top four flights of English football, the Premier League, the Championship, League One and League Two.

The shortlist is compiled by the members of the Professional Footballers' Association (the PFA), and then the winner is voted for by the fans of the league.

The award was first given in 2001, and was won by Steven Gerrard, Chris Bart-Williams, Brian Tinnion and Bobby Zamora, of Liverpool, Nottingham Forest, Bristol City and Brighton & Hove Albion respectively. Mohamed Salah is the record holder for winning the award 3 times. Cole Palmer is the current Premier League award winner.

== List of winners ==
Highlighted players won the award for a second or third time.

=== 2001 ===
League	Player	Club	Notes
FA Premiership	(England) Steven Gerrard	Liverpool	First winner of the award in the FA Premiership; Winning the award in addition to the Young Player of the Year award
First Division	(England) Chris Bart-Williams	Nottingham Forest	First winner of the award in the First Division
Second Division	(England) Brian Tinnion	Bristol City	First winner of the award in the Second Division
Third Division	(England) Bobby Zamora	Brighton & Hove Albion	First winner of the award in the Third Division

=== 2002 ===
League	Player	Club	Notes
FA Premiership	(Netherlands) Ruud van Nistelrooy	Manchester United	First winner of the award from outside of England; First winner of the award from outside of Great Britain; First winner of the award from outside of the United Kingdom; First winner of the award from outside of the British Isles; Winning the award in addition to the Players' Player of the Year award
First Division	(England) Dean Sturridge	Wolverhampton Wanderers	
Second Division	(England) Bobby Zamora	Brighton & Hove Albion	First two-time winner of the award First two-time winner of the award in two different leagues
Third Division	(England) Matthew Taylor	Luton Town	

=== 2003 ===
League	Player	Club	Notes
FA Premiership	(France) Thierry Henry	Arsenal	Winning the award in addition to the Players' Player of the Year award Winning the award in addition to the FWA Footballer of the Year award
First Division	(England) Linvoy Primus	Portsmouth	
Second Division	(Wales) Robert Earnshaw	Cardiff City	
Third Division	(England) Leon Britton	Swansea City	

=== 2004 ===
League	Player	Club	Notes
FA Premiership	(France) Thierry Henry (2)	Arsenal	First winner of the award in two consecutive seasons First player to win three awards in two consecutive seasons Winning the award in addition to the Players' Player of the Year award Winning the award in addition to the FWA Footballer of the Year award Winning the award in addition to the Premier League Player of the Season award
First Division	(England) Darren Huckerby	Norwich City	
Second Division	(England) Neil Moss	Bournemouth	
Third Division	(England) Lee Harper	Northampton Town	

=== 2005 ===
League	Player	Club	Notes
FA Premier League	(England) Frank Lampard	Chelsea	Winning the award in addition to the FWA Footballer of the Year award Winning the award in addition to the Premier League Player of the Season award
Championship	(England) Paul McKenna	Preston North End	
League One	(England) Keith Southern	Blackpool	
League Two	(England) Adam Barrett	Southend United	

=== 2006 ===
League	Player	Club	Notes
FA Premier League	(England) Wayne Rooney	Manchester United	Winning the award in addition to the Young Player of the Year award
Championship	(Republic of Ireland) Kevin Doyle	Reading	
League One	(England) Darryl Flahavan	Southend United	
League Two	(England) Karl Hawley	Carlisle United	

=== 2007 ===
League	Player	Club	Notes
Premier League	(Portugal) Cristiano Ronaldo	Manchester United	First player to win all five main awards in the same year First player to win all three PFA awards in the same year Winning the award in addition to the Players' Player of the Year award Winning the award in addition to the FWA Footballer of the Year award Winning the award in addition to the Young Player of the Year award Winning the award in addition to the Premier League Player of the Season award
Championship	(England) Matthew Murray	Wolverhampton Wanderers	
League One	(England) Billy Sharp	Scunthorpe United	
League Two	(Scotland) Lee Peacock	Swindon Town	

=== 2008 ===
League	Player	Club	Notes
Premier League	(Portugal) Cristiano Ronaldo (2)	Manchester United	First player to win four awards in two consecutive seasons Winning the award in addition to the Players' Player of the Year award Winning the award in addition to the FWA Footballer of the Year award Winning the award in addition to the Premier League Player of the Season award
Championship	(England) James Beattie	Sheffield United	
League One	(England) Jay Simpson	Millwall (on loan from Arsenal)	'First winner of award whilst on loan at another club
League Two	(England) Jack Lester	Chesterfield	

=== 2009 ===
League	Player	Club	Notes
Premier League	(England) Steven Gerrard (2)	Liverpool	Winning the award in addition to the FWA Footballer of the Year award
Championship	(England) Marcus Tudgay	Sheffield Wednesday	
League One	(England) Jermaine Beckford	Leeds United	
League Two	(Scotland) Jordan Rhodes	Brentford (On loan from Ipswich Town)	

=== 2010 ===
League	Player	Club	Notes
Premier League	(England) Wayne Rooney (2)	Manchester United	Winning the award in addition to the Players' Player of the Year award Winning the award in addition to the FWA Footballer of the Year award Winning the award in addition to the Premier League Player of the Season award
Championship	(Scotland) Graham Dorrans	West Bromwich Albion	
League One	(England) Rickie Lambert	Southampton	
League Two	(Denmark) Kasper Schmeichel	Notts County	

=== 2011 ===
League	Player	Club	Notes
Premier League	(Portugal) Raul Meireles	Liverpool	
Championship	(England) Danny Graham	Watford	
League One	(England) Peter Clarke	Huddersfield Town	
League Two	(England) Cody McDonald	Gillingham	

=== 2012 ===
League	Player	Club	Notes
Premier League	(Netherlands) Robin van Persie	Arsenal	Winning the award in addition to the Players' Player of the Year award Winning the award in addition to the FWA Footballer of the Year award
Championship	(England) Jay Rodriguez	Burnley	
League One	(Portugal) José Semedo	Sheffield Wednesday	
League Two	(England) Lewis Grabban	Rotherham United	

=== 2013 ===
- Not awarded

=== 2014 ===
League	Player	Club	Notes
Premier League	(Uruguay) Luis Suárez	Liverpool	Winning the award in addition to the Players' Player of the Year award Winning the award in addition to the FWA Footballer of the Year award Winning the award in addition to the Premier League Player of the Season award
Championship	(England) Danny Ings	Burnley	
League One	(England) Harry Maguire	Sheffield United	
League Two	(England) Tommy Lee	Chesterfield	

=== 2015 ===
League	Player	Club	Notes
Premier League	(Chile) Alexis Sánchez	Arsenal	
Championship	(Republic of Ireland) Harry Arter	Bournemouth	
League One	(England) Joe Garner	Preston North End	
League Two	(England) Matt Tubbs	Portsmouth	

=== 2016 ===
League	Player	Club	Notes
Premier League	(Algeria) Riyad Mahrez	Leicester City	Winning the award in addition to the Players' Player of the Year award
Championship	(Spain) Daniel Ayala	Middlesbrough	
League One	(Northern Ireland) Will Grigg	Wigan Athletic	
League Two	(Republic of Ireland) Graham Carey	Plymouth Argyle	

=== 2017 ===
League	Player	Club	Notes
Premier League	(England) Harry Kane	Tottenham Hotspur	
Championship	(England) Dwight Gayle	Newcastle United	
League One	(England) David Wheater	Bolton Wanderers	
League Two	(Republic of Ireland) Enda Stevens	Portsmouth	

=== 2018 ===
League	Player	Club	Notes
Premier League	(Egypt) Mohamed Salah	Liverpool	Winning the award in addition to the Players' Player of the Year award Winning the award in addition to the FWA Footballer of the Year award Winning the award in addition to the FSA Player of the Year award Winning the award in addition to the Premier League Player of the Season award
Championship	(England) Ryan Sessegnon	Fulham	
League One	(England) Bradley Dack	Blackburn Rovers	
League Two	(Scotland) Marc McNulty	Coventry City	

=== 2019 ===
League	Player	Club	Notes
Premier League	(Belgium) Eden Hazard	Chelsea	
Championship	(Finland) Teemu Pukki	Norwich City	
League One	(Montserrat) Lyle Taylor	Charlton Athletic	
League Two	(England) Michael Bostwick	Lincoln City	

=== 2020 ===
League	Player	Club	Notes
Premier League	(Senegal) Sadio Mané	Liverpool	
Championship	(England) Luke Ayling	Leeds United	
League One	(Wales) Joe Jacobson	Wycombe Wanderers	
League Two	(England) Alex Palmer	Plymouth Argyle	

=== 2021 ===
League	Player	Club	Notes
Premier League	(Egypt) Mohamed Salah (2)	Liverpool	Winning the award in addition to the FSA Player of the Year award
Championship	(England) Adam Armstrong	Blackburn Rovers	
League One	(England) Jerry Yates	Blackpool	
League Two	(England) Tom Conlon	Port Vale	

=== 2022 ===
League	Player	Club	Notes
Premier League	(Egypt) Mohamed Salah (3)	Liverpool	Winning the award in addition to the Players' Player of the Year award Winning the award in addition to the FWA Footballer of the Year award
Championship	(Serbia) Aleksandar Mitrović	Fulham	
League One	(Scotland) Ross Stewart	Sunderland	
League Two	(Jamaica) Jamille Matt	Forest Green Rovers	

=== 2023 ===
League	Player	Club	Notes
Premier League	(England) Marcus Rashford	Manchester United	
Championship	(Ivory Coast) Amad Diallo	Sunderland	
League One	(Republic of Ireland) David McGoldrick	Derby County	
League Two	(Scotland) Elliot Watt	Salford City	

=== 2024 ===
League	Player	Club	Notes
Premier League	(England) Cole Palmer	Chelsea	
Championship	(Egypt) Sam Morsy	Ipswich Town	
League One	(Guatemala) Nathaniel Mendez-Laing	Derby County	
League Two	(England) Paul Mullin	Wrexham	

== Breakdown of winners ==
=== Winners by club ===
- Information correct up to and including 2024.

Club	Premier League	Championship/First Division	League One/Second Division	League Two/Third Division
Liverpool	8 (2001, 2009, 2011, 2014, 2018, 2020, 2021, 2022)	0	0	0
Manchester United	7 (2002, 2006, 2007, 2008, 2010, 2023)	0	0	0
Arsenal	4 (2003, 2004, 2012, 2015)	0	0	0
Chelsea	3 (2005, 2019, 2024)	0	0	0
Leicester City	1 (2016)	0	0	0
Tottenham Hotspur	1 (2017)	0	0	0
Wolverhampton Wanderers	0	2 (2002, 2007)	0	0
Norwich City	0	2 (2004, 2019)	0	0
Burnley	0	2 (2012, 2014)	0	0
Fulham	0	2 (2018, 2022)	0	0
Preston North End	0	1 (2005)	1 (2015)	0
Sheffield United	0	1 (2008)	1 (2014)	0
Sheffield Wednesday	0	1 (2009)	1 (2012)	0
Bournemouth	0	1 (2015)	1 (2004)	0
Leeds United	0	1 (2020)	1 (2009)	0
Blackburn Rovers	0	1 (2021)	1 (2018)	0
Sunderland	0	1 (2023)	1 (2022)	0
Portsmouth	0	1 (2003)	0	2 (2015, 2017)
Nottingham Forest	0	1 (2001)	0	0
Reading	0	1 (2006)	0	0
West Bromwich Albion	0	1 (2010)	0	0
Watford	0	1 (2011)	0	0
Middlesbrough	0	1 (2016)	0	0
Newcastle United	0	1 (2017)	0	0
Ipswich Town	0	1 (2024)	0	0
Blackpool	0	0	2 (2005, 2021)	0
Brighton & Hove Albion	0	0	1 (2002)	1 (2001)
Southend United	0	0	1 (2006)	1 (2005)
Bristol City	0	0	1 (2001)	0
Cardiff City	0	0	1 (2003)	0
Scunthorpe United	0	0	1 (2007)	0
Millwall	0	0	1 (2008)	0
Southampton	0	0	1 (2010)	0
Huddersfield Town	0	0	1 (2011)	0
Wigan Athletic	0	0	1 (2016)	0
Bolton Wanderers	0	0	1 (2017)	0
Charlton Athletic	0	0	1 (2019)	0
Wycombe Wanderers	0	0	1 (2020)	0
Derby County	0	0	2 (2023, 2024)	0
Chesterfield	0	0	0	2 (2008, 2014)
Plymouth Argyle	0	0	0	2 (2016, 2020)
Luton Town	0	0	0	1 (2002)
Swansea City	0	0	0	1 (2003)
Northampton Town	0	0	0	1 (2004)
Carlisle United	0	0	0	1 (2006)
Swindon Town	0	0	0	1 (2007)
Brentford	0	0	0	1 (2009)
Notts County	0	0	0	1 (2010)
Gillingham	0	0	0	1 (2011)
Rotherham United	0	0	0	1 (2012)
Coventry City	0	0	0	1 (2018)
Lincoln City	0	0	0	1 (2019)
Port Vale	0	0	0	1 (2021)
Forest Green Rovers	0	0	0	1 (2022)
Salford City	0	0	0	1 (2023)
Wrexham	0	0	0	1 (2024)
Total	22	22	22	22

=== Winners by country ===
- Information correct up to and including 2023.

Country	Premier League	Championship/First Division	League One/Second Division	League Two/Third Division
England	8 (2001, 2005, 2006, 2009, 2010, 2017, 2023, 2024)	15 (2001, 2002, 2003, 2004, 2005, 2007, 2008, 2009, 2011, 2012, 2014, 2017, 2018, 2020, 2021)	15 (2001, 2002, 2004, 2005, 2006, 2007, 2008, 2009, 2010, 2011, 2014, 2015, 2017, 2018, 2021)	15 (2001, 2002, 2003, 2004, 2005, 2006, 2008, 2011, 2012, 2014, 2015, 2019, 2020, 2021, 2024)
Portugal	3 (2007, 2008, 2011)	0	1 (2012)	0
Egypt	3 (2018, 2021, 2022)	1 (2024)	0	0
France	2 (2003, 2004)	0	0	0
Netherlands	2 (2002, 2012)	0	0	0
Uruguay	1 (2014)	0	0	0
Chile	1 (2015)	0	0	0
Algeria	1 (2016)	0	0	0
Belgium	1 (2019)	0	0	0
Senegal	1 (2020)	0	0	0
Republic of Ireland	0	2 (2006, 2015)	1 (2023)	2 (2016, 2017)
Scotland	0	1 (2010)	1 (2022)	4 (2007, 2009, 2018, 2023)
Spain	0	1 (2016)	0	0
Finland	0	1 (2019)	0	0
Serbia	0	1 (2022)	0	0
Ivory Coast	0	1 (2023)	0	0
Wales	0	0	2 (2003, 2020)	0
Northern Ireland	0	0	1 (2016)	0
Montserrat	0	0	1 (2019)	0
Guatemala	0	0	1 (2024)	0
Denmark	0	0	0	1 (2010)
Jamaica	0	0	0	1 (2022)
Total	23	23	23	23
