= Premier League Most Powerful Goal =

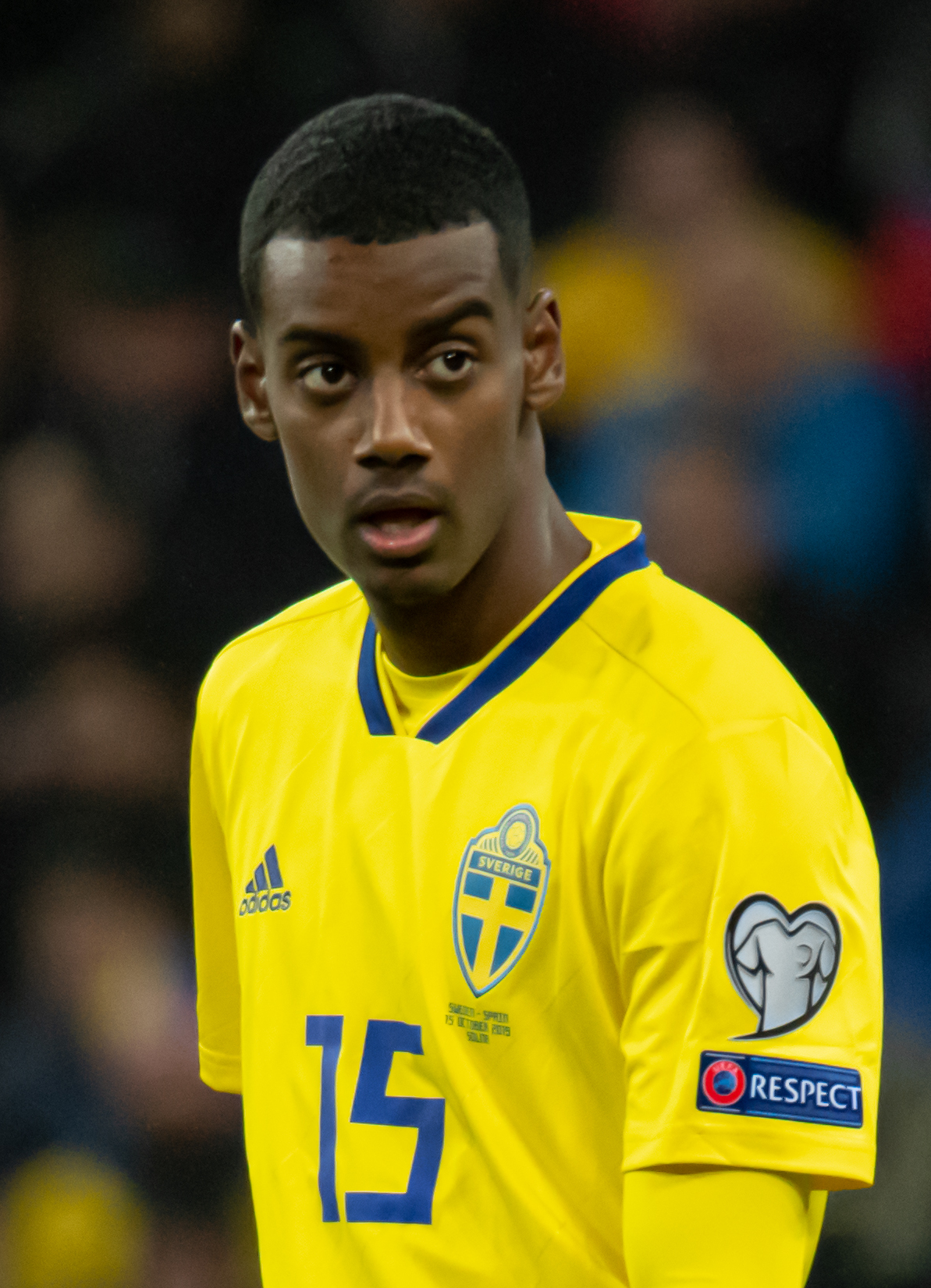
- Alexander Isak is the current holder of the award.
- Awarded for: The most powerful goal scored in a Premier League season.
- Sponsored by: Oracle
- Country: England
- Presented by: Premier League
- First award: 2022
- Currently held by: Alexander Isak

Highlights
- Most powerful goal: Fernandinho (for Manchester City vs. Leeds United, 30 April 2022, 117.6km/h)

The Premier League Most Powerful Goal is an annual English football award, presented to the player who has scored the most powerfully struck goal in a Premier League season. The speed of every goal is calculated by Opta Sports for the purpose of the award. For sponsorship purposes, it has been called the Oracle Most Powerful Goal since its inception at the end of the 2021–22 Premier League season.

The most powerful goal recorded was scored by Fernandinho in a 4–0 victory for Manchester City over Leeds United on 30 April 2022, calculated to be travelling at 117.6km/h. The latest award winner is Liverpool F.C. forward Alexander Isak.

== Winners ==
Key
**Bold**	Player still active in the Premier League
†	Indicates most powerful goal recorded
‡	Indicates player who also won the Premier League Golden Boot award in the same season
§	Denotes the club were Premier League champions in the same season
Italics	Home team

Season	Player	Nationality	Team	Score (Note: The score at the time of the goal. Player's team's score listed first.)	Opponent	Speed	Date	Ref.
2021–22	Fernandinho	Brazil	Manchester City§	**4**–0	Leeds United	117.6 km/h (73.1 mph) †	30 April 2022	
2022–23	Saïd Benrahma	Algeria	West Ham United	**1**–0	Crystal Palace	107.17 km/h (66.59 mph)	6 November 2022	
2023–24	Moussa Diaby	France	Aston Villa	**2**–0	Wolverhampton Wanderers	109.84 km/h (68.25 mph)	30 March 2024	
2024–25	**Alexander Isak**	Sweden	Newcastle United	**1**–0	Liverpool	108.94 km/h (67.69 mph)	4 December 2024	

== Awards won by nationality ==
Country	Players	Total
Algeria	1	1
Brazil	1	1
France	1	1
Sweden	1	1

== Awards won by club ==
Club	Players	Total
Aston Villa	1	1
Manchester City	1	1
Newcastle United	1	1
West Ham United	1	1

== See also ==
- Premier League Player of the Season
- Premier League Young Player of the Season
- Premier League Playmaker of the Season
- Premier League Manager of the Season
- Premier League Goal of the Season
- Premier League Save of the Season
- Premier League Game Changer of the Season
- Premier League Golden Boot
- Premier League Golden Glove
