= Premier League Young Player of the Season =

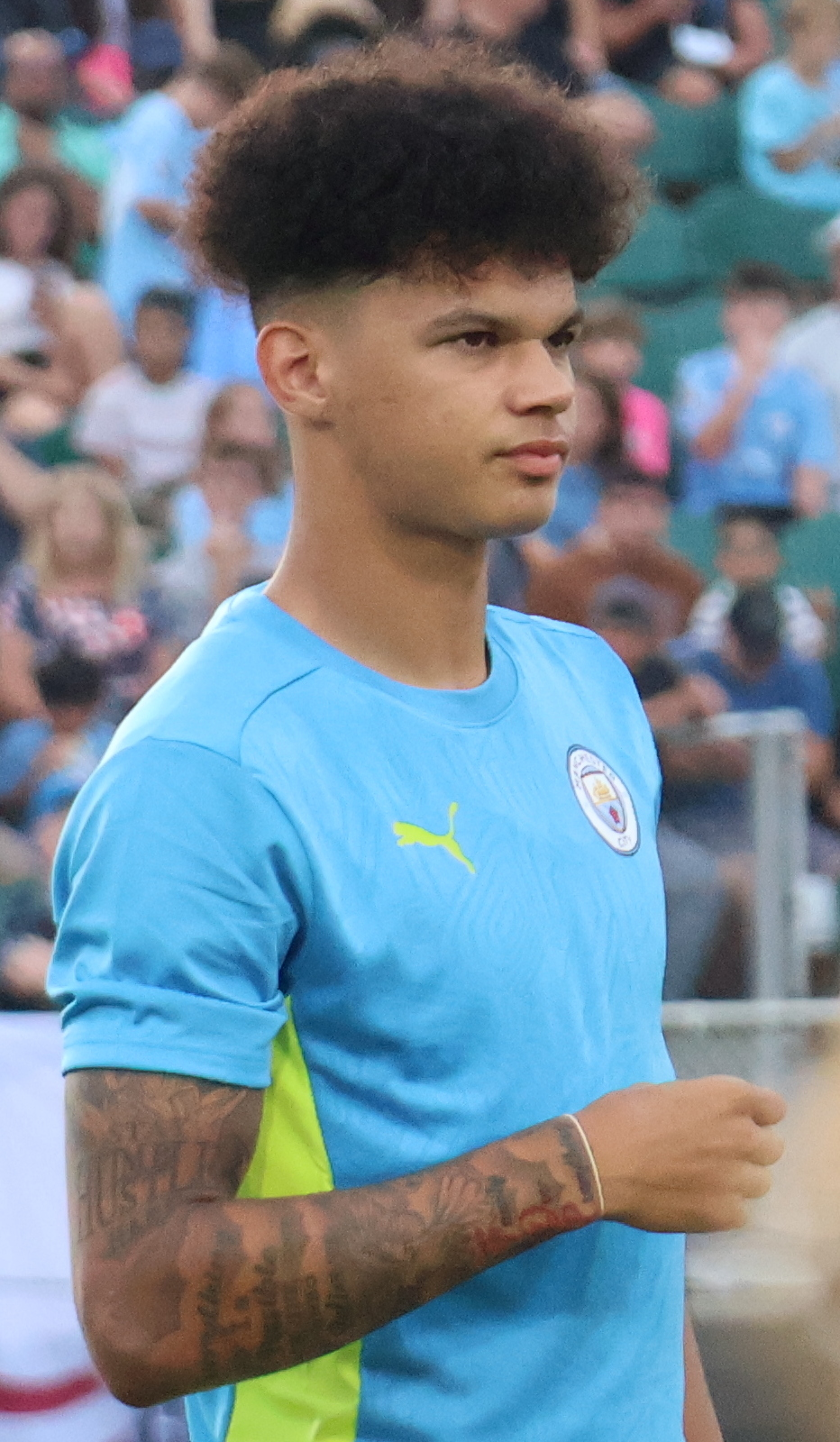
- Nico O'Reilly is the current holder of the award.
- Awarded for: The most outstanding player aged 23 or younger in each given Premier League season
- Sponsored by: Hublot
- Country: England
- Presented by: Premier League
- First award: 2020
- Currently held by: Nico O'Reilly

Highlights
- Most awards: Phil Foden (2)
- Most consecutive wins: Phil Foden (2)
- Most team wins: Manchester City (4)

The Premier League Young Player of the Season is an annual English football award, presented to the best player aged 23 or younger in the Premier League. For sponsorship purposes, it is known as the Hublot Young Player of the Season since the 2020–21 season, after being known as TAG Heuer Young Player of the Season right after its inception during the 2019–20 season.

Trent Alexander-Arnold of Liverpool was the first winner of the award. Manchester City player Phil Foden has won the most awards with two. In 2024, Chelsea midfielder Cole Palmer became the first player to receive the award while not winning the league. The current holder of the award is Manchester City full-back Nico O'Reilly.

== Winners ==
Key
Player (X)	Name of the player and number of times they had won the award at that point (if more than one)
†	Indicates multiple award winners in the same season
‡	Denotes the club were Premier League champions in the same season
#	Indicates player won also Premier League Player of the Season award in the same campaign

Premier League Young Player of the Season winners
Season	Player	Nationality	Club	Ref(s)
2019–20	Trent Alexander-Arnold	England	Liverpool^{‡}	
2020–21	Phil Foden (1)	England	Manchester City^{‡}	
2021–22	Phil Foden (2)	England	Manchester City^{‡}	
2022–23	Erling Haaland^{#}	Norway	Manchester City^{‡}	
2023–24	Cole Palmer	England	Chelsea	
2024–25	Ryan Gravenberch	Netherlands	Liverpool^{‡}	
2025–26	Nico O'Reilly	England	Manchester City	

== Multiple awards won by players ==
The following table lists the number of awards won by players who have won at least two Young Player of the Season awards.

Players in bold are still active in the Premier League.

Awards	Player	Nationality	Seasons
2	**Phil Foden**	England	2020–21, 2021–22

== Awards won by nationality ==
Country	Players	Total
England	4	5
Netherlands	1	1
Norway	1	1

== Awards won by club ==
Club	Players	Total
Manchester City	3	4
Liverpool	2	2
Chelsea	1	1

== See also ==
- PFA Young Player of the Year
- Premier League Player of the Season
- Premier League Playmaker of the Season
- Premier League Manager of the Season
- Premier League Goal of the Season
- Premier League Save of the Season
- Premier League Game Changer of the Season
- Premier League Most Powerful Goal
