= Premier League Goal of the Month =

English Football award

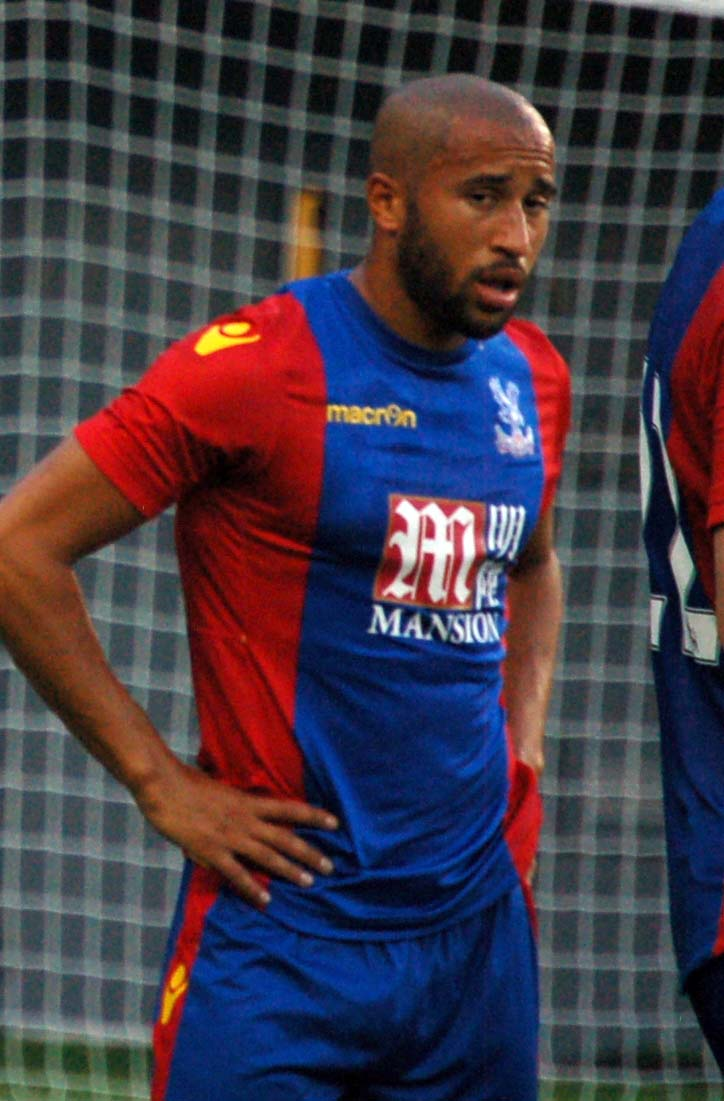
Andros Townsend is the first player to have won the award three times, and the first to have won with different clubs.

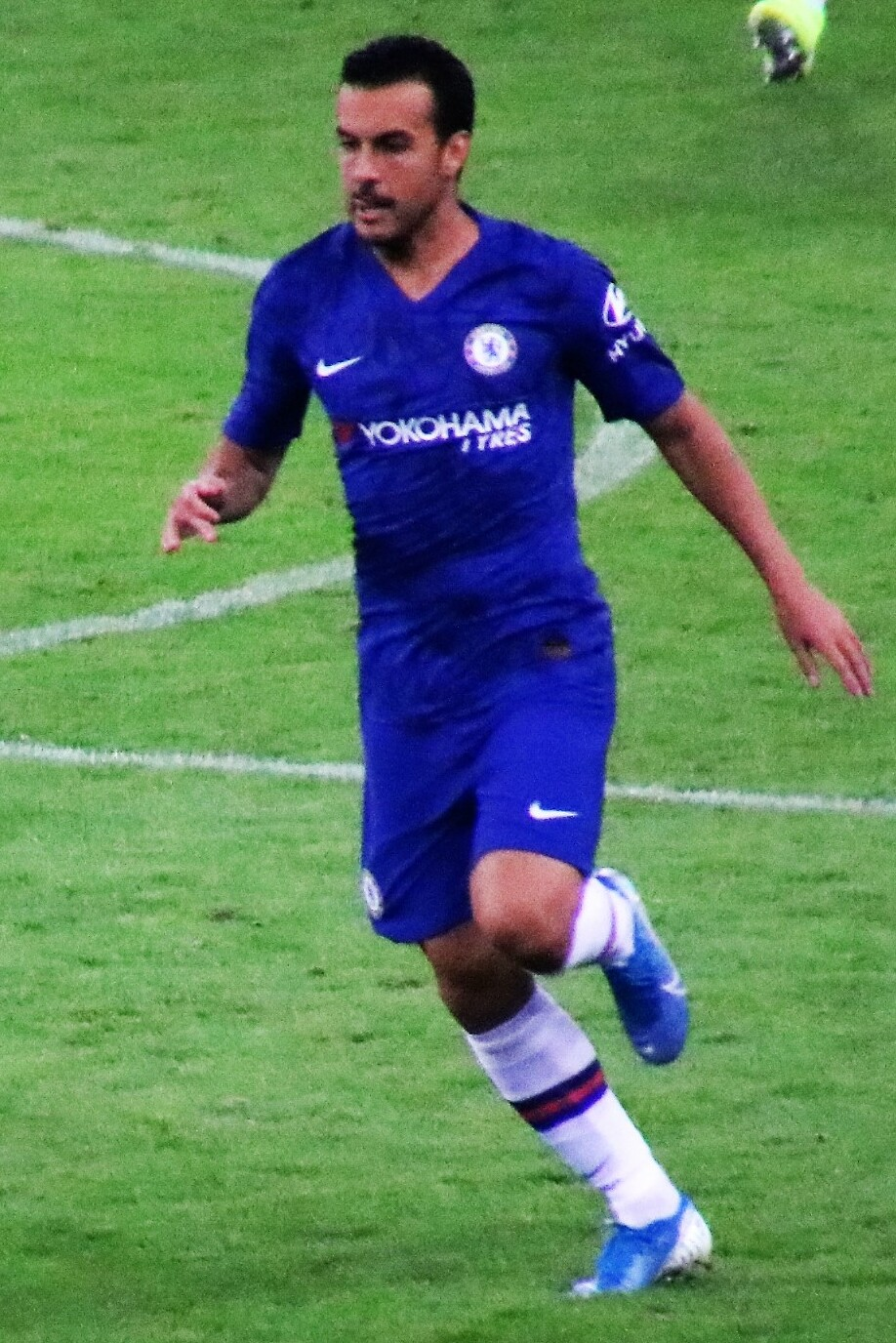
Pedro is the first player to have won the award multiple times in the same season.

The Premier League Goal of the Month is an association football award that recognises the player who is deemed to have scored the best Premier League goal each month of the season from August to April. The winner is chosen by a combination of an online public vote, which contributes to 10% of the final tally, and a panel of experts.

At the end of the season, the nine monthly winners are put forward for the Premier League Goal of the Season, which is chosen using the same method, although the 2016–17 award featured, and indeed was won by, a goal from May which did not go to a vote.

The award was introduced for the 2016–17 season as the Budweiser Goal of the Month by its sponsored name for eight seasons; since the 2024–25 season it has been known as the Guinness Goal of the Month.

The first recipient of the award was Middlesbrough striker Cristhian Stuani for his away goal against Sunderland. Pedro was the first player to have won the award multiple times, while Andros Townsend was the first player to have won it three times, and the first to achieve it with different clubs, having won the award while playing for Crystal Palace and Everton. Thanks to Miguel Almirón (April 2022) and Allan Saint-Maximin (August 2022), Newcastle United became first club to have consecutive winners, while Wolverhampton Wanderers was the first to do it in the same season, with Jonny and Matheus Nunes winning March and April 2023 awards respectively. In the 2023–24 season, Manchester United became the first club to win four Goal of the Month awards in a single season, all scored by different players. Winning in April 2024 and August 2024, Cole Palmer became the first player to win the award consecutively across two seasons.

As of October 2026, the latest recipient of the award is Brighton & Hove Albion player Diego Gómez.

== Winners ==
Key
Player (X)	Name of the player and number of times they had won the award at that point (if more than one)
Italics	Home team

Month	Year	Nationality	Player	Team	Score	Opponents	Date	Ref.
2016–17 Premier League
August	2016	Uruguay	Cristhian Stuani	Middlesbrough	1–0	Sunderland	21 August 2016	
September	2016	England	Jordan Henderson	Liverpool	2–0	Chelsea	16 September 2016	
October	2016	France	Dimitri Payet	West Ham United	1–1	Middlesbrough	1 October 2016	
November	2016	Spain	Pedro (1)	Chelsea	1–1	Tottenham Hotspur	26 November 2016	
December	2016	Armenia	Henrikh Mkhitaryan	Manchester United	3–0	Sunderland	26 December 2016	
January	2017	England	Andy Carroll	West Ham United	2–0	Crystal Palace	14 January 2017	
February	2017	Belgium	Eden Hazard (1)	Chelsea	2–0	Arsenal	4 February 2017	
March	2017	England	Andros Townsend (1)	Crystal Palace	2–0	West Bromwich Albion	4 March 2017	
April	2017	Spain	Pedro (2)	Chelsea	1–0	Everton	30 April 2017	
2017–18 Premier League
August	2017	England	Charlie Daniels	Bournemouth	1–0	Manchester City	26 August 2017	
September	2017	Ecuador	Antonio Valencia	Manchester United	1–0	Everton	17 September 2017	
October	2017	Morocco	Sofiane Boufal	Southampton	1–0	West Bromwich Albion	21 October 2017	
November	2017	England	Wayne Rooney	Everton	3–0	West Ham United	29 November 2017	
December	2017	England	Jermain Defoe	Bournemouth	2–2	Crystal Palace	9 December 2017	
January	2018	Brazil	Willian (1)	Chelsea	2–0	Brighton & Hove Albion	20 January 2018	
February	2018	Kenya	Victor Wanyama	Tottenham Hotspur	1–1	Liverpool	4 February 2018	
March	2018	England	Jamie Vardy	Leicester City	1–1	West Bromwich Albion	10 March 2018	
April	2018	Denmark	Christian Eriksen	Tottenham Hotspur	1–1	Chelsea	1 April 2018	
2018–19 Premier League
August	2018	Ivory Coast	Jean Michaël Seri	Fulham	1–0	Burnley	26 August 2018	
September	2018	England	Daniel Sturridge	Liverpool	1–1	Chelsea	29 September 2018	
October	2018	Wales	Aaron Ramsey	Arsenal	3–1	Fulham	7 October 2018	
November	2018	South Korea	Son Heung-min (1)	Tottenham Hotspur	3–0	Chelsea	24 November 2018	
December	2018	England	Andros Townsend (2)	Crystal Palace	2–1	Manchester City	22 December 2018	
January	2019	Germany	André Schürrle	Fulham	1–0	Burnley	12 January 2019	
February	2019	Switzerland	Fabian Schär	Newcastle United	1–0	Burnley	26 February 2019	
March	2019	France	Anthony Knockaert	Brighton & Hove Albion	2–1	Crystal Palace	9 March 2019	
April	2019	Belgium	Eden Hazard (2)	Chelsea	1–0	West Ham United	8 April 2019	
2019–20 Premier League
August	2019	England	Harvey Barnes	Leicester City	2–1	Sheffield United	24 August 2019	
September	2019	Mali	Moussa Djenepo	Southampton	1–0	Sheffield United	14 September 2019	
October	2019	England	Matty Longstaff	Newcastle United	1–0	Manchester United	6 October 2019	
November	2019	Belgium	Kevin De Bruyne (1)	Manchester City	2–1	Newcastle United	30 November 2019	
December	2019	South Korea	Son Heung-min (2)	Tottenham Hotspur	3–0	Burnley	7 December 2019	
January	2020	Iran	Alireza Jahanbakhsh	Brighton & Hove Albion	1–1	Chelsea	1 January 2020	
February	2020	Czech Republic	Matěj Vydra	Burnley	2–1	Southampton	15 February 2020	
June	2020	Portugal	Bruno Fernandes (1)	Manchester United	3–0	Brighton & Hove Albion	30 June 2020	
July	2020	Belgium	Kevin De Bruyne (2)	Manchester City	2–0	Norwich City	26 July 2020	
2020–21 Premier League
September	2020	England	James Maddison	Leicester City	4–1	Manchester City	27 September 2020	
October	2020	Argentina	Manuel Lanzini	West Ham United	3–3	Tottenham Hotspur	18 October 2020	
November	2020	Nigeria	Ola Aina	Fulham	2–0	West Bromwich Albion	2 November 2020	
December	2020	Ivory Coast	Sébastien Haller	West Ham United	1–1	Crystal Palace	16 December 2020	
January	2021	Egypt	Mohamed Salah (1)	Liverpool	2–0	West Ham United	31 January 2021	
February	2021	Portugal	Bruno Fernandes (2)	Manchester United	2–0	Everton	6 February 2021	
March	2021	Argentina	Erik Lamela	Tottenham Hotspur	1–0	Arsenal	14 March 2021	
April	2021	England	Jesse Lingard	West Ham United	1–0	Wolverhampton Wanderers	5 April 2021	
May	2021	Uruguay	Edinson Cavani	Manchester United	1–0	Fulham	18 May 2021	
2021–22 Premier League
August	2021	England	Danny Ings	Aston Villa	1–0	Newcastle United	21 August 2021	
September	2021	England	Andros Townsend (3)	Everton	2–1	Burnley	13 September 2021	
October	2021	Egypt	Mohamed Salah (2)	Liverpool	2–1	Manchester City	3 October 2021	
November	2021	Spain	Rodri	Manchester City	2–0	Everton	21 November 2021	
December	2021	France	Alexandre Lacazette	Arsenal	1−0	Southampton	11 December 2021	
January	2022	Croatia	Mateo Kovačić	Chelsea	1−2	Liverpool	2 January 2022	
February	2022	Ivory Coast	Wilfried Zaha	Crystal Palace	1−1	Norwich City	10 February 2022	
March	2022	Portugal	Cristiano Ronaldo	Manchester United	1−0	Tottenham Hotspur	12 March 2022	
April	2022	Paraguay	Miguel Almirón (1)	Newcastle United	1−0	Crystal Palace	20 April 2022	
2022–23 Premier League
August	2022	France	Allan Saint-Maximin	Newcastle United	1–1	Wolverhampton Wanderers	28 August 2022	
September	2022	England	Ivan Toney	Brentford	3–1	Leeds United	3 September 2022	
October	2022	Paraguay	Miguel Almirón (2)	Newcastle United	2–0	Fulham	1 October 2022	
November/ December	2022	Jamaica	Demarai Gray	Everton	1–1	Manchester City	31 December 2022	
January	2023	France	Michael Olise	Crystal Palace	1–1	Manchester United	18 January 2023	
February	2023	Brazil	Willian (2)	Fulham	1–0	Nottingham Forest	11 February 2023	
March	2023	Spain	Jonny	Wolverhampton Wanderers	1–3	Leeds United	18 March 2023	
April	2023	Portugal	Matheus Nunes	Wolverhampton Wanderers	1–0	Chelsea	8 April 2023	
2023–24 Premier League
August	2023	Japan	Kaoru Mitoma (1)	Brighton & Hove Albion	1–0	Wolverhampton Wanderers	19 August 2023	
September	2023	Portugal	Bruno Fernandes (3)	Manchester United	1–0	Burnley	23 September 2023	
October	2023	Iran	Saman Ghoddos	Brentford	3–0	Burnley	21 October 2023	
November	2023	Argentina	Alejandro Garnacho	Manchester United	1–0	Everton	26 November 2023	
December	2023	Argentina	Alexis Mac Allister	Liverpool	2–1	Fulham	3 December 2023	
January	2024	Norway	Oscar Bobb	Manchester City	3–2	Newcastle United	13 January 2024	
February	2024	England	Kobbie Mainoo	Manchester United	4–3	Wolverhampton Wanderers	1 February 2024	
March	2024	England	Marcus Rashford	Manchester United	1–0	Manchester City	3 March 2024	
April	2024	England	Cole Palmer (1)	Chelsea	1–0	Everton	15 April 2024	
2024–25 Premier League
August	2024	England	Cole Palmer (2)	Chelsea	2–1	Wolverhampton Wanderers	25 August 2024	
September	2024	Colombia	Jhon Durán	Aston Villa	3–2	Everton	14 September 2024	
October	2024	Senegal	Nicolas Jackson	Chelsea	1–0	Newcastle United	27 October 2024	
November	2024	Wales	Harry Wilson (1)	Fulham	1–1	Brentford	4 November 2024	
December	2024	Sweden	Alexander Isak	Newcastle United	1–0	Liverpool	4 December 2024	
January	2025	Wales	David Brooks	Bournemouth	1–0	Everton	4 January 2025	
February	2025	Japan	Kaoru Mitoma (2)	Brighton & Hove Albion	1–0	Chelsea	14 February 2025	
March	2025	Sweden	Jens Cajuste	Ipswich Town	1–3	Nottingham Forest	15 March 2025	
April	2025	Cameroon	Carlos Baleba	Brighton & Hove Albion	3–2	West Ham United	26 April 2025	
2025–26 Premier League
August	2025	Hungary	Dominik Szoboszlai	Liverpool	1–0	Arsenal	31 August 2025	
September	2025	Spain	Martín Zubimendi	Arsenal	1–0	Nottingham Forest	13 September 2025	
October	2025	Argentina	Emiliano Buendía	Aston Villa	2–1	Tottenham Hotspur	19 October 2025	
November	2025	United States	Tyler Adams	Bournemouth	2–0	Sunderland	29 November 2025	
December	2025	Wales	Harry Wilson (2)	Fulham	1–1	Crystal Palace	7 December 2025	
January	2026	England	Harrison Reed	Fulham	2–2	Liverpool	4 January 2026	
February	2026	England	Dominic Solanke	Tottenham Hotspur	2–2	Manchester City	1 February 2026	
March	2026	Denmark	William Osula	Newcastle United	2–1	Manchester United	4 March 2026	
April	2026	Japan	Kaoru Mitoma (3)	Brighton & Hove Albion	1–1	Tottenham Hotspur	18 April 2026	
2026–27 Premier League
August	2026	Sweden	Anthony Elanga	Newcastle United	1–0	Tottenham Hotspur	29 August 2026	
September	2026	England	Lewis Dunk	Brighton & Hove Albion	5–0	Coventry City	13 September 2026	
October	2026	Paraguay	Diego Gómez	Brighton & Hove Albion	2–0	Crystal Palace	18 October 2026	

1. The score right after the goal. Player's team's score listed first.

== Multiple winners ==
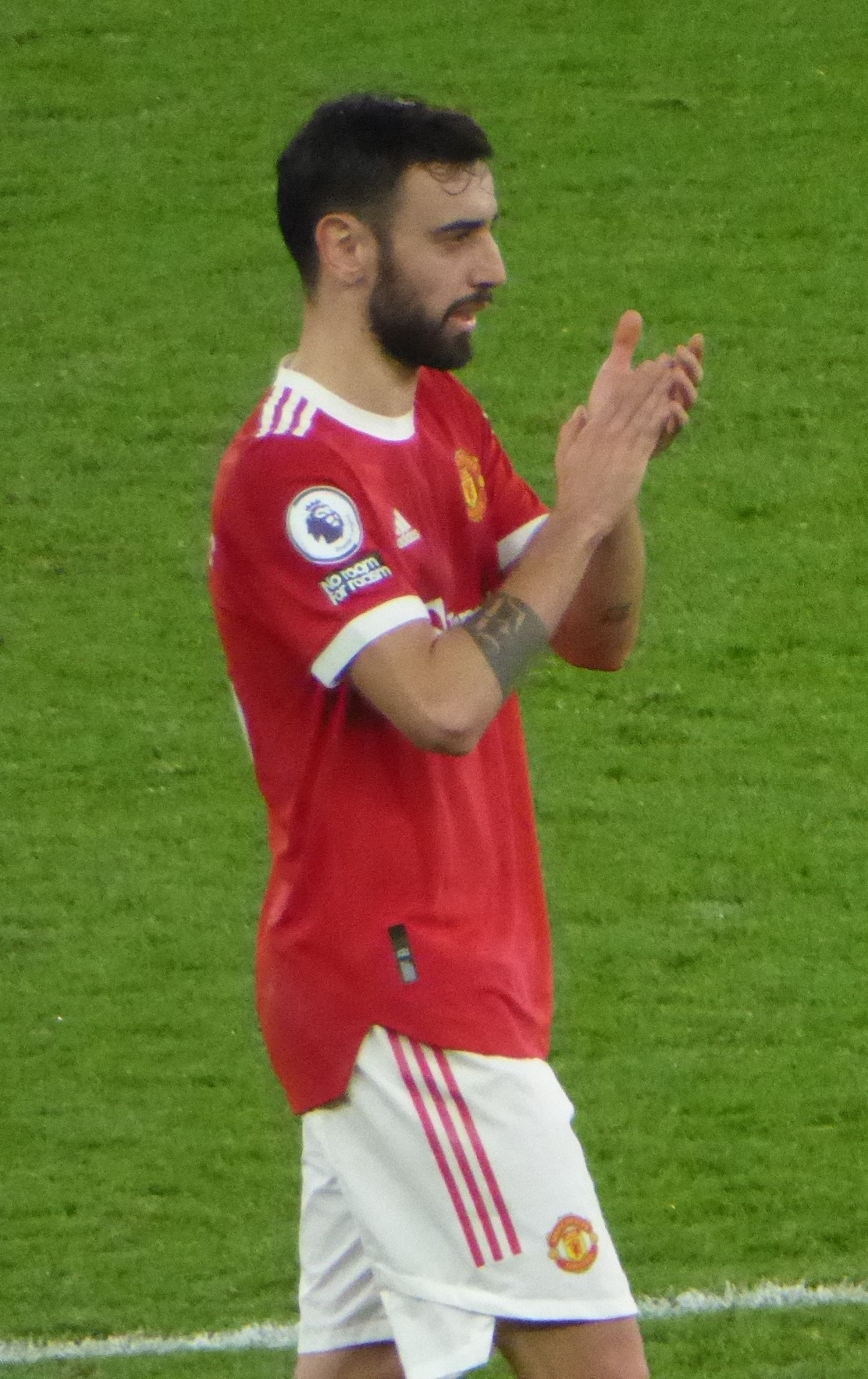
Bruno Fernandes is the first player to have won the award three times with the same club.

The following table lists the number of awards won by players who have won at least two Goal of the Month awards.

Players in bold are still active in the Premier League.

As of October 2026 award

Rank	Players	Wins
1st	(Portugal) **Bruno Fernandes**	3
1st	(Japan) **Kaoru Mitoma**	3
1st	(England) Andros Townsend	3
4th	(Paraguay) Miguel Almirón	2
4th	(Belgium) Kevin De Bruyne	2
4th	(Belgium) Eden Hazard	2
4th	(England) **Cole Palmer**	2
4th	(Spain) Pedro	2
4th	(Egypt) Mohamed Salah	2
4th	(South Korea) Son Heung-min	2
4th	(Brazil) Willian	2
4th	(Wales) **Harry Wilson**	2

== Awards won by club ==
As of October 2026 award

Club	Players	Total
Manchester United	8	10
Chelsea	6	9
Newcastle United	7	8
Brighton & Hove Albion	6	8
Fulham	6	7
Liverpool	5	6
Tottenham Hotspur	5	6
West Ham United	5	5
Bournemouth	4	4
Crystal Palace	3	4
Manchester City	3	4
Arsenal	3	3
Aston Villa	3	3
Everton	3	3
Leicester City	3	3
Brentford	2	2
Southampton	2	2
Wolverhampton Wanderers	2	2
Burnley	1	1
Ipswich Town	1	1
Middlesbrough	1	1

== Awards won by nationality ==
As of October 2026 award

Country	Players	Total
England	20	23
Argentina	5	5
France	5	5
Portugal	3	5
Spain	4	5
Wales	3	4
Belgium	2	4
Ivory Coast	3	3
Sweden	3	3
Paraguay	2	3
Japan	1	3
Brazil	1	2
Egypt	1	2
South Korea	1	2
Denmark	2	2
Iran	2	2
Uruguay	2	2
Armenia	1	1
Cameroon	1	1
Colombia	1	1
Croatia	1	1
Czech Republic	1	1
Ecuador	1	1
Germany	1	1
Hungary	1	1
Jamaica	1	1
Kenya	1	1
Mali	1	1
Morocco	1	1
Nigeria	1	1
Norway	1	1
Senegal	1	1
Switzerland	1	1
United States	1	1

== See also ==
- BBC Goal of the Month
- Premier League Goal of the Season
- Premier League Save of the Month
- Premier League Player of the Month
- Premier League Manager of the Month
