= Premier League Playmaker of the Season =

- Awarded for: The most assists in a given Premier League season
- Sponsored by: Castrol
- Country: England
- Presented by: Premier League
- First award: 2018
- Currently held by: Bruno Fernandes

Highlights
- Most awards: Kevin De Bruyne (3)
- Most team wins: Manchester City (3)

The Premier League Playmaker of the Season is an annual English football award, presented to the player who has made the most assists (the last pass made before a goal scored) in the Premier League. For sponsorship purposes, it was called the Cadbury Playmaker of the Season between its inception during the 2017–18 season and 2019–20 season. For the 2020–21 season, it was known as the Coca-Cola Zero Sugar Playmaker of the Season; from the 2021–22 to 2024–25 season it was known as the Castrol Playmaker of the Season, before being renamed the Golden Playmaker.

In 2018, the Premier League Playmaker of the Season was first awarded, with Kevin De Bruyne of Manchester City its inaugural recipient. The current holder of the award is Manchester United midfielder Bruno Fernandes.

== Winners ==
Key
Player (X)	Player name (count of multiple wins if applicable)
	Indicates multiple award winners in the same season
	Denotes the number of assists was also a Premier League record
	Denotes the club were Premier League champions in the same season
	Denotes the player also won Premier League Player of the Season

Premier League top assists of the Season winners
Season	Player	Nationality	Club	Assists	Ref.
1992–93	Eric Cantona (1)	France	Leeds United	16	
1992–93	Eric Cantona (1)	France	Manchester United	16	
1993–94	Andy Cole	England	Newcastle United	13	
1993–94	Eric Cantona (2)	France	Manchester United	13	
1994–95	Matt Le Tissier	England	Southampton	15	
1995–96	Steve McManaman	England	Liverpool	15	
1996–97	Eric Cantona (3)	France	Manchester United	12	
1997–98	David Beckham (1)	England	Manchester United	13	
1998–99	Dennis Bergkamp	Netherlands	Arsenal	13	
1998–99	Jimmy Floyd Hasselbaink	Netherlands	Leeds United	13	
1999–2000	David Beckham (2)	England	Manchester United	15	
1999–2000	Nolberto Solano	Peru	Newcastle United	15	
2000–01	David Beckham (3)	England	Manchester United	12	
2001–02	Robert Pirès	France	Arsenal	15	
2002–03	Thierry Henry	France	Arsenal	20	
2003–04	Muzzy Izzet	Turkey	Leicester City	14	
2004–05	Frank Lampard (1)	England	Chelsea	18	
2005–06	Didier Drogba	Ivory Coast	Chelsea	11	
2006–07	Cesc Fàbregas (1)	Spain	Arsenal	11	
2006–07	Wayne Rooney	England	Manchester United	11	
2007–08	Cesc Fàbregas (2)	Spain	Arsenal	17	
2008–09	Frank Lampard (2)	England	Chelsea	10	
2008–09	Robin van Persie	Netherlands	Arsenal	10	
2009–10	Frank Lampard (3)	England	Chelsea	16	
2010–11	Nani	Portugal	Manchester United	14	
2011–12	David Silva	Spain	Manchester City	15	
2012–13	Juan Mata	Spain	Chelsea	12	
2013–14	Luis Suárez	Uruguay	Liverpool	13	
2013–14	Steven Gerrard	England	Liverpool	13	
2014–15	Cesc Fàbregas (3)	Spain	Chelsea	19	
2015–16	Mesut Özil	Germany	Arsenal	19	
2016–17	Kevin De Bruyne	Belgium	Manchester City	18	

Premier League Playmaker of the Season winners
Season	Player	Nationality	Club	Assists	Ref.
2017–18	Kevin De Bruyne (1)	Belgium	Manchester City	16	
2018–19	Eden Hazard	Belgium	Chelsea	15	
2019–20	Kevin De Bruyne (2)	Belgium	Manchester City	20	
2020–21	Harry Kane	England	Tottenham Hotspur	14	
2021–22	Mohamed Salah (1)	Egypt	Liverpool	13	
2022–23	Kevin De Bruyne (3)	Belgium	Manchester City	16	
2023–24	Ollie Watkins	England	Aston Villa	13	
2024–25	Mohamed Salah (2)	Egypt	Liverpool	18	
2025–26	Bruno Fernandes	Portugal	Manchester United	21	

== Multiple awards won by players ==
The following table lists the number of awards won by players who have won at least two Playmaker of the Season awards.

Players in bold are still active in the Premier League.

Awards	Player	Country	Seasons
3	Kevin De Bruyne	Belgium	2017–18, 2019–20, 2022–23
2	Mohamed Salah	Egypt	2021–22, 2024–25

== Awards won by nationality ==
Country	Players	Total
Belgium	2	4
England	2	2
Egypt	1	2
Portugal	1	1

== Awards won by club ==
Club	Players	Total
Manchester City	1	3
Liverpool	1	2
Aston Villa	1	1
Chelsea	1	1
Manchester United	1	1
Tottenham Hotspur	1	1

== See also ==
- Premier League Player of the Season
- Premier League Young Player of the Season
- Premier League Manager of the Season
- Premier League Goal of the Season
- Premier League Save of the Season
- Premier League Game Changer of the Season
- Premier League Golden Boot
- Premier League Golden Glove
- Premier League Most Powerful Goal
