= Premier League Game Changer of the Season =

English annual football award

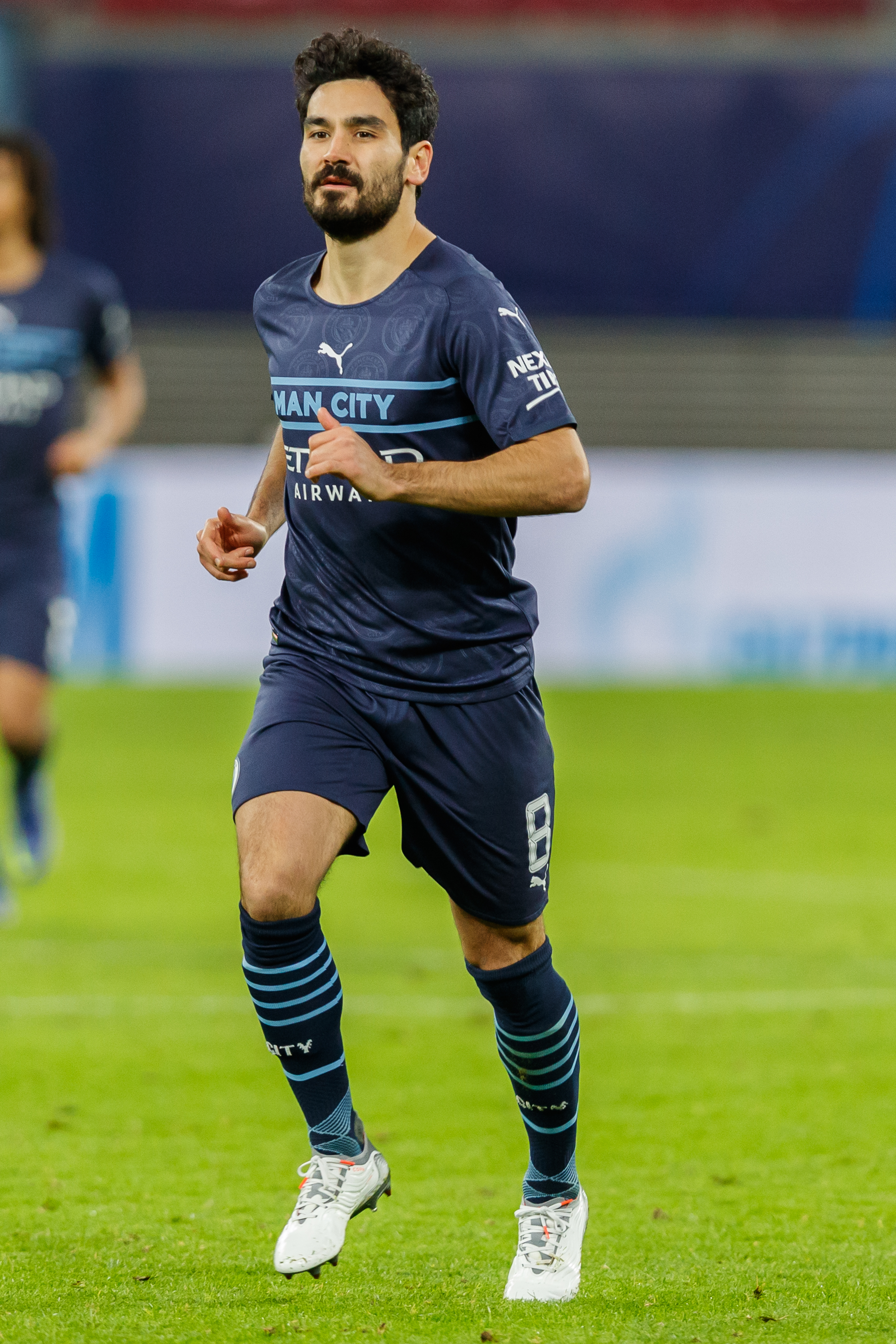
İlkay Gündoğan won the inaugural Premier League Game Changer of the Season award in 2022.

The Premier League Game Changer of the Season was an annual English football award, given to the player that was considered to have had the most game-changing performance over the course of the campaign. For sponsorship purposes, it was called the Castrol Game Changer of the Season since its introduction, starting in the 2021–22 season.

In 2022, the Premier League Game Changer of the Season was first awarded, with İlkay Gündoğan of Manchester City being named the award's inaugural recipient. The final recipient of the award was Chelsea midfielder Cole Palmer.

== Winners ==
Key
Player (X)	Name of the player and number of times they had won the award at that point (if more than one)
‡	Denotes the club were Premier League champions in the same season

Key
Italics	Home team

Premier League Game Changer of the Season winners
Season	Player	Nationality	Club	Score	Opponent	Date	Ref.
2021–22	İlkay Gündoğan	Germany	Manchester City‡	3–2	Aston Villa	22 May 2022	
2022–23	Reiss Nelson	England	Arsenal	3–2	Bournemouth	4 March 2023	
2023–24	Cole Palmer	England	Chelsea	4–3	Manchester United	4 April 2024	

1. Player's team's score listed first.

== Awards won by nationality ==
Country	Players	Total
England	2	2
Germany	1	1

== Awards won by club ==
Club	Players	Total
Arsenal	1	1
Chelsea	1	1
Manchester City	1	1

== See also ==
- Premier League Goal of the Season
- Premier League Player of the Season
- Premier League Young Player of the Season
- Premier League Playmaker of the Season
- Premier League Manager of the Season
- Premier League Save of the Season
- Premier League Most Powerful Goal
