= Premier League Manager of the Season =

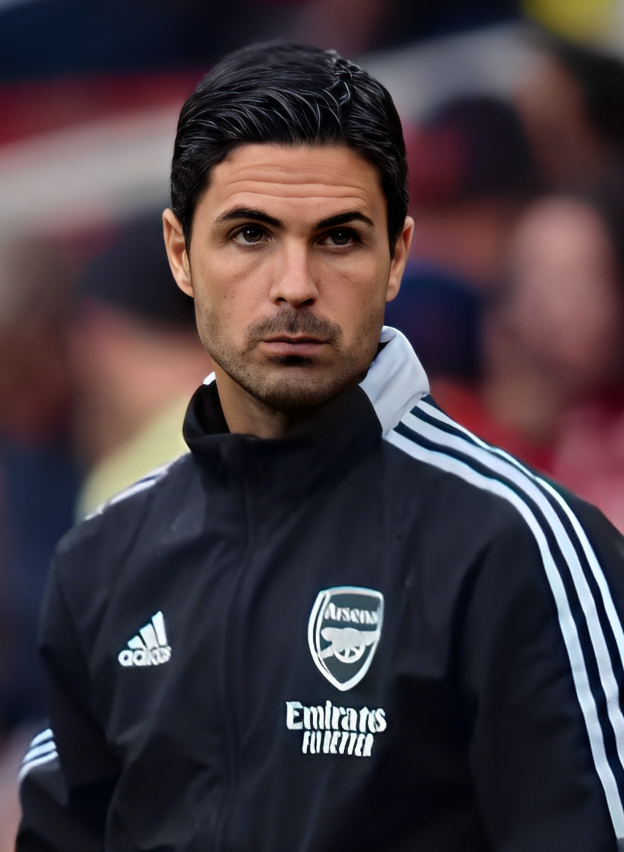
- Arsenal manager Mikel Arteta is the current holder of the award.
- Awarded for: The most outstanding manager in each given Premier League season
- Sponsored by: Barclays
- Country: England
- Presented by: Premier League
- First award: 1994
- Currently held by: Mikel Arteta (1st win)

Highlights
- Most awards: Sir Alex Ferguson (11)
- Most consecutive wins: Sir Alex Ferguson (3)
- Most team wins: Manchester United (11)
- Most consecutive team wins: Manchester United (3)
- Website: https://www.premierleague.com/awards?at=2&aw=21&se=-1

The Premier League Manager of the Season is an annual association football award presented to managers in England. It recognises the most outstanding manager in the Premier League each season. The recipient is chosen by a panel assembled by the league's sponsors and is announced in the second or third week of May. The award was established during the 1993–94 season by then-league title sponsor Carling. For sponsorship purposes, it was called the Carling Manager of the Year from 1994 to 2001, the Barclaycard Manager of the Year from 2001 to 2004, and since 2004 known as the Barclays Manager of the Season.

In 1994, the inaugural Manager of the Season award was given to Manchester United manager Sir Alex Ferguson for retaining the league championship. The current holder of the award is Arsenal manager Mikel Arteta.

The most awards won by a single manager is eleven, achieved by Sir Alex Ferguson between 1994 and his retirement in 2013. He accounted for more than half of the awards in that period of time. In 1998 Arsène Wenger became the first non-British manager to win the award, and received it on two further occasions with Arsenal. José Mourinho, Pep Guardiola and Jürgen Klopp are the only managers other than Sir Alex Ferguson and Wenger to have won the award on more than on one occasion, with the two first being the only managers other than Ferguson to win the award in consecutive seasons.

Five managers have won the award without winning the Premier League trophy in the same season, reflecting the weight of their achievements: George Burley in 2000–01, having guided Ipswich Town to fifth place in the league, after only securing the club's promotion from the First Division the previous season; Harry Redknapp in 2009–10, for steering Tottenham Hotspur to a top-four finish for the first time in twenty years, Alan Pardew in 2011–12, having guided Newcastle United to their highest position in nine years, Tony Pulis in 2013–14, for steering Crystal Palace from bottom of the league in November to an 11th-place finish, and Jürgen Klopp in 2021–22, after finishing second with Liverpool in a tight battle for the title, finishing just one point off the top despite being 14 points behind in January.

== History ==
The Premier League was formed in 1992, when the members of the First Division resigned from The Football League. These clubs set up a new commercially independent league that negotiated its own broadcast and sponsorship agreements. The inaugural season had no sponsor until Carling agreed to a four-year £12 million deal that started the following season. That same season, Carling introduced the Manager of the Month and Manager of the Season awards, in addition to the existing manager of the year award presented by the League Managers Association.

The award Sir Alex Ferguson received after winning the 2012–13 Premier League season

The first Manager of the Season award was presented to Sir Alex Ferguson after winning the Premier League with Manchester United for the second consecutive season. Kenny Dalglish was awarded the accolade in the 1994–95 season, having guided Blackburn Rovers to their first league title in 81 years. Despite losing to Liverpool on the final matchday, Blackburn secured the championship when Manchester United failed to beat West Ham United the same day. Manchester United regained the Premier League the following season, resisting Newcastle United's threat, and successfully retained the championship in 1996–97, ensuring that Ferguson became the first manager to win two consecutive awards.

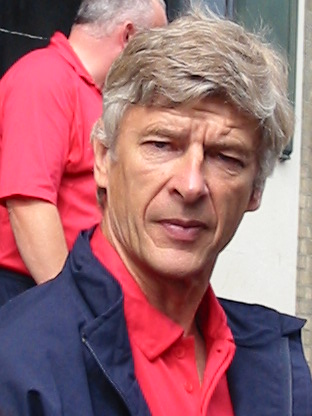
Arsène Wenger, winner in 1998, 2002 and 2004 with Arsenal

Arsène Wenger was the first non–British manager to receive the Manager of the Season award, having led Arsenal to the top of the Premier League in 1997–98, his first full season at the club. This achievement was significant given that Arsenal were, at one stage, 12 points behind leaders Manchester United. After a climactic finish to the 1998–99 season, Sir Alex Ferguson was presented with his fifth managerial award for winning the Premier League with Manchester United. The club beat Tottenham Hotspur on the last matchday to secure their fifth championship in seven years, and in the following week completed a treble of trophies consisting of the domestic league, FA Cup and UEFA Champions League. Ferguson received the accolade again in 1999–2000, as Manchester United finished 18 points above second-placed Arsenal.

Ipswich Town manager George Burley was the winner in 2000–01, the first time the award did not go to a league-winning manager. Ipswich Town, who won promotion to the Premier League from the First Division in the previous season, finished fifth and qualified for the UEFA Cup. Burley triumphed over Sir Alex Ferguson, who led Manchester United to their third consecutive championship title, and Liverpool manager Gérard Houllier, who guided his team to three trophies and a berth in the Champions League. Wenger was named the Manager of the Season for 2001–02 after guiding Arsenal to thirteen consecutive wins towards the end of the season – a run which ensured the club regained the Premier League trophy. For winning his eighth Premier League title with Manchester United, Ferguson was given the award in the 2002–03 season. Wenger was the outstanding winner for the award in 2003–04 as he managed Arsenal to an unprecedented achievement of winning the league without a single defeat. Reflecting on Wenger's accomplishment, a Barclaycard Awards Panel spokesperson said "Arsène Wenger is a very worthy recipient of this accolade and has sent his team into the history books. Arsenal have played exciting attacking football throughout the season and finishing it unbeaten is a feat that may not be repeated for another 100 years."

Chelsea manager José Mourinho was chosen as the recipient for the 2004–05 season for taking the club to its first league championship in 50 years. Chelsea finished the season with a league-record 95 points, 12 points ahead of runners-up Arsenal, scoring 72 goals and conceding 15 in the process. Mourinho won the award a second successive time the following season – the first foreign manager to do so – as Chelsea won their second Premier League title. Sir Alex Ferguson collected the award for the 2006–07, 2007–08 and 2008–09 seasons, in a period when Manchester United regained the domestic title after a four-year drought and retained the trophy for a further two years. Tottenham manager Harry Redknapp was presented with the award at the end of the 2009–10 season, having guided the club to fourth position and a spot in the following season's Champions League at the expense of Manchester City. In May 2011, Sir Alex Ferguson picked up his tenth Manager of the Season award for leading Manchester United to a record 19th league title. In May 2012, Alan Pardew won his first Manager of the Season award after guiding Newcastle United to their highest position in nine years. In May 2013, Sir Alex Ferguson picked up his eleventh Manager of the Season award for leading Manchester United to a record 20th league title. Tony Pulis became the first Welsh recipient of the award in May 2014, for guiding Crystal Palace from bottom place to 11th.

== Winners ==
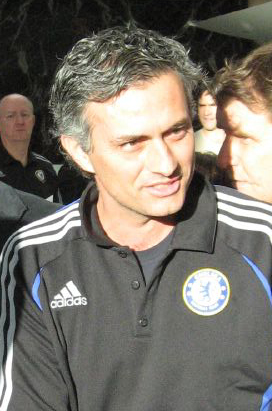
José Mourinho has won the award three times with Chelsea.

Key
†	Denotes the club were not Premier League champions in the same season

Winners of the Premier League Manager of the Season
Season	Manager	Nationality	Club	Ref
1993–94	Alex Ferguson (1)	Scotland	Manchester United	
1994–95	Kenny Dalglish	Scotland	Blackburn Rovers	
1995–96	Alex Ferguson (2)	Scotland	Manchester United	
1996–97	Alex Ferguson (3)	Scotland	Manchester United	
1997–98	Arsène Wenger (1)	France	Arsenal	
1998–99	Alex Ferguson (4)	Scotland	Manchester United	
1999–2000	Alex Ferguson (5)	Scotland	Manchester United	
2000–01	George Burley	Scotland	Ipswich Town^{†}	
2001–02	Arsène Wenger (2)	France	Arsenal	
2002–03	Alex Ferguson (6)	Scotland	Manchester United	
2003–04	Arsène Wenger (3)	France	Arsenal	
2004–05	José Mourinho (1)	Portugal	Chelsea	
2005–06	José Mourinho (2)	Portugal	Chelsea	
2006–07	Alex Ferguson (7)	Scotland	Manchester United	
2007–08	Alex Ferguson (8)	Scotland	Manchester United	
2008–09	Alex Ferguson (9)	Scotland	Manchester United	
2009–10	Harry Redknapp	England	Tottenham Hotspur^{†}	
2010–11	Alex Ferguson (10)	Scotland	Manchester United	
2011–12	Alan Pardew	England	Newcastle United^{†}	
2012–13	Alex Ferguson (11)	Scotland	Manchester United	
2013–14	Tony Pulis	Wales	Crystal Palace^{†}	
2014–15	José Mourinho (3)	Portugal	Chelsea	
2015–16	Claudio Ranieri	Italy	Leicester City	
2016–17	Antonio Conte	Italy	Chelsea	
2017–18	Pep Guardiola (1)	Spain	Manchester City	
2018–19	Pep Guardiola (2)	Spain	Manchester City	
2019–20	Jürgen Klopp (1)	Germany	Liverpool	
2020–21	Pep Guardiola (3)	Spain	Manchester City	
2021–22	Jürgen Klopp (2)	Germany	Liverpool^{†}	
2022–23	Pep Guardiola (4)	Spain	Manchester City	
2023–24	Pep Guardiola (5)	Spain	Manchester City	
2024–25	Arne Slot	Netherlands	Liverpool	
2025–26	Mikel Arteta	Spain	Arsenal	

== Multiple awards won by managers ==
The following table lists the number of awards won by managers who have won at least two Manager of the Season awards.

Managers in bold are still active in the Premier League.

Awards	Manager	Country	Seasons
11	Alex Ferguson	Scotland	1993–94, 1995–96, 1996–97, 1998–99, 1999–2000, 2002–03, 2006–07, 2007–08, 2008–09, 2010–11, 2012–13
5	Pep Guardiola	Spain	2017–18, 2018–19, 2020–21, 2022–23, 2023–24
3	José Mourinho	Portugal	2004–05, 2005–06, 2014–15
3	Arsène Wenger	France	1997–98, 2001–02, 2003–04
2	Jürgen Klopp	Germany	2019–20, 2021–22

== Awards won by nationality ==
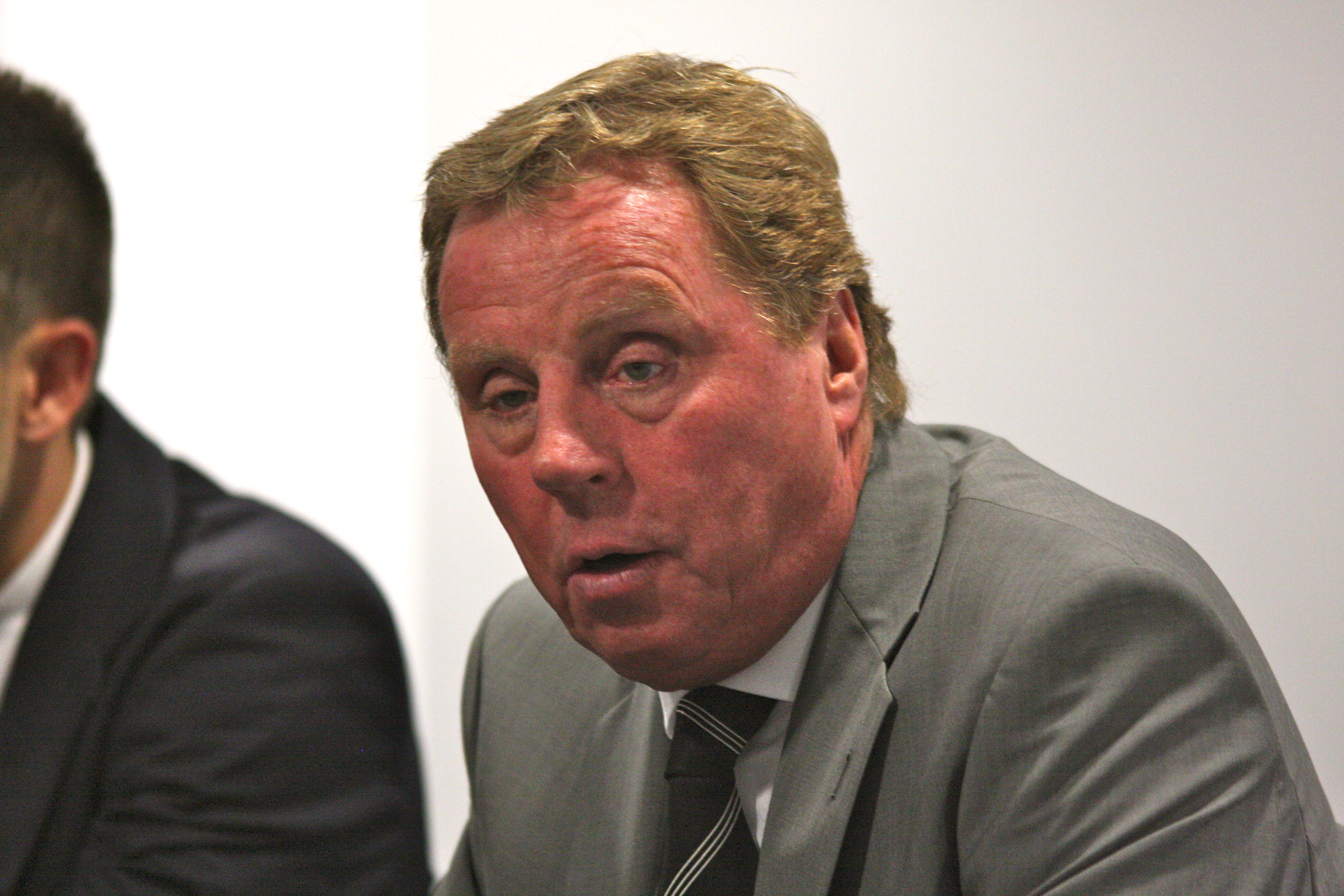
Harry Redknapp was the first Englishman to win the award.

Country	Managers	Total
Scotland	3	13
Spain	2	6
France	1	3
Portugal	1	3
England	2	2
Germany	1	2
Italy	2	2
Netherlands	1	1
Wales	1	1

== Awards won by club ==
Club	Managers	Total
Manchester United	1	11
Manchester City	1	5
Arsenal	2	4
Chelsea	2	4
Liverpool	2	3
Blackburn Rovers	1	1
Crystal Palace	1	1
Ipswich Town	1	1
Leicester City	1	1
Newcastle United	1	1
Tottenham Hotspur	1	1

== See also ==
- League Managers Association Awards
- Premier League Manager of the Month
- Premier League Player of the Season
- Premier League Young Player of the Season
- Premier League Playmaker of the Season
- Premier League Goal of the Season
- Premier League Save of the Season
- Premier League Game Changer of the Season
- Premier League Most Powerful Goal
