= Premier League Goal of the Season =

English football award

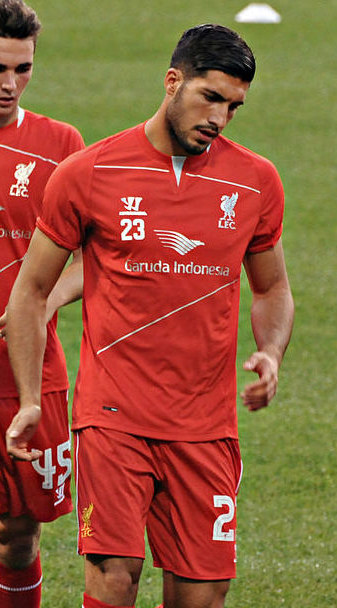
Emre Can won the inaugural award in the 2016–17 season.

The Premier League Goal of the Season is an annual football award for the player deemed to have scored the best goal in the preceding Premier League season.

The shortlist features each of the season's nine Premier League Goal of the Month winners and on occasion, such as in 2016–17, 2018–19, and 2023–24, a goal from May which does not have a monthly vote. The winner is decided by a combination of an online public vote — which contributes to 10% of the final tally — and a panel of experts.

The award was first given following the 2016–17 season and, since 2024–25, has been known by its sponsored name, the Guinness Goal of the Season; the award had been previously sponsored by Carling for its first three iterations and by Budweiser from 2019–20 to 2023–24. In 2020, the Premier League backdated the award and named an unofficial winner for every season since its inception.

First recipient of the award was Liverpool's Emre Can for his bicycle kick away at Watford. The current holder of the award is Fulham's Harrison Reed for his long-range strike against Liverpool.

== Winners ==
Key
**Bold**	Player still active in the Premier League
†	Indicates player who also won the FIFA Puskás Award for this goal
‡	Indicates player who also won the Premier League Golden Boot award in the same season
§	Denotes the club were Premier League champions in the same season
Italics	Home team

Season	Player	Nationality	Team	Score (Note: The score at the time of the goal. Player's team's score listed first.)	Opponent	Date	Ref.
2016–17	Emre Can	Germany	Liverpool	**1**–0	Watford	1 May 2017	
2017–18	Sofiane Boufal	Morocco	Southampton	**1**–0	West Bromwich Albion	21 October 2017	
2018–19	Andros Townsend	England	Crystal Palace	**2**–1	Manchester City	22 December 2018	
2019–20	Son Heung-min†	South Korea	Tottenham Hotspur	**3**–0	Burnley	7 December 2019	
2020–21	Erik Lamela†	Argentina	Tottenham Hotspur	**1**–0	Arsenal	14 March 2021	
2021–22	Mohamed Salah‡	Egypt	Liverpool	**2**–1	Manchester City	3 October 2021	
2022–23	Julio Enciso	Paraguay	Brighton & Hove Albion	**1**–1	Manchester City	24 May 2023	
2023–24	**Alejandro Garnacho**†	Argentina	Manchester United	**1**–0	Everton	26 November 2023	
2024–25	**Omar Marmoush**	Egypt	Manchester City	**1**–0	Bournemouth	20 May 2025	
2025–26	**Harrison Reed**	England	Fulham	**2**–2	Liverpool	4 January 2026	

The following awards were retrospectively given, dating back to the Premier League's founding season. However, the awards were unofficial and thus shall not be counted as if it was official.

Season	Player	Nationality	Team	Score	Opponent	Date	Ref.
1992–93	Dalian Atkinson	England	Aston Villa	**3**–1	Wimbledon	3 October 1992	
1993–94	Rod Wallace	England	Leeds United	**1**–0	Tottenham Hotspur	17 April 1994	
1994–95	Matt Le Tissier	England	Southampton	**2**–3	Blackburn Rovers	10 December 1994	
1995–96	Tony Yeboah	Ghana	Leeds United	**3**–1	Wimbledon	23 September 1995	
1996–97	David Beckham	England	Manchester United^{§}	**3**–0	Wimbledon	17 August 1996	
1997–98	Dennis Bergkamp (1)	Netherlands	Arsenal^{§}	**3**–2	Leicester City	27 August 1997	
1998–99	Muzzy Izzet	Turkey	Leicester City	**2**–1	Tottenham Hotspur	19 October 1998	
1999–2000	Paolo Di Canio	Italy	West Ham United	**1**–0	Wimbledon	26 March 2000	
2000–01	Shaun Bartlett	South Africa	Charlton Athletic	**2**–0	Leicester City	1 April 2001	
2001–02	Dennis Bergkamp (2)	Netherlands	Arsenal^{§}	**1**–0	Newcastle United	2 March 2002	
2002–03	Thierry Henry	France	Arsenal	**1**–0	Tottenham Hotspur	16 November 2002	
2003–04	Dietmar Hamann	Germany	Liverpool	**1**–0	Portsmouth	17 March 2004	
2004–05	Patrik Berger	Czech Republic	Portsmouth	**1**–1	Charlton Athletic	21 August 2004	
2005–06	Matthew Taylor	England	Portsmouth	**3**–1	Sunderland	29 October 2005	
2006–07	Wayne Rooney (1)	England	Manchester United^{§}	**2**–0	Bolton Wanderers	17 March 2007	
2007–08	Emmanuel Adebayor	Togo	Arsenal	**3**–1	Tottenham Hotspur	15 September 2007	
2008–09	Glen Johnson	England	Portsmouth	**2**–1	Hull City	22 November 2008	
2009–10	Maynor Figueroa	Honduras	Wigan Athletic	**2**–1	Stoke City	12 December 2009	
2010–11	Wayne Rooney (2)	England	Manchester United^{§}	**2**–1	Manchester City	12 February 2011	
2011–12	Papiss Cissé	Senegal	Newcastle United	**2**–0	Chelsea	2 May 2012	
2012–13	Robin van Persie‡	Netherlands	Manchester United^{§}	**2**–0	Aston Villa	22 April 2013	
2013–14	Jack Wilshere (1)	England	Arsenal	**1**–0	Norwich City	19 October 2013	
2014–15	Jack Wilshere (2)	England	Arsenal	**3**–0	West Bromwich Albion	24 May 2015	
2015–16	Dele Alli	England	Tottenham Hotspur	**2**–1	Crystal Palace	23 January 2016	

== Awards won by nationality ==
Official award winners (2016–17 onwards)

Country	Players	Total
Argentina	2	2
Egypt	2	2
England	2	2
Germany	1	1
Morocco	1	1
Paraguay	1	1
South Korea	1	1

Unofficial award winners (1992–93 to 2015–16)

Country	Players	Total
England	9	11
Netherlands	2	3
Czech Republic	1	1
France	1	1
Ghana	1	1
Honduras	1	1
Italy	1	1
Senegal	1	1
South Africa	1	1
Togo	1	1
Turkey	1	1

== Awards won by club ==
Official award winners (2016–17 onwards)

Club	Players	Total
Liverpool	2	2
Tottenham Hotspur	2	2
Brighton & Hove Albion	1	1
Crystal Palace	1	1
Fulham	1	1
Manchester City	1	1
Manchester United	1	1
Southampton	1	1

Unofficial award winners (1992–93 to 2015–16)

Club	Players	Total
Arsenal	4	6
Manchester United	3	4
Portsmouth	3	3
Leeds United	2	2
Aston Villa	1	1
Charlton Athletic	1	1
Leicester City	1	1
Liverpool	1	1
Newcastle United	1	1
Southampton	1	1
Tottenham Hotspur	1	1
West Ham United	1	1
Wigan Athletic	1	1

== See also ==
- Premier League Goal of the Month
- BBC Goal of the Season
- Premier League Most Powerful Goal
- Premier League Save of the Season
- Premier League Player of the Season
- Premier League Young Player of the Season
- Premier League Playmaker of the Season
- Premier League Manager of the Season
- Premier League Game Changer of the Season
