= Premier League Player of the Season =

English association football award

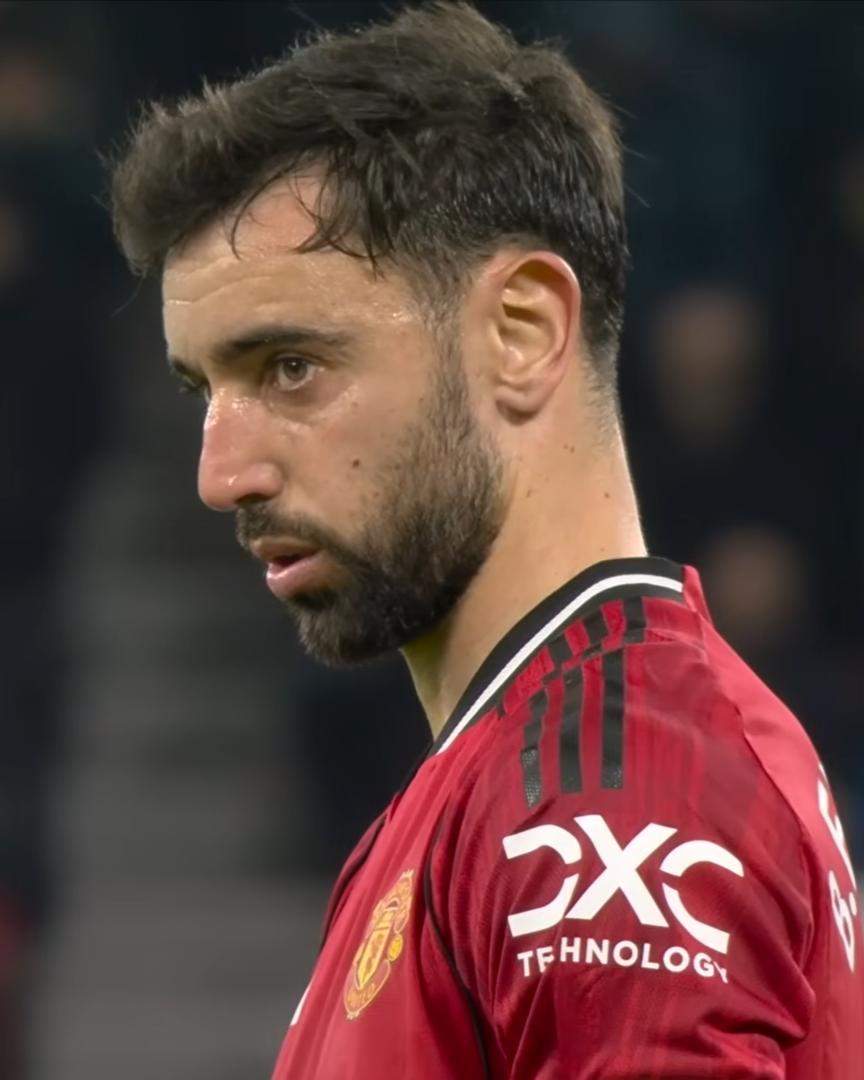
- Manchester United player Bruno Fernandes is the current holder of the award.
- Awarded for: The most outstanding player in each given Premier League season
- Sponsored by: EA Sports
- Country: England
- Presented by: Premier League
- First award: 1995
- Currently held by: Bruno Fernandes

Highlights
- Most awards: Thierry Henry, Cristiano Ronaldo, Nemanja Vidić, Kevin De Bruyne, Mohamed Salah (2)
- Most consecutive wins: Cristiano Ronaldo (2)
- Most team wins: Manchester United (9)
- Most consecutive team wins: Manchester United, Manchester City (5)
- Website: https://www.premierleague.com/awards?at=2&aw=20&se=-1

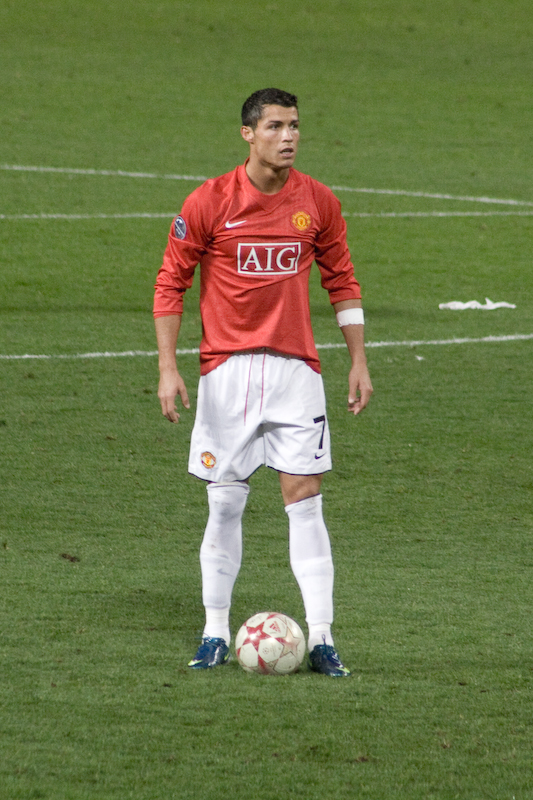
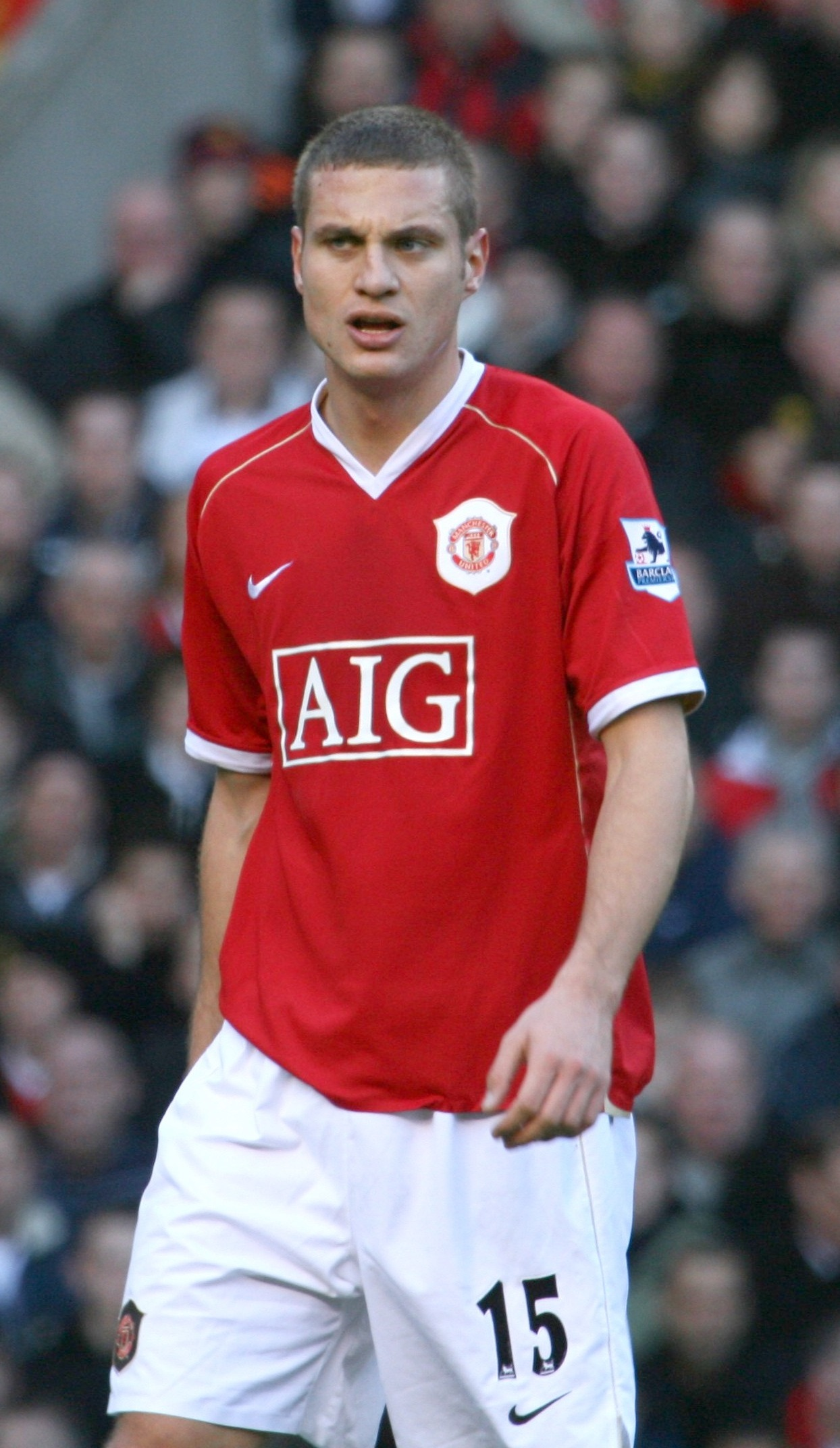
Cristiano Ronaldo (left), Thierry Henry (not pictured), Nemanja Vidić (right), Kevin De Bruyne (not pictured) and Mohamed Salah (not pictured) have won the most Player of the Season awards with two each.

The Premier League Player of the Season is an annual association football award presented to players in England, which recognises the most outstanding player in the Premier League each season. The recipient is chosen by a panel assembled by the league's sponsors consisting of members of "football's governing bodies, the media and fans", and is announced in the second or third week of May. For sponsorship purposes, from 1994 to 2001 it was called the Carling Player of the Year; from 2001 to 2004 as the Barclaycard Player of the Year; and from 2004 to 2016 as the Barclays Player of the Season. Since the 2016–17 season, it is called the EA Sports Player of the Season.

The Premier League was founded in 1992, when the clubs of the First Division left the Football League and established a new commercially independent league that negotiated its own broadcast and sponsorship agreements. The newly formed league had no sponsor for its inaugural season until Carling agreed to a four-year £12 million deal that started the following season. That same season, Carling introduced individual awards for players, such as the Golden Boot. However, the Player of the Month and Player of the Season awards were only first bestowed during the 1994–95 season. The first Player of the Season award was given to Blackburn Rovers striker Alan Shearer, who won the Premier League title with his team and the Golden Boot that season.

Thierry Henry, Cristiano Ronaldo, Nemanja Vidić, Kevin De Bruyne and Mohamed Salah have been Player of the Season on two occasions each and are the only players to have won the award more than once, with Ronaldo having achieved this in consecutive years (2007 and 2008). Eight players were the Premier League's leading goalscorer and won the Golden Boot alongside the Player of the Season award. Four of these players – Kevin Phillips, Henry, Ronaldo and Luis Suárez – went on to win the European Golden Shoe in the same season. Eleven players have won the Premier League trophy with their respective clubs in the same year they received the award, with Peter Schmeichel being the only goalkeeper achieving the feat. Ronaldo is the only player to be named Player of the Season and win the FIFA World Player of the Year; when he accomplished this in 2008, he became the first player from the Premier League to be voted the world's top footballer. In 2023, Erling Haaland became the first player in Premier League history to win both Player of the Season and Young Player of the Season awards for the same campaign.

== Winners ==
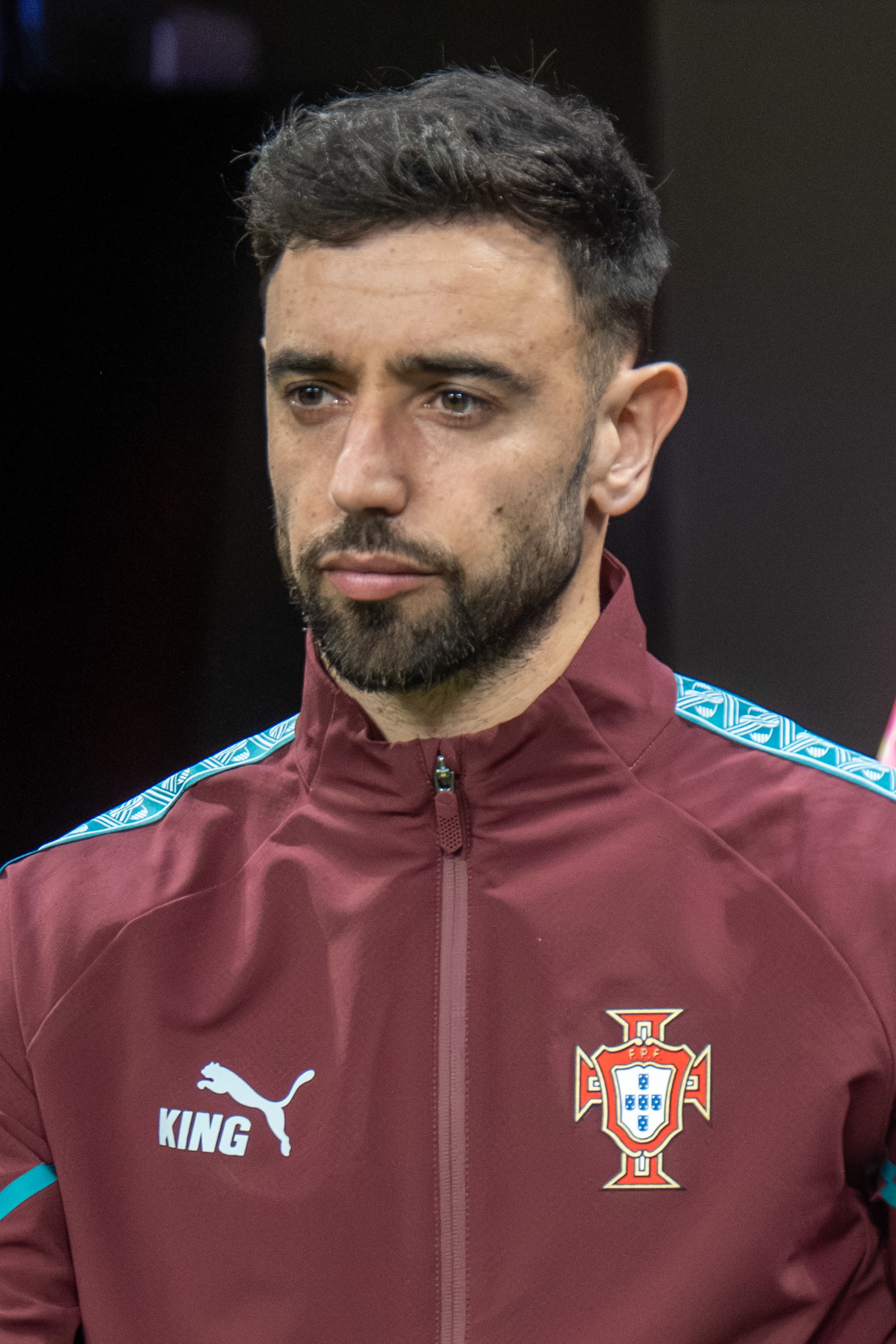
Bruno Fernandes is the current holder of the award for the 2025–26 season.

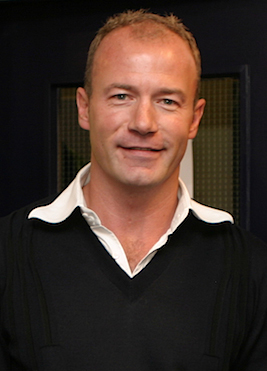
Alan Shearer won the inaugural Premier League Player of the Season in 1995.

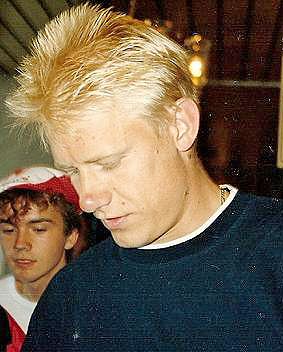
Peter Schmeichel, the 1996 winner, is the only goalkeeper to win the award.

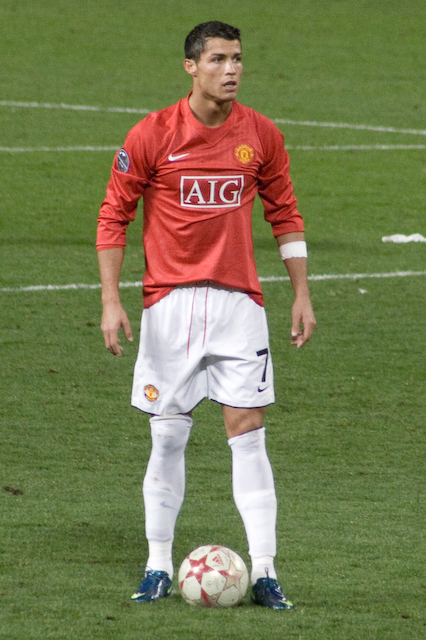
Cristiano Ronaldo, the 2007 and 2008 recipient, won his latter award alongside the FIFA World Player of the Year.

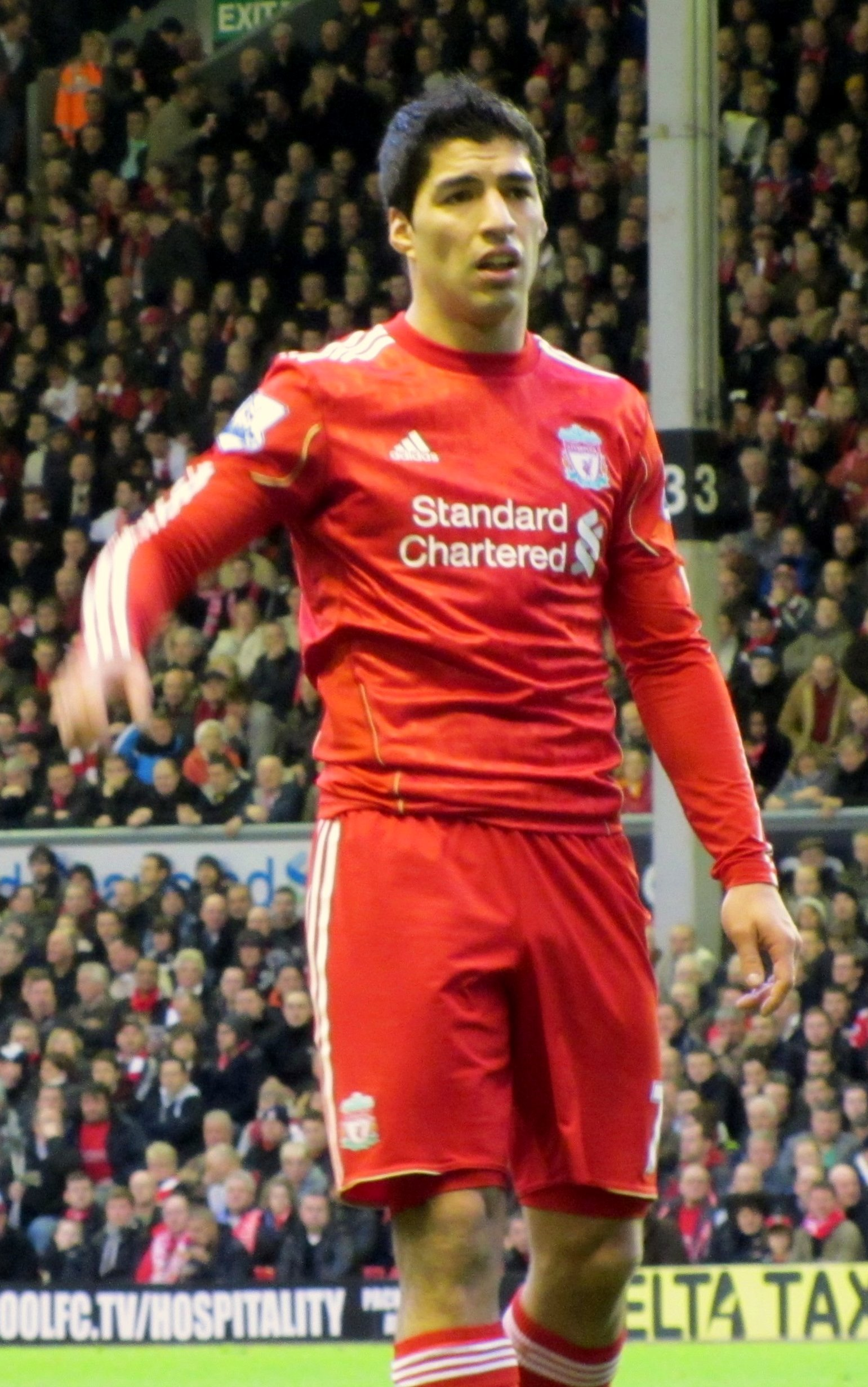
Luis Suárez, the 2014 recipient of the award, is one of four different players to win the European Golden Shoe alongside the Player of the Season award.

Key
Player (X)	Name of the player and number of times they had won the award at that point (if more than one)
†	Indicates player also won the European Golden Shoe in the same season
‡	Indicates player also won the European Golden Shoe and FIFA World Player of the Year in the same season
#	Indicates player also won the European Golden Shoe and Premier League Young Player of the Season award in the same season
§	Denotes the club were Premier League champions in the same season

Premier League Player of the Season winners
Season	Player	Position (Note: The Premier League general reference below links to the database search of all footballers who have played in the league, where the profiles of each winner can be found and their position verified.)	Nationality	Club	Ref(s)
1994–95	Alan Shearer	Forward	England	Blackburn Rovers^{§}	
1995–96	Peter Schmeichel	Goalkeeper	Denmark	Manchester United^{§}	
1996–97	Juninho Paulista	Midfielder	Brazil	Middlesbrough	
1997–98	Michael Owen	Forward	England	Liverpool	
1998–99	Dwight Yorke	Forward	Trinidad and Tobago	Manchester United^{§}	
1999–2000	Kevin Phillips^{†}	Forward	England	Sunderland	
2000–01	Patrick Vieira	Midfielder	France	Arsenal	
2001–02	Freddie Ljungberg	Midfielder	Sweden	Arsenal^{§}	
2002–03	Ruud van Nistelrooy	Forward	Netherlands	Manchester United^{§}	
2003–04	Thierry Henry^{†} (1)	Forward	France	Arsenal^{§}	
2004–05	Frank Lampard	Midfielder	England	Chelsea^{§}	
2005–06	Thierry Henry (2)	Forward	France	Arsenal	
2006–07	Cristiano Ronaldo (1)	Midfielder	Portugal	Manchester United^{§}	
2007–08	Cristiano Ronaldo^{‡}(2)	Midfielder	Portugal	Manchester United^{§}	
2008–09	Nemanja Vidić (1)	Defender	Serbia	Manchester United^{§}	
2009–10	Wayne Rooney	Forward	England	Manchester United	
2010–11	Nemanja Vidić (2)	Defender	Serbia	Manchester United^{§}	
2011–12	Vincent Kompany	Defender	Belgium	Manchester City^{§}	
2012–13	Gareth Bale	Midfielder	Wales	Tottenham Hotspur	
2013–14	Luis Suárez^{†}	Forward	Uruguay	Liverpool	
2014–15	Eden Hazard	Midfielder	Belgium	Chelsea^{§}	
2015–16	Jamie Vardy	Forward	England	Leicester City^{§}	
2016–17	N'Golo Kanté	Midfielder	France	Chelsea^{§}	
2017–18	Mohamed Salah (1)	Forward	Egypt	Liverpool	
2018–19	Virgil van Dijk	Defender	Netherlands	Liverpool	
2019–20	Kevin De Bruyne (1)	Midfielder	Belgium	Manchester City	
2020–21	Rúben Dias	Defender	Portugal	Manchester City^{§}	
2021–22	Kevin De Bruyne (2)	Midfielder	Belgium	Manchester City^{§}	
2022–23	Erling Haaland^{#}	Forward	Norway	Manchester City^{§}	
2023–24	Phil Foden	Midfielder	England	Manchester City^{§}	
2024–25	Mohamed Salah (2)	Forward	Egypt	Liverpool^{§}	
2025–26	Bruno Fernandes	Midfielder	Portugal	Manchester United	

== Multiple awards won by players ==
The following table lists the number of awards won by players who have won at least two Player of the Season awards.

Players in bold are still active in the Premier League.

Awards	Player	Country	Seasons
2	Thierry Henry	France	2003–04, 2005–06
2	Cristiano Ronaldo	Portugal	2006–07, 2007–08
2	Nemanja Vidić	Serbia	2008–09, 2010–11
2	Kevin De Bruyne	Belgium	2019–20, 2021–22
2	Mohamed Salah	Egypt	2017–18, 2024–25

== Awards won by nationality ==
Country	Players	Total
England	7	7
Belgium	3	4
France	3	4
Portugal	3	4
Netherlands	2	2
Egypt	1	2
Serbia	1	2
Brazil	1	1
Denmark	1	1
Norway	1	1
Sweden	1	1
Trinidad and Tobago	1	1
Uruguay	1	1
Wales	1	1

== Awards won by position ==
Position	Players	Total
Forward	12	15
Midfielder	9	10
Defender	4	5
Goalkeeper	1	1

== Awards won by club ==
Club	Players	Total
Manchester United	7	9
Manchester City	5	6
Liverpool	4	5
Arsenal	3	4
Chelsea	3	3
Leicester City	1	1
Blackburn Rovers	1	1
Middlesbrough	1	1
Sunderland	1	1
Tottenham Hotspur	1	1

== See also ==
- Most Valuable Player
- Premier League Player of the Month
- FWA Footballer of the Year
- PFA Players' Player of the Year
- Premier League Young Player of the Season
- Premier League Manager of the Season
- Premier League Playmaker of the Season
- Premier League Goal of the Season
- Premier League Save of the Season
- Premier League Game Changer of the Season
- Premier League Most Powerful Goal
