= Nagrig =

Village in Gharbia Governorate, Egypt

Nagrig نجريج
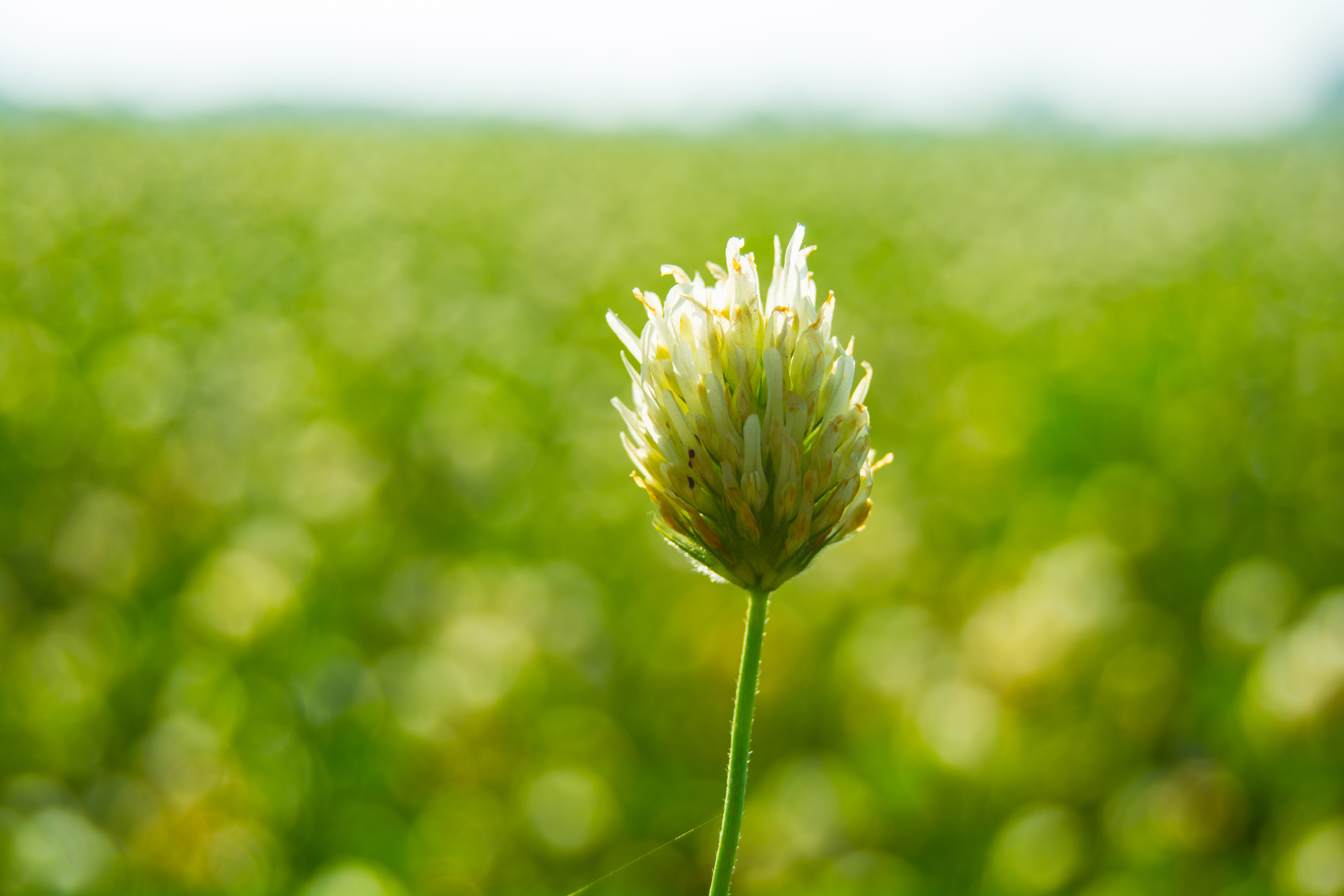
- Clover flowers in Nagrig

- Location in Egypt
- Coordinates: 30°58′21″N 30°52′01″E
- Country: Egypt
- Governorate: Gharbia Governorate

Population (2006)
  - Total: 8,656
- Time zone: UTC+2 (EET)
  - Summer (DST): UTC+3 (EEST)

Nagrig (Egyptian Arabic: نجريج) is a village in Gharbia Governorate, Egypt, near the city of Basyoun.

== History ==
=== Surveys and namings ===
Nagrig is an ancient village, bordering the ancient city of Sais, which belonged to Sap-Meh, the fifth nome of Lower Egypt in Ancient Egypt.

It was also mentioned under its ancient name of "Nagreg" in the region of Gharbia, as part of the survey (ordered during the reign of Saladin in 572/AH 1176 AD) counted by Ibn Mamati in the book "Laws of Collections."

== Population ==
The population of Nagrig was 8,656 people, according to the official census of 2006. A 2018 article interviewing village mayor Maher Shatteh cites the population as "more than 15,000," of which 65% live in poverty.

== Notable people ==
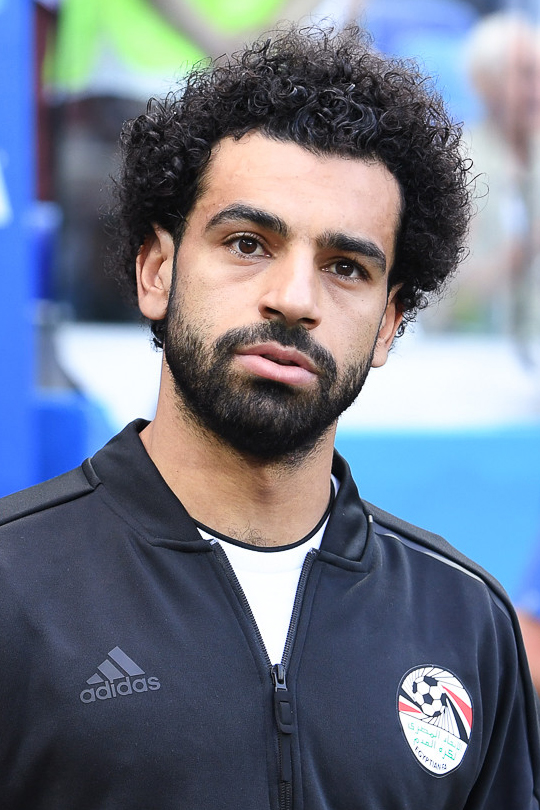
Mohamed Salah in 2018

- Mohamed Salah, footballer for Trabzonspor and the Egypt national team

=== Mohamed Salah's local philanthropy ===
Footballer Mohamed Salah, who grew up in Nagrig, has funded the construction of a primary and middle school, as well as a small stadium in the village. He has also donated money, distributed through his charity, to be given to widows, poor families, and poor Syrian refugees. Salah's foundation also gave Nagrig its first ambulance, as residents must travel to Basyoun for medical treatment.
