= Mohamed Salah =

Egyptian footballer (born 1992)

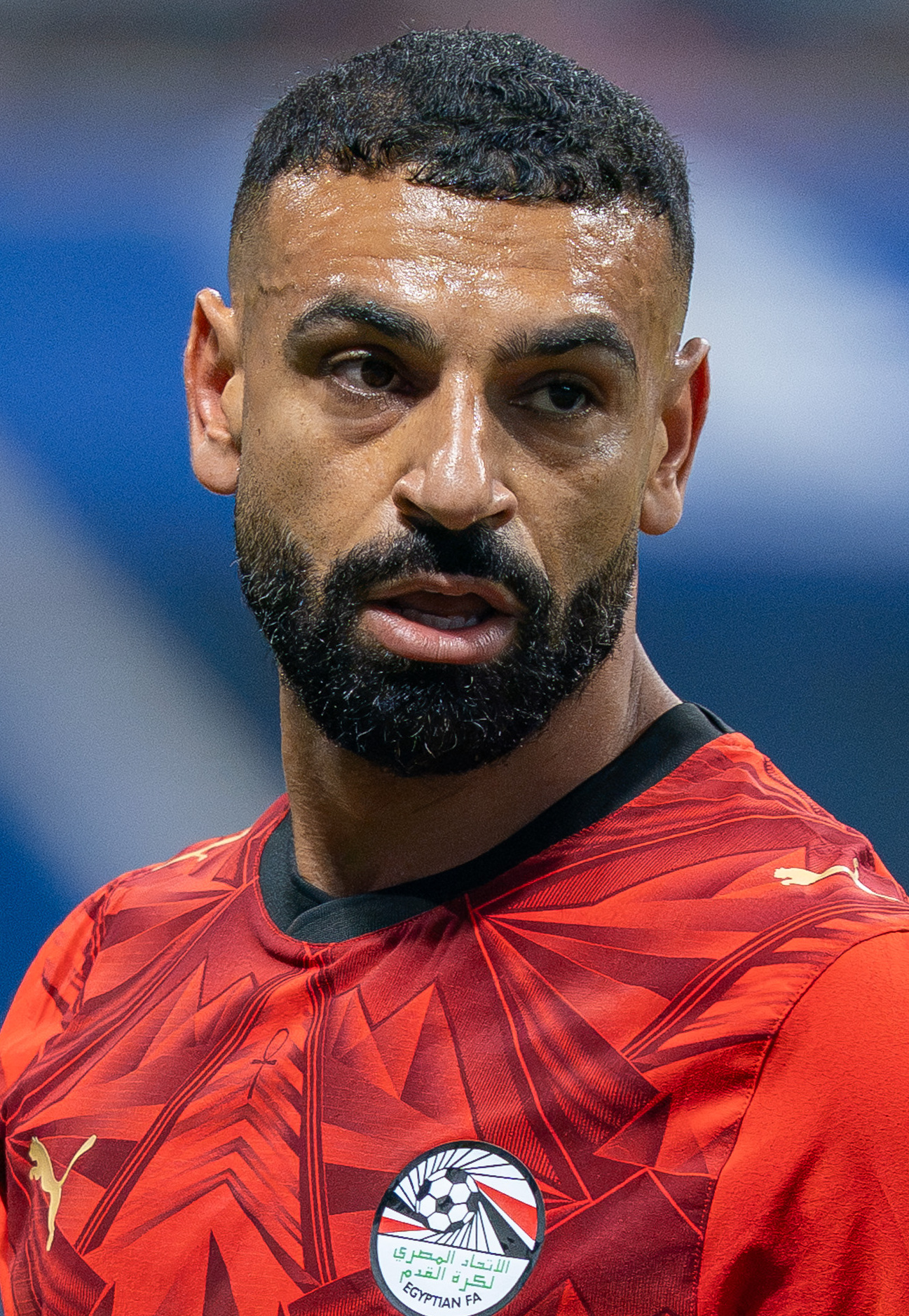
- Salah with Egypt in 2026

Personal information
- Full name: Mohamed Salah Hamed Mahrous Ghaly
- Date of birth: 15 June 1992 (age 34)
- Place of birth: Nagrig, Egypt
- Height: 1.75 m (5 ft 9 in)
- Position: Right winger

Team information
- Current team: Trabzonspor
- Number: 10

Youth career
- 2004–2005: Ittihad Basyoun
- 2005–2006: Othmason Tanta
- 2006–2010: Al-Mokawloon

Senior career*
Years	Team	Apps	(Gls)
2010–2012	Al-Mokawloon	40	(11)
2012–2014	Basel	47	(9)
2014–2016	Chelsea	13	(2)
2015	→ Fiorentina (loan)	16	(6)
2015–2016	→ Roma (loan)	34	(14)
2016–2017	Roma	31	(15)
2017–2026	Liverpool	315	(191)
2026–	Trabzonspor	12	(9)

International career^{‡}
2010–2011	Egypt U20	11	(3)
2011–2012	Egypt U23	11	(4)
2011–	Egypt	124	(70)
Medal record
Men's football
Representing Egypt
Africa Cup of Nations
Runner-up	2017 Gabon
Runner-up	2021 Cameroon
- * Club domestic league appearances and goals as of 18:00, 22 November 2026 (UTC) ‡ National team caps and goals as of 20:01, 17 November 2026 (UTC)

Mohamed Salah Hamed Mahrous Ghaly (Note: Egyptian Arabic: محمد صلاح حامد محروس غالي, Egyptian Arabic pronunciation: [mæˈħæm.mæd sˤɑˈlɑːħ ˈɣæːli]) (born 15 June 1992) is an Egyptian professional footballer who plays as a right winger for Süper Lig club Trabzonspor and captains the Egypt national team. He is widely regarded as one of the best players of his generation and one of the greatest African players of all time. Dubbed the "Egyptian King", he is the all-time top foreign goalscorer in the Premier League, the all-time top African goalscorer in the UEFA Champions League, and the all-time top scorer of the Egypt national team.

Salah began his senior career in 2010 at Al-Mokawloon, departing in 2012 to join Basel, where he won two Swiss Super League titles. In 2014, he joined Chelsea for a reported fee of £11 million, but limited gametime led to successive loans to Fiorentina and Roma, who later signed him permanently for €15 million. In the 2016–17 season, Salah was a key figure in Roma's unsuccessful title bid, reaching double figures in both goals and assists. In 2017, Salah moved to Liverpool for £36.9 million, a club record at the time. In his first season, he set the record for most Premier League goals scored (32) in a 38-game season and helped Liverpool to the 2018 Champions League final. Having formed a formidable attacking trio with Roberto Firmino and Sadio Mané, Salah went on to be an integral player in the club's Champions League and Premier League title successes in the following two seasons. He has since also won the FA Cup, EFL Cup, FA Community Shield, UEFA Super Cup and the FIFA Club World Cup. In the 2024–25 season, he won a second league title while breaking the record for the most goal contributions in a 38-game Premier League campaign. For his performances during the season, he won the PFA Players' Player of the Year award for a record-breaking third time.

Salah's other individual accolades include three FWA Footballer of the Year awards, four Premier League Golden Boots, two Premier League Player of the Season awards, two Premier League Playmaker of the Season awards, finished third for the Best FIFA Men's Player in 2018 and 2021, and finished fourth in the 2025 Ballon d'Or, respectively. In 2023, Salah became Liverpool's all-time top goalscorer in the history of the Premier League, and also became the fifth player to score 200 goals for the club. In 2025, he became Liverpool's third-highest goalscorer in the club's history behind Roger Hunt and Ian Rush. In March 2026, Salah announced that he would leave Liverpool at the end of the 2025–26 season.

At international level, Salah represented Egypt at youth level before making his senior debut in 2011. Following his performances at the 2012 Summer Olympics, he was named CAF Most Promising African Talent of the Year. Since then, he finished as runner-up in the 2017 and 2021 Africa Cup of Nations, and was top scorer during CAF qualification as Egypt qualified for the 2018 FIFA World Cup. Salah was named CAF African Footballer of the Year (2017 and 2018), BBC African Footballer of the Year (2017 and 2018), and was selected in the 2017 Africa Cup of Nations Team of the Tournament, 2021 Africa Cup of Nations Team of the Tournament and the CAF Team of the Year on several occasions. He captained Egypt at the 2026 World Cup, leading the team to its first-ever match victories in the competition as well as its first appearance in the round of 16.

Salah is regarded as a symbol of national pride in Egypt for his achievements and was named in Time magazine's list of the 100 Most Influential People in 2019. Salah has also been credited for raising the profile of Liverpool among Egyptians.

== Early life ==
Mohamed Salah was born on 15 June 1992 in Nagrig, a village in Basyoun, Gharbia Governorate, in the Delta region of Egypt. He grew up in Nagrig, where he developed a passion for football from an early age, playing with his friends in the village streets. He was known to have supported Zamalek SC since childhood.

== Club career ==
=== Al Mokawloon ===
Salah started out playing for the youth setups of local teams Ittihad Basyoun and Othmason Tanta. He names Ronaldo, Zinedine Zidane and Francesco Totti as his childhood idols. In 2006, he joined the youth team of Al Mokawloon Al Arab aged 14 after being spotted by a scout who had originally come to watch another child play but was distracted by Salah. Salah frequently had to miss school to make the three-hour journey to training. When Salah was 15, he was noticed by first-team manager Mohamed Radwan, who moved him to the first-team squad immediately. Salah had to be given a special diet and training program due to his muscles not being fully formed because of his young age.

Salah made his first-team debut on 3 May 2010 in the Egyptian Premier League, coming on as a substitute in a 1–1 away draw against El Mansoura. During the 2010–11 season Salah continued earning minutes on the pitch, eventually becoming a regular in the team. Even though he was getting regular game time, Salah struggled to score. In the dressing room after matches, he would sometimes be in tears because of this, and Radwan says it only motivated him to become better. He scored his first goal for them on 25 December 2010 in a 1–1 away draw against Al Ahly. He remained a regular for Al Mokawloon, appearing in every game of the 2011–12 season. Following the Port Said Stadium riot on 1 February 2012, the Egyptian Premier League was suspended, and on 10 March, the Egyptian Football Association announced their decision to cancel the remainder of the season.

=== Basel ===
==== 2012–2013: Development and breakthrough ====
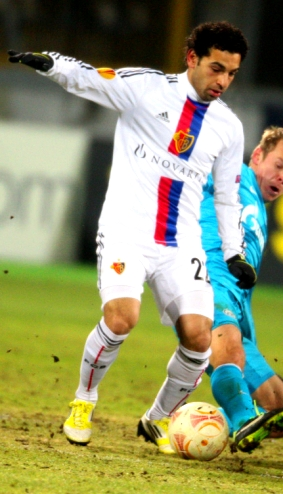
Salah playing for Basel away at Zenit Saint Petersburg in the UEFA Europa League in March 2013

Swiss Super League club Basel had been monitoring Salah for some time, so following the Egyptian Premier League suspension, the club organised a friendly match with the Egypt national under-23 team. The match took place on 16 March at the Stadion Rankhof in Basel, and despite only playing the second half, Salah scored twice, helping the Egyptians to a 4–3 win. Basel subsequently invited Salah to remain in the city for a week's training. On 10 April 2012, it was announced that Salah had signed for Basel on a four-year contract starting from 15 June 2012. He initially found it difficult to settle, having arrived unable to speak the language and been signed as a replacement for Xherdan Shaqiri. Salah scored on his unofficial debut on 23 June 2012 against FCSB during a friendly match, a 4–2 defeat. He made his official Basel debut in a UEFA Champions League preliminary stage match against the Norwegian club Molde on 8 August, coming on as a substitute in the 74th minute. He made his league debut on 12 August against Thun, playing the full match.

He scored his first league goal a week later, the second goal in a 2–0 home win against Lausanne-Sport. Salah scored his first UEFA Europa League goal in the quarter-finals on 11 April 2013, as Basel advanced to the semi-finals by beating Tottenham Hotspur 4–1 in a penalty shoot-out after a 4–4 aggregate draw. In the semi-final on 2 May, Salah scored away to Chelsea, although Basel were beaten 5–2 on aggregate. Despite late disappointment in Europe, Basel won the 2012–13 Swiss Super League title and finished runners-up in the Swiss Cup.

==== 2013–2014: Final season and league championship ====
Ahead of the 2013–14 Swiss Super League season, Salah was a member of the Basel team that won the 2013 Uhrencup. Salah scored in his first league appearance of the season against Aarau on 13 July 2013. He scored his first Champions League goal a month later against Maccabi Tel Aviv on 6 August 2013 in the third qualifying round. Salah was the subject of major controversy following the game, after he appeared to deliberately avoid shaking hands with the players of the Israeli club in both the home and away legs.

He scored twice against the Bulgarian league champions Ludogorets Razgrad on 21 August 2013 in the play-off round. On 18 September 2013, Salah scored the equaliser against Chelsea in the 2–1 away win during the group stage. During the return tie on 26 November at St. Jakob-Park, Salah scored the winning goal as Basel beat Chelsea for the second time with a 1–0 home win. However, he was unable to prevent Basel being eliminated in the group stage.

On the domestic stage, Salah continued to perform. Scoring four goals in 18 games, including a double against title rivals Young Boys, he helped Basel win the league title for the fifth time in a row.

On 23 January 2014, it was announced that Salah would leave Basel. During his time with the club, Salah played a total of 79 games for Basel, scoring a total of 20 goals. 47 of these games were in the Swiss Super League, six in the Swiss Cup, and 26 in UEFA competitions (Champions League and Europa League). He scored nine goals in the domestic league, four in the cup, and seven in European matches.

=== Chelsea ===
==== 2014 ====
On 23 January 2014, Premier League club Chelsea announced that a deal had been agreed with Basel to sign Salah for a fee reported to be in the region of £11 million. Three days later the transfer was completed, making him the first Egyptian to sign for the London-based club. Liverpool had been interested in Salah, and had made an offer of £11 million but were beaten to his signature by Chelsea.

On 8 February, Salah made his debut for Chelsea in the Premier League, coming on as a substitute in the 3–0 win over Newcastle United. Seven games later, on 22 March, Salah scored his first goal for Chelsea against Arsenal in the London derby, coming on as a substitute for Oscar, in a match which ended as a 6–0 home win. Then, on 5 April, Salah opened the scoring and later won a penalty and assisted the third goal in Chelsea's 3–0 win over Stoke City.

==== 2014–2015 ====
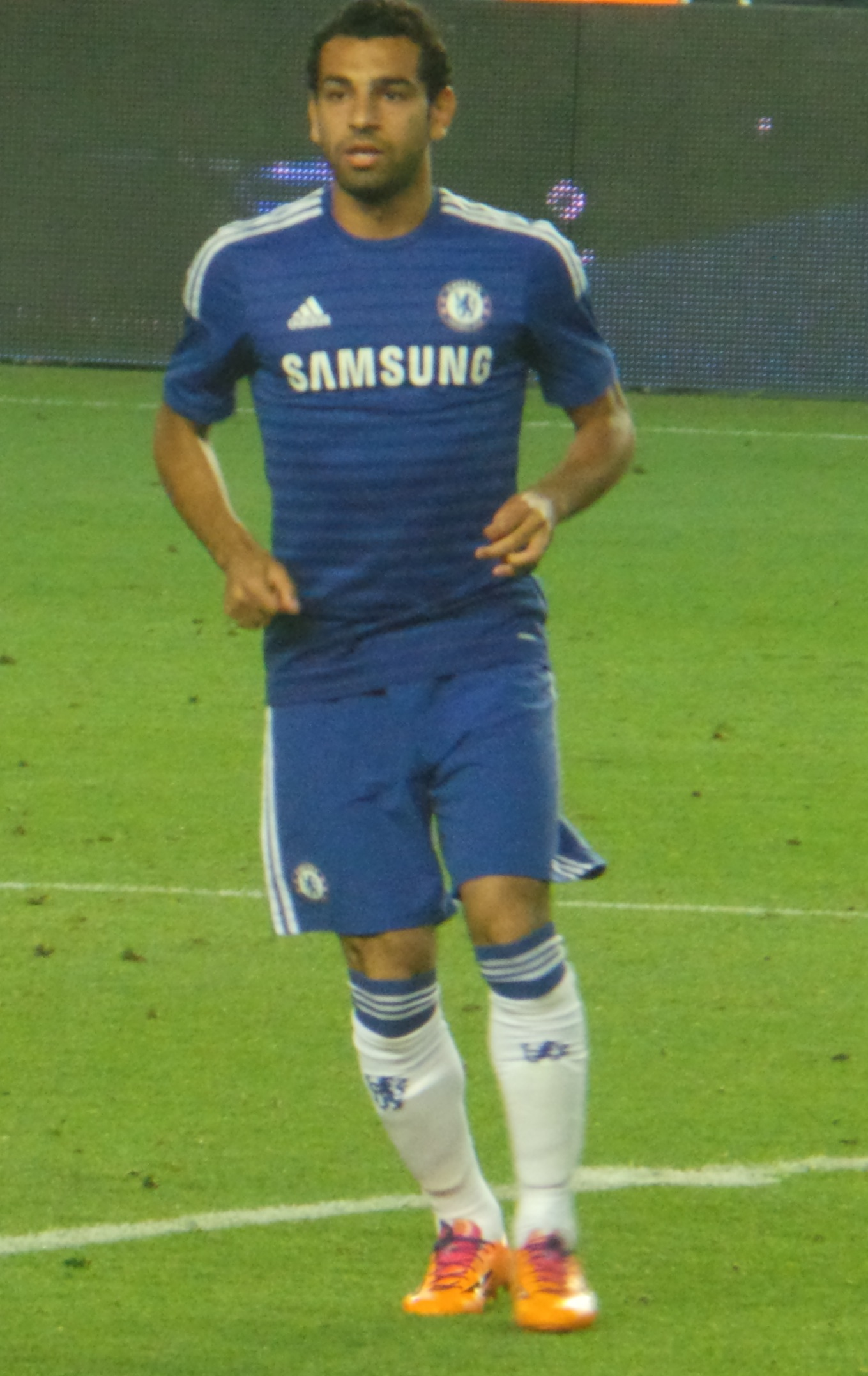
Salah playing for Chelsea in August 2014

Before the 2014–15 season, Salah's future with Chelsea looked to be in doubt after reports suggested he could be forced to return to Egypt to carry out military service after his registration for an education scheme was rescinded by the Egyptian Minister of Higher Education. He was spared from military service after a meeting with Egyptian prime minister Ibrahim Mahlab, the Minister of Higher Education, and the Egypt national team manager Shawky Gharieb. Salah changed squad numbers from 15 to 17 for the start of the season, with his new number having been vacated by Eden Hazard changing to number 10.

Salah was rarely used during the season, making just three Premier League, two Champions League and three cup appearances, failing to score in any of them. On 28 October 2014, after a poor performance in a 2–1 win away to League Two team Shrewsbury Town in the fourth round of the League Cup, he and fellow winger André Schürrle were criticised publicly by manager José Mourinho. Although Salah only made three league appearances before his loan move to Fiorentina, Mourinho stated that he would receive a replica winner's medal from the club for his contributions that season.

==== 2015: Loan to Fiorentina ====
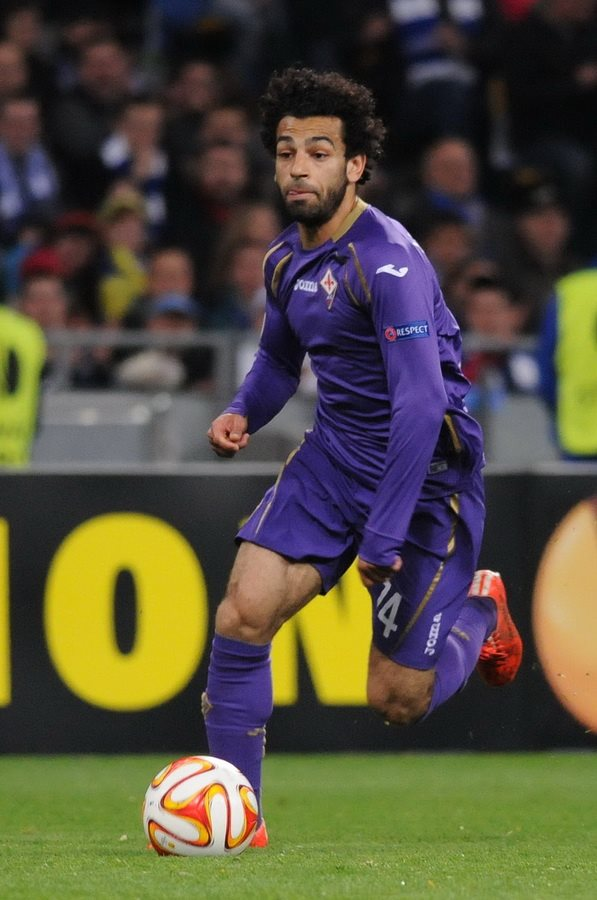
Salah playing for Fiorentina against Dynamo Kyiv in the Europa League in 2015

On the transfer deadline day, 2 February 2015, Chelsea confirmed that Salah would join Italian club Fiorentina on an 18-month loan until the end of the 2015–16 season, as part of a transfer deal which saw Juan Cuadrado moving in the opposite direction. Six days after signing, he made his debut coming off the bench in the 65th minute as a replacement for Joaquín in a 3–2 home victory against Atalanta in Serie A. Salah chose the number 74 shirt in honour of the victims of the Port Said Stadium riot.

Salah made his first start for Fiorentina on 14 February against Sassuolo, scoring his first goal for the club in the 30th minute. He then provided an assist to Khouma Babacar just two minutes after scoring; the match ended in a 3–1 win for Fiorentina. Twelve days later, Salah scored his first European goal for Fiorentina, as his side advanced to the round of sixteen of the Europa League, beating Tottenham 3–1 on aggregate. Salah scored the winning goal for Fiorentina against Inter Milan on 1 March, his third goal in Serie A. Four days after that, Salah scored both of Fiorentina's goals in their 2–1 win away to Juventus in the Coppa Italia semi-final first leg. At the end of the season, Fiorentina activated an option to make the loan move permanent, but Salah refused the move. Even though the loan agreement was for 18 months, Salah refused to return to Fiorentina and instead joined fellow Serie A club Roma. On 11 September, Fiorentina filed a complaint to FIFA, claiming that Chelsea had breached the agreed contract when they allowed Salah to join Roma on loan. The Court of Arbitration for Sport cleared Salah and Chelsea of any wrongdoing.

==== 2015–2016: Loan to Roma ====
On 6 August 2015, Salah joined Roma on a season-long loan for €5 million; with the option to make the deal permanent, for a reported €15 million. He wore the number 11 shirt. He made his debut on 22 August, as the new season began with a 1–1 draw away Hellas Verona. On 20 September, Salah scored his first goal of the season against Sassuolo to help Roma salvage a point as the match ended in a 2–2 draw. He went on to score in his following two matches, a 2–1 loss against Sampdoria and a 5–1 win against Carpi. On 25 October, Salah scored the opener against his former club Fiorentina in a 2–1 away victory to help earn a fourth straight league win for Roma. On his return, Salah was also sent off after picking up a second yellow in the closing minutes of the match, just seconds after picking up his first yellow. On 4 November, he scored the opening goal of a 3–2 Champions League win over Bayer Leverkusen.

On 4 March, he faced his former side Fiorentina again and scored another double as Roma won 4–1 and broke into the top three. Salah would go onto score another three goals that season, scoring against Bologna, Genoa and Milan, the latter on the final day. In the 2015–16 season, Salah scored 15 goals in 42 matches as Roma finished in third place in Serie A and qualified for the Champions League. In June, it was announced that Salah won the club's 2015–16 Player of the Season award.

=== Roma ===
==== 2016–2017: Permanent transfer, Serie A runner-up ====
On 3 August 2016, Roma announced the signing of Salah on a permanent deal for €15 million. He scored his first goal of the season in a 4–0 win over Udinese in the opening game of the season on 20 August. On 6 November, Salah scored a hat-trick in a 3–0 win over Bologna, his first club career hat-trick. However, a ruptured ankle ligament kept him out for the first half of December. He returned as a half-time substitute in a 1–0 defeat against title rivals Juventus on 17 December. Salah then endured a two-month period without a goal, he broke his drought on 19 February, scoring against Torino in a 4–1 win. On 9 March, he scored Roma's opening goal in an eventual 4–2 defeat to Lyon in the first leg of the round of sixteen in the 2016–17 Europa League. Despite winning the second leg 2–1, they were unable to turn the tie around and were knocked out 5–4 on aggregate. On 28 May, in the final game of the season, Salah was substituted for captain Francesco Totti, who was playing his final game with the club, in a 3–2 win over Genoa. Roma finished the season in second, just four points behind champions Juventus. Salah scored 19 goals in all competitions.

=== Liverpool ===
==== 2017–2018: Record-breaking individual success ====
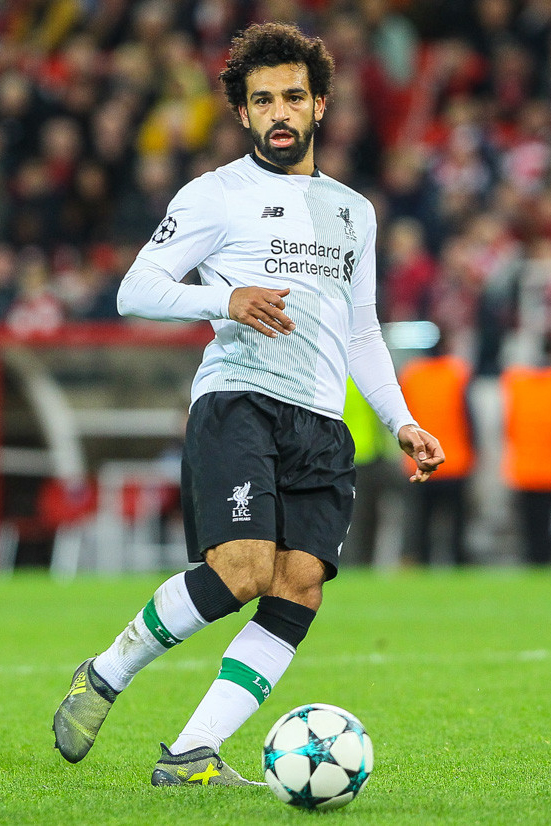
Salah playing for Liverpool in 2017. His performances in the 2017–18 season saw him receive numerous accolades, including PFA Players' Player of the Year and the Football Writers' Player of the Year.

On 22 June 2017, Salah agreed a transfer to Premier League club Liverpool. He signed a long-term contract with the Reds for an initial £36.5m fee that could rise to £43m. The fee was a club record, eclipsing the £35m spent on Andy Carroll in 2011. He was assigned the number 11 shirt previously worn by Roberto Firmino, who instead switched to number 9. He joined the club on 1 July upon the opening of the summer transfer window, becoming Liverpool's first Egyptian player, and scored on his Premier League debut against Watford in a 3–3 away draw on 12 August. On 24 August, Salah scored his second goal for Liverpool, in a 2017–18 Champions League play-off round 4–2 win (6–3 agg) against 1899 Hoffenheim, his first goal at Anfield. Three days later, Salah scored and assisted a goal in a 4–0 victory over Arsenal. For his performances in August, Salah was awarded Player of the Month by Liverpool supporters. On 17 October, Salah netted twice in a 7–0 Champions League win over Maribor, helping Liverpool to the joint-largest ever away win in the competition, and the largest away win by an English club.

"What a season. And more to come in the Champions League and World Cup. It's been great to watch you."

— Pelé to Salah on his record-breaking 2017–18 season.

On 26 November 2017, Salah scored the opener and refused to celebrate in a 1–1 home draw with his former team Chelsea out of respect for the club, as well as victims of the Sinai mosque attack two days earlier. Salah rose the top of the Premier League goalscoring charts by scoring twice after coming on as a substitute away at Stoke City on 29 November in a 3–0 win. The following month, Salah netted in a 4–0 win over Bournemouth; a result which saw Liverpool become the first team in Premier League history to win four consecutive away league matches by a margin of at least three goals. In the process, he also became the joint-second fastest player to reach 20 goals for Liverpool on his 26th appearance, behind George Allan who reached the milestone in 19 appearances in 1895. On 17 March 2018, Salah scored four goals in a 5–0 win over Watford, which was his first hat-trick for Liverpool. In this game, he also broke a record of scoring 36 times in his debut season for Liverpool, and also became the leading goalscorer in Europe's top five leagues – overtaking Barcelona's Lionel Messi and Tottenham striker Harry Kane. Following Salah's record-breaking goal exploits, former Liverpool captain Steven Gerrard stated that "we are witnessing the start of greatness".

In early April 2018, he scored in both Champions League quarter-final matches against Manchester City to help his side advance. On 22 April 2018, Salah was awarded the PFA Players' Player of the Year award, having earlier been named in the PFA Team of the Year for the Premier League. Two days later, he scored a brace in a 5–2 Champions League semi-final first leg win over former club, Roma. In doing so, he simultaneously became the first player from Africa and the first Liverpool player to score ten goals in a single campaign in the tournament. His double also took him to 43 goals for the season across all competitions, surpassing Roger Hunt's tally of 42, and making him Liverpool's second-highest goalscorer in a single season, behind Ian Rush. He had previously also broken the club's record for the Premier League era, surpassing Robbie Fowler's total of 36 goals set in the 1995–96 campaign, and Fernando Torres' record of 33 for the most goals by a Liverpool player in a debut season. After his two goals and assists in the first leg against Roma, Salah featured in the second leg as Liverpool beat the Italian club 7–6 on aggregate to qualify for the final for the first time in eleven years. He would then become the Premier League's all-time goalscorer for a 38-game season, registering his 32nd league goal in a 4–0 win against Brighton & Hove Albion en route to being awarded the Premier League Golden Boot.

In the 2018 Champions League final against Real Madrid, Salah injured his left shoulder in the 30th minute after a challenge by Madrid defender Sergio Ramos. After initially carrying on, he left the field in tears after going to ground again; the match ended in a 3–1 defeat. The Egyptian FA stated that this would have no effect on his availability for the 2018 FIFA World Cup in Russia, and that Salah would still be named in the team's final squad on 4 June. The day after the match, Ramos wrote a message and sent him good wishes.

==== 2018–2019: European champion and second Golden Boot ====
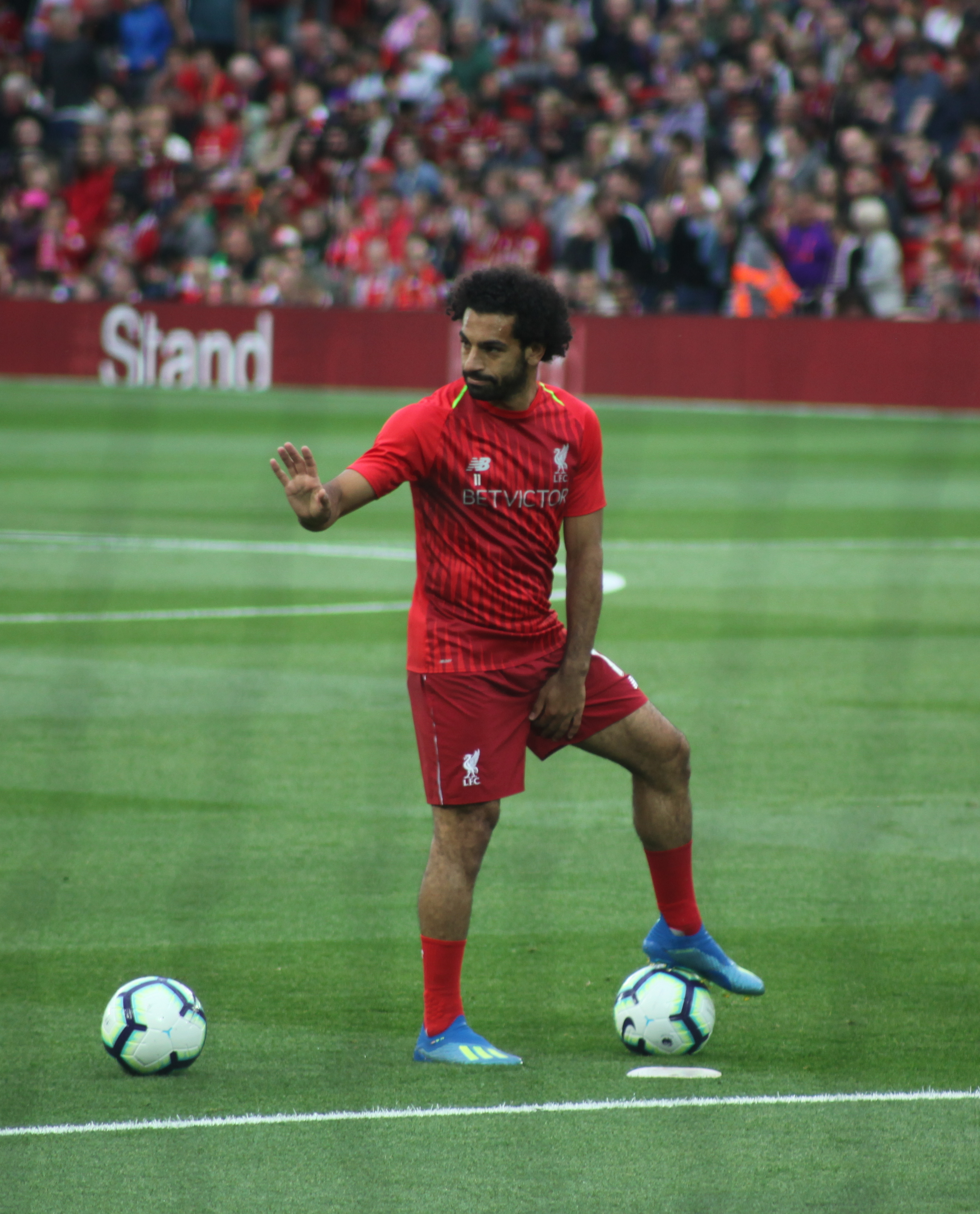
Salah during a warm-up ahead of a pre-season match on 7 August 2018

On 2 July 2018, Salah signed a new long-term contract with Liverpool. Manager Jürgen Klopp said the news was important as a statement of intent in terms of Liverpool's status in the football world in having Salah commit himself further to the club. On 12 August, Salah scored Liverpool's first goal of the season, in a 4–0 home win over West Ham United. On 30 August, Salah was named on the three-man shortlist for the UEFA Men's Player of the Year, coming in third place, and was also included on the three-man shortlist for the UEFA Forward of the Season, coming in second place. On 3 September, he was named on the three-man shortlist for the Best FIFA Men's Player, finishing third. Salah controversially received the 2018 FIFA Puskás Award for goal of the year, the winning strike being his goal at Anfield in his first Merseyside derby, prompting online protests against the decision. On 24 October, Salah scored twice against Red Star Belgrade in the 2018–19 Champions League group stage, with his second goal his 50th for the club. With 50 goals in 65 games, he is the fastest player in Liverpool history to reach the half century.

On 3 December, Salah was ranked in sixth place at the 2018 Ballon d'Or ceremony, as a recognition for his performances with club and country throughout 2018. On 8 December, Salah scored a hat-trick in a 4–0 away win over Bournemouth, to move Liverpool to the top of the league table. Three days later, he scored the winning goal in a 1–0 win over Napoli in their final Champions League group fixture, the result qualifying Liverpool to the round of sixteen. On 19 January 2019, he scored his 50th Premier League goal with a brace in a 4–3 win over Crystal Palace, reaching the tally in 72 appearances. In doing so, he became the joint-fourth fastest player to achieve the milestone, alongside Fernando Torres, and behind only Andy Cole, Alan Shearer and Ruud van Nistelrooy.

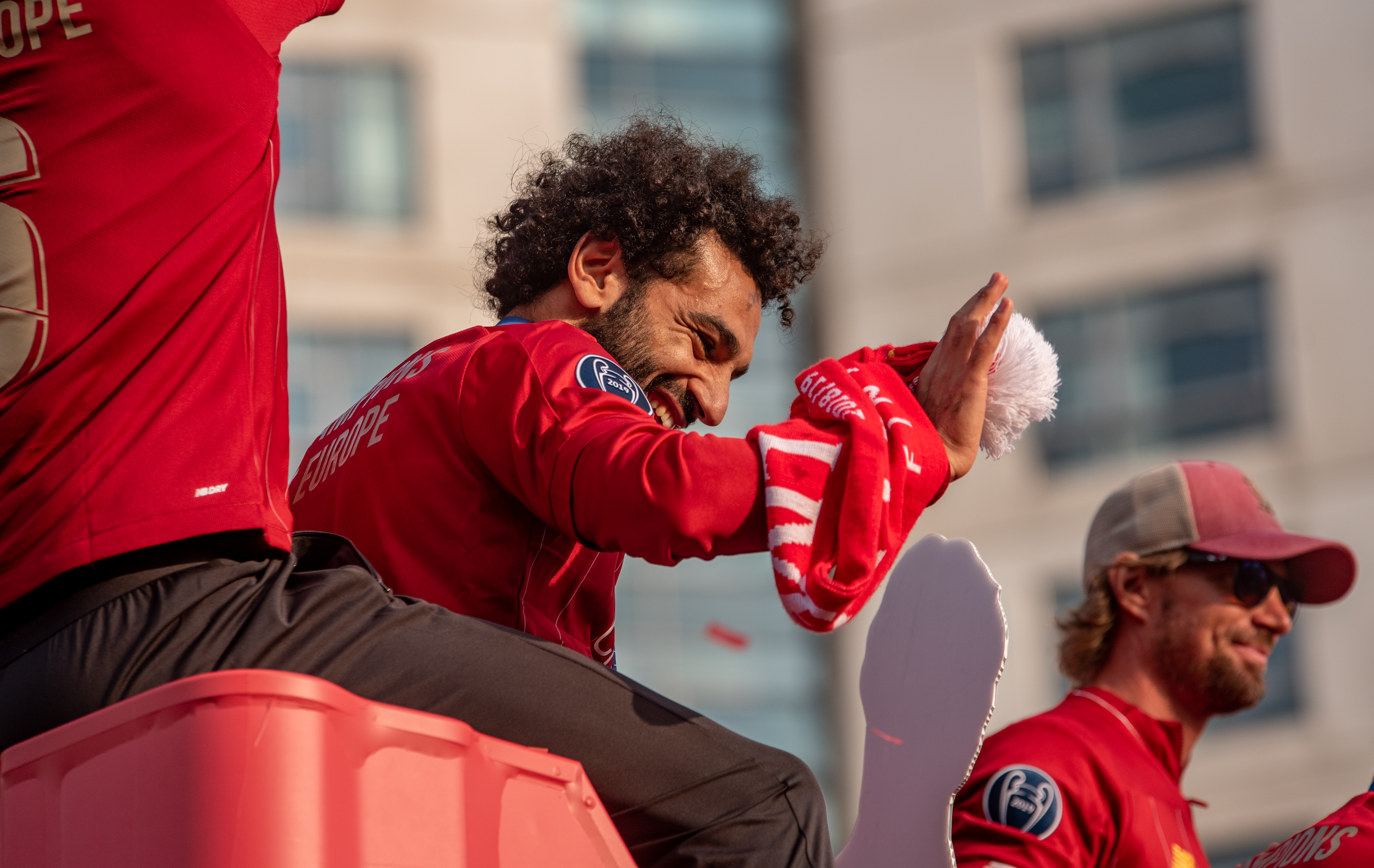
Salah at the Champions League trophy parade in Liverpool on 2 June 2019, the day after the final

In February 2019, West Ham said they were investigating a video which allegedly showed fans racially abusing Salah, including for being Muslim. The investigation resulted in the fan being banned for three years. On 5 April, he scored his 50th Premier League goal for Liverpool in a 3–1 win over Southampton and in the process broke Torres' record to become the fastest player to reach the milestone for the club, doing so in his 69th appearance. It also saw him become the third fastest player to reach the milestone for a single club in the Premier League era, behind Shearer for Blackburn Rovers, in 66 appearances, and Van Nistelrooy for Manchester United, in 68. Later that month, he scored the second goal, a powerful strike from 25 yards out that flew into the top corner, in a 2–0 win over Chelsea which helped Liverpool earn a club-record-equaling 26th win for the Premier League campaign; and the club's second-highest ever wins return in the top flight after the record of 30 set in 1979. On 26 April, he made his 100th appearance for Liverpool and broke the record jointly held by Roger Hunt and Sam Raybould for the player with the most goals in his first century of appearances for the club, netting twice in a 5–0 win over Huddersfield Town to take his tally to 69.

"I have sacrificed a lot for my career, to come from a village to go to Cairo, and to be an Egyptian at this level is unbelievable for me."

— Salah after winning the 2019 UEFA Champions League final.

On 1 June, after missing the semi-final due to injury, Salah scored Liverpool's first goal in a 2–0 win over Tottenham in the 2019 Champions League final from a penalty. The goal, which he scored in the opening two minutes of the match, was the second fastest goal ever scored in a Champions League final, slower only than Paolo Maldini's effort for Milan against Liverpool in the 2005 final. In September 2019, Salah was nominated for the FIFPRO World 11 award by worldwide players' union FIFPRO, and FIFA, as one of 55 players.

==== 2019–2020: Premier League champion ====
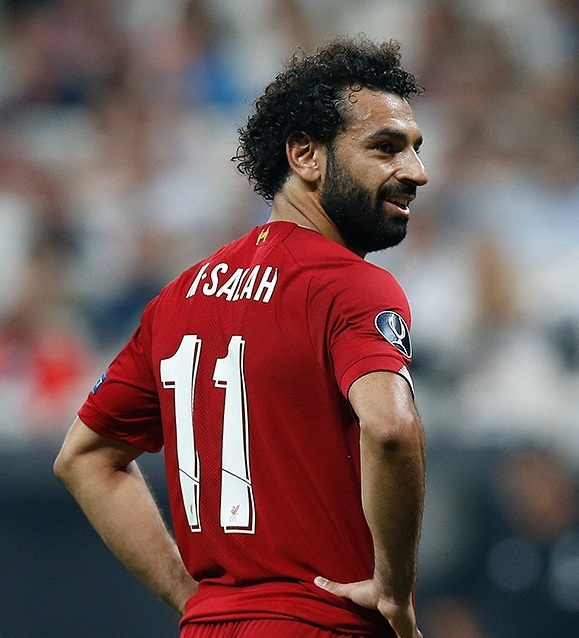
Salah playing for Liverpool in the 2019 UEFA Super Cup

On 9 August 2019, Salah scored Liverpool's second goal in a 4–1 win against Norwich City in the opening game of the 2019–20 Premier League season. In the 2019 UEFA Super Cup on 14 August, Salah scored Liverpool's fifth and ultimately decisive penalty in a 5–4 penalty shoot-out win against Chelsea, after the game had finished 2–2 after extra time. In December, Salah ended fifth in the voting polls for the 2019 Ballon d'Or, and made his 100th Premier League appearance later in the month, marking the occasion with a goal and assist in Liverpool's 3–0 win over Bournemouth. Later that month, Liverpool won the 2019 FIFA Club World Cup, with Salah receiving the Golden Ball award for Player of the Tournament.

On 19 January 2020, Salah scored his first goal in five encounters against rivals Manchester United, with a run that spanned from outside his box to the other goal in Liverpool's 2–0 home win in the Premier League. On 29 January, Salah scored Liverpool's opening goal in a 2–0 away win against West Ham, a victory that saw the club beat every team in a Premier League season – the first time in the club's 127-year history that they had accomplished it in the top flight. On 7 March, Salah scored the opening goal in a 2–1 win against Bournemouth as Liverpool made it an English top-flight record of 22 consecutive home wins. It was also his 70th Premier League goal in 100 appearances for Liverpool, meaning that he had scored seven more goals than the previous best in their first 100 league games for the club (63 goals by Fernando Torres). Salah's 20th of the season saw him become the first Liverpool player to score 20 goals in all competitions in three consecutive seasons since Michael Owen between 2000–01 and 2002–03. On 24 June 2020, he scored as Liverpool beat Crystal Palace 4–0 at home, as the team edged closer to securing the title. After Liverpool being confirmed as champions, Salah would go on to score a further two goals (both against Brighton) before lifting the Premier League trophy after a 5–3 victory over Chelsea.

==== 2020–2021: 100th Liverpool goal and more records ====
On 12 September 2020, Salah scored a hat-trick in the first league match of a season, including two penalties, in a 4–3 win against Leeds United. Hence, he became the first Liverpool player to score in four consecutive league openers from the 2017–18 to 2020–21 seasons, and the second man in Premier League history, after Teddy Sheringham from the 1992–93 to 1995–96 seasons. He also became the first player to score a hat-trick for Liverpool in the first league match since John Aldridge achieved this feat in the 1988–89 season. On 17 October 2020, he scored his 100th goal for Liverpool in all competitions in a 2–2 away draw against Everton. In scoring his 100th goal in his 159th game, Salah became the first player since Steven Gerrard in 2008 to reach the milestone, and the third fastest in Liverpool's history after Roger Hunt (100 goals in 144 games), and Jack Parkinson (153 games). Salah is the fastest to reach 100 goals for Liverpool while scoring purely in England's top flight, given that both Hunt and Parkinson scored some of their goals for Liverpool in the Football League Second Division.

On 31 January 2021, Salah scored two goals against West Ham and became the fifth Liverpool player to score more than 20 goals in all competitions in four consecutive seasons, and the first since Ian Rush did so six times running from 1981 to 1982 to 1986–87. In addition, his goal in the 68th minute that game was later voted as Premier League Goal of the Month. On 24 April, he scored in a 1–1 draw with Newcastle United, to become the first Liverpool player to score 20 goals in three different Premier League campaigns. On 13 May, he scored a goal in a 4–2 away win over Manchester United, to be his team's first away win at Old Trafford since March 2014. Moreover, he also became the only player to score at Old Trafford for Liverpool in two different games in a season, having scored twice in a 3–2 defeat in the FA Cup, since Harry Chambers in the 1920–21 season.

==== 2021–2022: Third Golden Boot and Playmaker of the Season ====
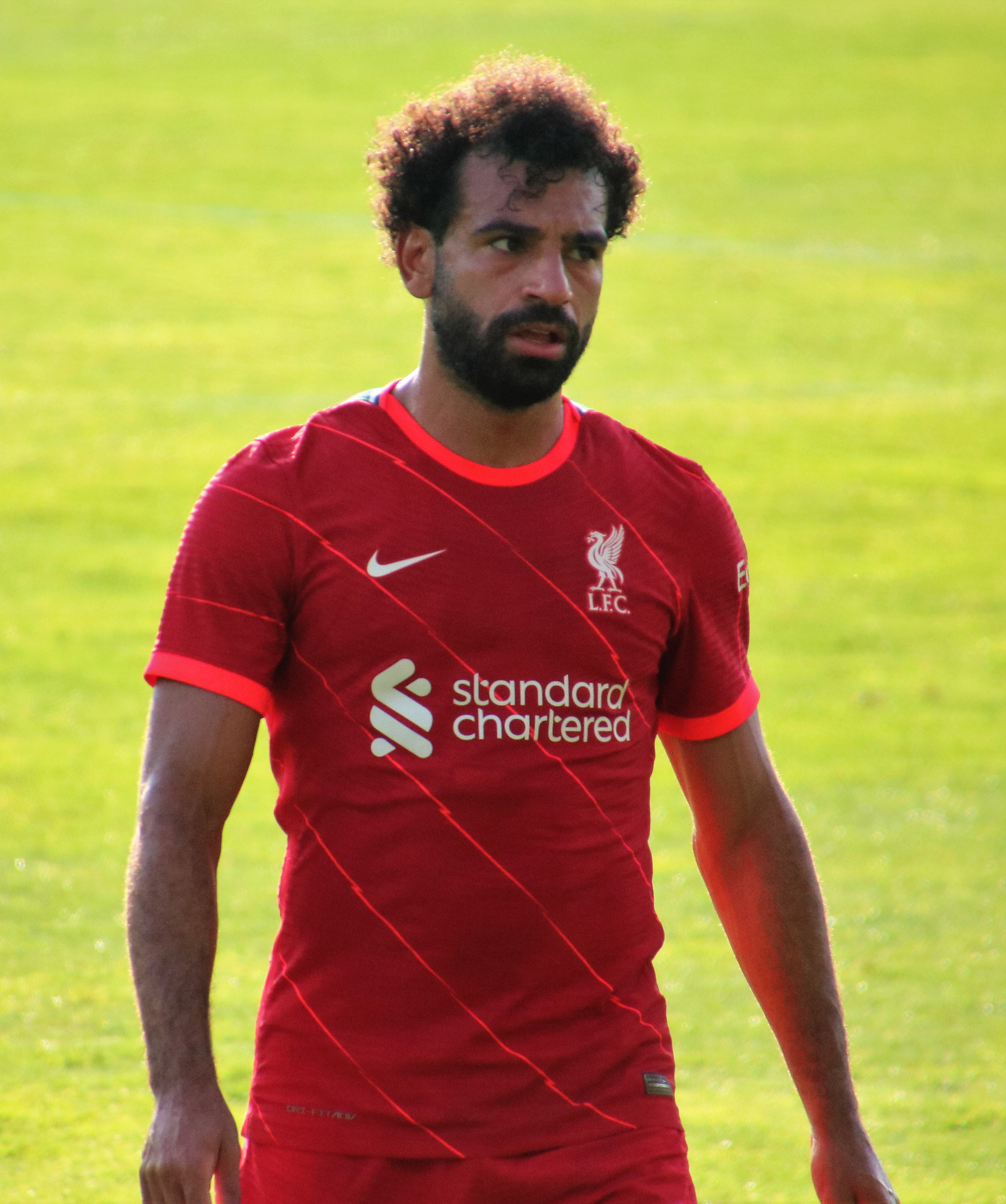
Salah during a pre-season game for Liverpool in 2021

Salah opened the 2021–22 season with a goal and two assists in a 3–0 win away to Norwich, becoming the first player to score in the opening game of five consecutive Premier League seasons. On 12 September, Salah scored his 100th Premier League goal in the 3–0 win away to Leeds United. On 25 September, Salah scored his 100th Premier League goal for Liverpool in a 3–3 draw away to Brentford. Reaching 100 top-flight goals in fewer games than any player in Liverpool history, he achieved the milestone in 151 games, one game fewer than Roger Hunt who reached a century of goals in 152 games. The goal also moved Salah into Liverpool's top 10 all-time scorers list.

"We don't have to talk about what Messi and Ronaldo have done for world football and their dominance. But right now, he [Salah] is the best. I see him every day. There are people like Lewandowski and Ronaldo and Messi and Mbappé, but at this moment for sure he's on top of that list."

— Liverpool manager Jürgen Klopp praising Salah after Liverpool's win against Watford in the Premier League

On 19 October 2021, Salah became the first player in Liverpool history to score in nine consecutive games with two goals in a 3–2 win away to Atlético Madrid in the Champions League. His second goal, his 31st in the Champions League, saw him become Liverpool's record goalscorer in the competition, surpassing the 30 goals scored by Steven Gerrard. In his next game on 24 October, Salah continued breaking records with a hat-trick against Liverpool's arch rivals Manchester United in a 5–0 away victory. By scoring a hat-trick, Salah became the highest scoring African player in Premier League history (surpassing the 104 goals scored by Didier Drogba), and the first Liverpool player to score in ten consecutive games as well as the first Liverpool player to score at Old Trafford three games in a row. He also became the first opposition player to score a hat-trick at Old Trafford since Ronaldo in 2003, and the first to do so in Premier League history. On 3 October 2021, Salah scored a goal against Manchester City after dribbling through their defence. The goal was later named the Premier League Goal of the Month and the Premier League Goal of the Season for 2021–22. On 29 November, Salah was voted in seventh place for the Ballon d'Or ceremony. He stated: "It shocked me, but there's nothing I can say… No one in the world expected that I would be seventh, but that's what happened". Salah also hinted that prejudice against his Egyptian nationality may have hindered him in the ranking. On 1 December, Salah scored twice in a 4–1 away win against Everton in the Premier League as Liverpool became the first team in English top-flight history to score at least two goals in 18 successive games in all competitions.

On 7 December 2021, Salah scored Liverpool's opening goal in a 2–1 away win against Milan at the San Siro, as Liverpool became the first English club to win all six Champions League group games in the competition's history. The goal was Salah's 20th of the season and he became the first Liverpool player since Ian Rush to score 20 goals in five successive seasons. On 16 December, Salah scored Liverpool's second goal in a 3–1 home win against Newcastle United, the 15th consecutive Premier League game he either scored or made an assist, in what was Liverpool's 2,000th top-flight win. On 19 February 2022, Salah became the tenth player to score 150 goals in all competitions for the club, and the second fastest (232 matches) after Roger Hunt (226), when he scored the second goal in a 3–1 Premier League win over Norwich at Anfield. On 19 April, Salah became the first Premier League Player to score five goals against Manchester United in a single season after scoring a brace in a 4–0 win at Anfield. On 29 April, Salah was named England's Men's Footballer of the Year for the second time since 2018. On 22 May, Salah was awarded his third Golden Boot award at the end of the Premier League season, sharing the award with Son Heung-min after both players scored 23 goals. Salah also won the Playmaker of the Season award after collecting 13 assists. Salah earned a runner-up medal in the 2021–22 Champions League, losing the final to Real Madrid. Liverpool narrowly missed out on the chance to achieve a historic quadruple, coming second in the Premier League and the Champions League but winning both the EFL Cup and the FA Cup.

==== 2022–2023: Contract extension and European records ====
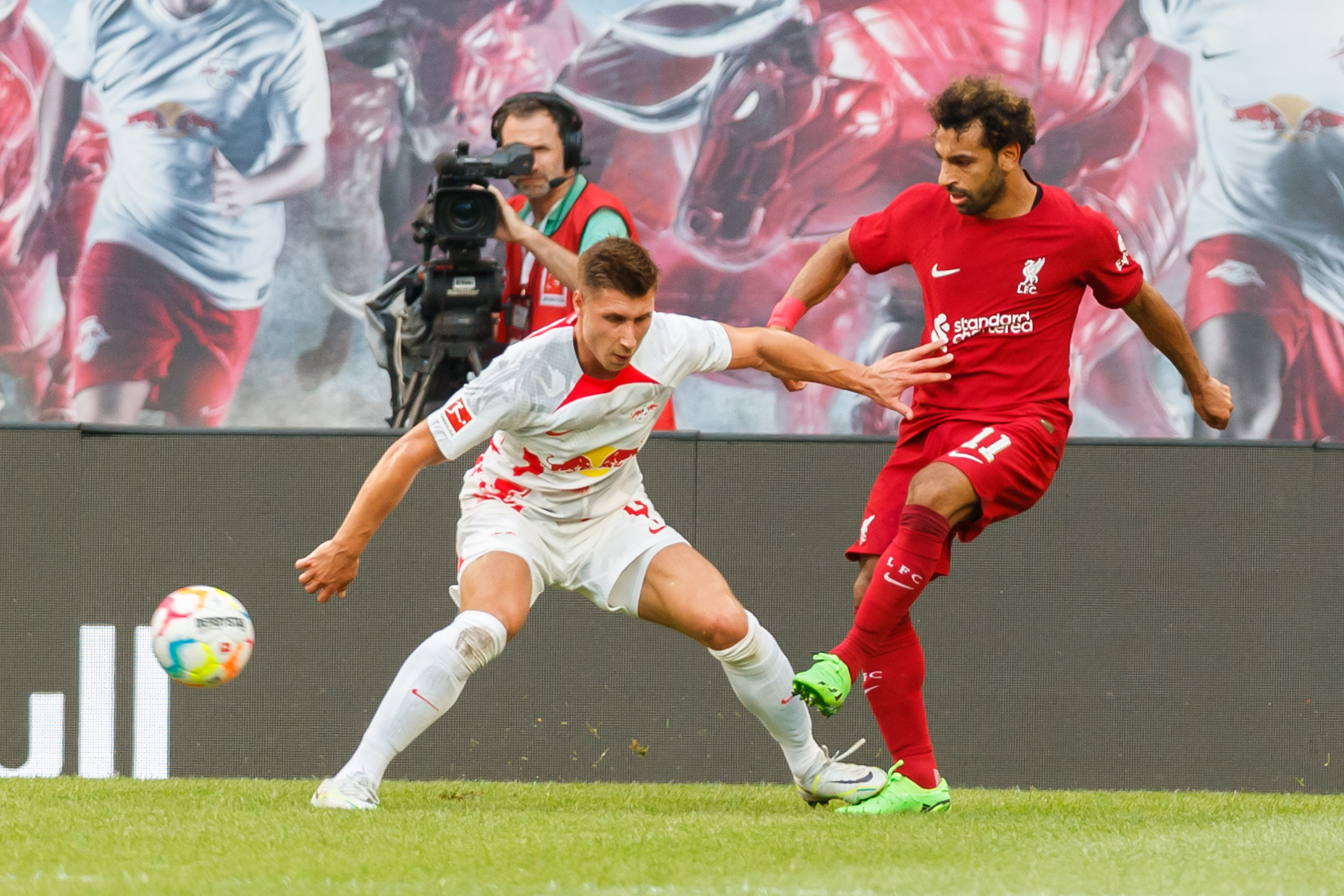
Salah (right) playing for Liverpool in 2022 against RB Leipzig

On 1 July 2022, Salah signed a new contract with Liverpool, lasting until at least 2025. On 30 July, Salah scored a penalty and assisted a goal in a 3–1 FA Community Shield victory against Manchester City. On 6 August, Salah began the new Premier League campaign by scoring one goal and assisting another in a 2–2 draw away at Fulham. With his eighth goal in Premier League opening matches, he became the first player to score on the opening day six seasons in a row, and equalled the record of total goals on opening days set by Wayne Rooney, Frank Lampard and Alan Shearer. On 12 October, Salah came off the bench in a Champions League match away to Rangers, before scoring three goals in the space of six minutes and twelve seconds of an eventual 7–1 win. This saw him break Bafétimbi Gomis' record for the fastest Champions League hat-trick of all time. With 38 goals, he also became the highest goalscorer for an English side, beating out Didier Drogba and Sergio Agüero. On 17 October, Salah was voted in fifth place for the Ballon d'Or ceremony.

On 7 January 2023, Salah surpassed Kenny Dalglish for sixth place on the club's all-time top scorers' list, taking his tally for the club to 173 in 280 matches, when he scored the second goal in a 2–2 home draw against Wolverhampton Wanderers in the FA Cup. On 21 February, Salah became Liverpool's top goalscorer in European competitions after scoring the second goal in the Champions League match against Real Madrid in the first leg of the round of sixteen. Despite being defeated by Real Madrid in both legs of the round of sixteen and not advancing further in the competition, Salah finished the 2022–23 Champions League as the second-highest goalscorer in the competition, behind only Erling Haaland. Moreover, on 5 March, Salah scored two goals and delivered two assists against Manchester United in a 7–0 win and became Liverpool's top scorer in the Premier League with 129 goals, overtaking Robbie Fowler's tally of 128. Salah also became the first Liverpool player to score against Manchester United in five consecutive games. With his first goal against United, Salah became the highest scoring Egyptian ever with 303 career goals, surpassing Hossam Hassan who had scored 302 goals for club and country in all competitions between 1985 and 2007. On 6 May, Salah became the first player in Liverpool history to score in nine successive games at Anfield with his 100th goal at the stadium. On 15 May, Salah completed his first-ever hat-trick of assists in a Premier League match in 3–0 away win against Leicester City. At the end of the 2022–23 season, Liverpool narrowly missed out on Champions League qualification, with Salah describing himself as "totally devastated". Despite this, Salah was widely praised as one of the best performers in the Premier League that season.

==== 2023–2024: EFL Cup and Liverpool records ====
In the 2023–24 preseason, Salah was the recipient of a two-year contract offer worth £155m from Saudi Pro League side Al-Ittihad. Had Salah accepted the offer, he would have joined his former teammate Fabinho in Jeddah and Liverpool would have received a £52m transfer fee. However, the agent of Salah, Ramy Abbas Issa, stated on 7 August 2023 that his client was "committed" to Liverpool. On 1 September 2023, Al-Ittihad sent an offer worth £150 million to sign him. However, the deal was eventually turned down by Liverpool on the same day. In the 2023–24 season, Salah moved into a playmaker role on the pitch, with manager Jürgen Klopp stating that now the situation was "slightly different, especially with Darwin [Núñez] when he ... [was] playing". Klopp further opined that Salah was "smart enough to adapt to all these different things" and that he was "in all phases world class".

On 21 October 2023, Salah scored the 200th and 201st league goals of his career with a brace in the Merseyside derby. On 26 October, Salah scored the last goal in a 5–1 victory against Toulouse to become the highest-scoring Premier League player in European competitions, overtaking Thierry Henry. On 29 October, with Salah scoring in a 3–0 victory against Nottingham Forest, he became the third player in Liverpool history to achieve the feat of scoring in each of the opening five home league matches of a season, after Harry Chambers and John Aldridge. Chambers and Aldridge made this achievement in 1922 and 1987 respectively. On 9 December, Salah scored his 200th goal for Liverpool in a 2–1 win away to Crystal Palace in the Premier League to become the fifth player at the club to reach the landmark, following Ian Rush, Roger Hunt, Gordon Hodgson and Billy Liddell. On 14 March 2024, he netted a goal in a 6–1 win over Sparta Prague in the Europa League round of 16, in which he became the first player to score at least 20 goals in seven consecutive seasons for Liverpool, breaking Ian Rush's previous record of six between 1981 and 1982 and 1986–87. On 7 April, Salah scored in a 2–2 draw away against Manchester United, bringing his Premier League goal tally at Old Trafford to six, the most of any visiting player in the competition's history, overtaking Steven Gerrard's five goals. On 25 May, Salah was named the top African goalscorer in the 2023–24 Premier League season with 18 goals in 34 league appearances. On 7 June, he was awarded Liverpool's Player of the Season for the fourth time in his career. The end of the season saw Jürgen Klopp's departure from Liverpool; across his tenure as Liverpool manager, Salah was his most used player.

==== 2024–2025: Record-breaking Premier League campaign ====
On 17 August 2024, Salah broke the record for the most goals scored on opening day in Premier League history after netting in a 2–0 win over newly promoted Ipswich Town. On 4 September, Salah was controversially not nominated for the 2024 Ballon d'Or. On 2 October, with a curled goal in a 2–0 victory over Bologna in the Champions League, he surpassed Didier Drogba as the all-time highest scoring African player in the competition. On 20 October, Salah scored a penalty against Chelsea, bringing his Premier League total that season up to five goals and five assists in eight games played. This remains the earliest into a season a Liverpool player has both scored five or more goals and assisted five or more in the competition. The beginning of the season took place among much discussion about the potential expiry of the contracts of Salah as well as teammates Virgil van Dijk and Trent Alexander-Arnold. On the matter, Micah Richards commented: "they [Liverpool] have got to sign Mo Salah up, it is imperative they give him a two-year deal." On 24 November, Salah scored a brace in a 3–2 away win against Southampton, the latter goal of which was his 100th away goal for Liverpool in all competitions. On 4 December, he scored a brace and provided an assist in a 3–3 draw against Newcastle United to become the first player in Premier League history to both score and assist in 37 separate matches, overtaking Wayne Rooney's tally of 36.

On 10 December 2024, he scored his 50th Champions League goal in Liverpool's 1–0 victory against Girona. Four days later, he registered his 100th assist for Liverpool in all competitions, in the Premier League game against Fulham. On 22 December, he scored a brace and provided two assists in a 6–3 away victory over Tottenham Hotspur to become the first player in Premier League history to reach double digits in both goals and assists before Christmas with 15 goals and 11 assists. He also became Liverpool's fourth-highest goalscorer of all time with 229 goals to his name, as he surpassed Billy Liddell's tally. Salah entered the all-time top 50 goalscorers in English top flight history list with his 173rd goal in total on Boxing Day 2024, after scoring an 82nd-minute goal against Leicester City. With only 18 league games played in the season, Salah broke three more Premier League records when he netted a goal and provided two assists in a dominant 5–0 victory over West Ham United at the London Stadium on 29 December 2024, becoming the first player to score and assist in eight different games in a single season, and setting a record for the fewest matches to reach 30 goal involvements in a season, and most goal contributions in a single month for any player in Premier League history, while entering the Premier League's top ten list of all-time assists with 81 to his name, surpassing David Beckham. In addition, he became the first player in Liverpool history to score at least 20 goals in all competitions for eight consecutive seasons breaking his own previous season record.

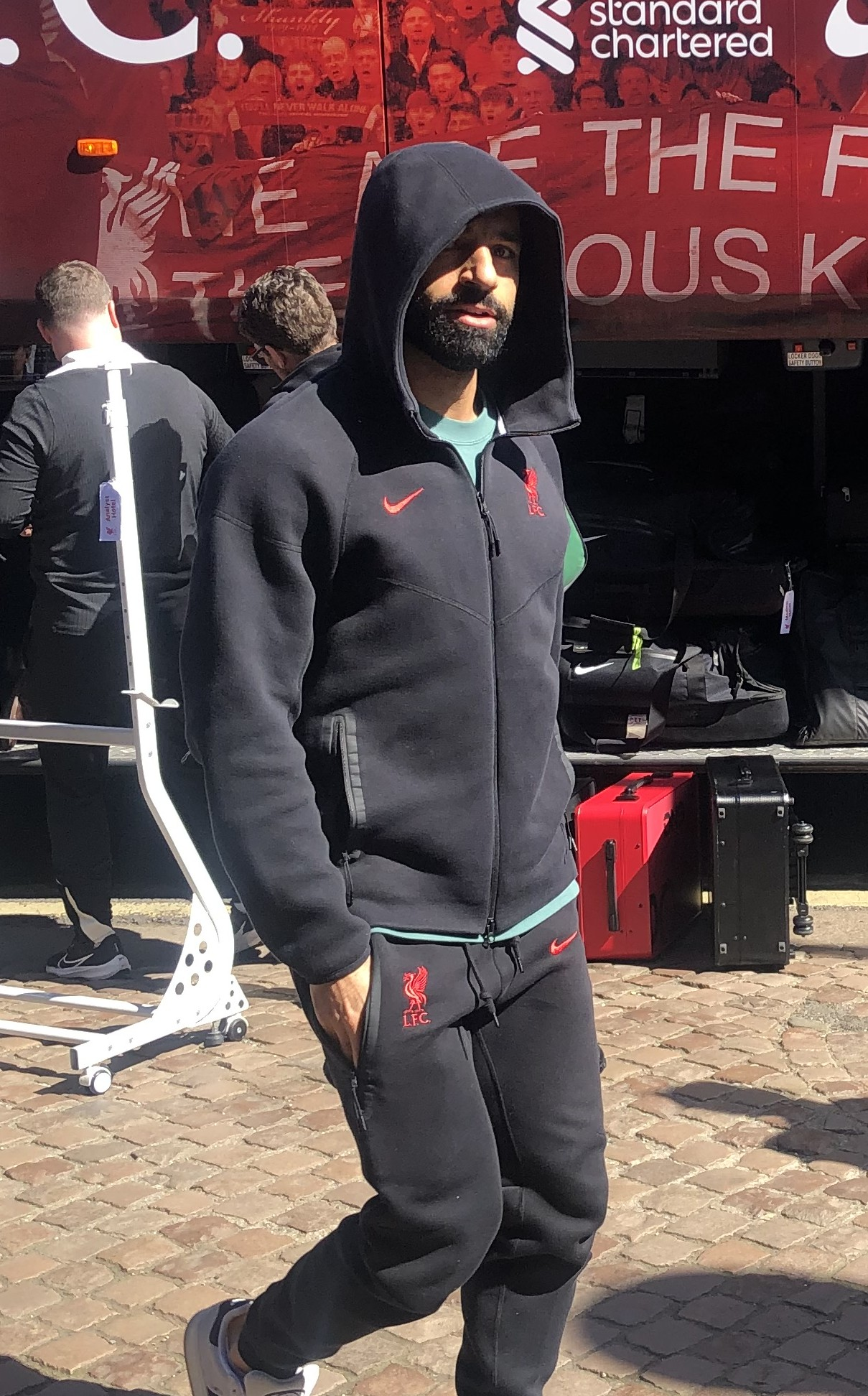
Salah with Liverpool in April 2025

On 21 January 2025, Salah scored his 50th goal for Liverpool in European competitions in a 2–1 victory over Lille at Anfield. The following two league matchdays saw him score against Ipswich Town in a 4–1 home win, then a brace in a 2–0 away victory at Bournemouth, increasing his tally to 178 in the Premier League, moving up to sixth in the Premier League top goalscorers list, overtaking Thierry Henry and Frank Lampard. He also became only the fifth player in Premier League history to score at least 20 goals in a season for the fifth time. On 12 February, in the last Merseyside derby at Goodison Park, Salah became the fourth player to record 100 goal involvements in as many Premier League matches, after Alan Shearer, Thierry Henry and Robin van Persie. On 19 February, he registered a goal and an assist in a 2–2 away draw with Aston Villa, becoming the first player to score 15 away league goals in a single season, and just the fifth player in Premier League history to register at least 15 goals and 15 assists in a single season. Four days later, a goal and an assist in a 2–0 victory over Manchester City at the Etihad Stadium saw him set five more Premier League, club and European records including becoming the first player to score and assist in eleven Premier League matches, the most by a player in a single season in one of Europe's Big Five leagues since Lionel Messi did so with eleven for Barcelona in the 2014–15 season. On 8 March, he became the third-highest goalscorer in Liverpool history with two goals in a 3–1 home win over Southampton in the Premier League.

On 11 April, Salah signed a two-year contract extension after months of speculation over his future at the club, due to his contract being set to end at the end of the season and interest from other clubs, namely from the Saudi Pro League. Two days later, Salah recorded his 18th league assist of the season, setting up Luis Díaz's goal against West Ham United. This was his 45th goal involvement of the season, setting a record in a 38-game Premier League campaign. On 27 April, the day Liverpool secured their second Premier League title after a 5–1 victory over Tottenham Hotspur at Anfield, Salah netted the fourth goal to become the highest foreign goalscorer in Premier League history, surpassing Sergio Agüero, while moving up to fifth in the league's all-time top scorers list.

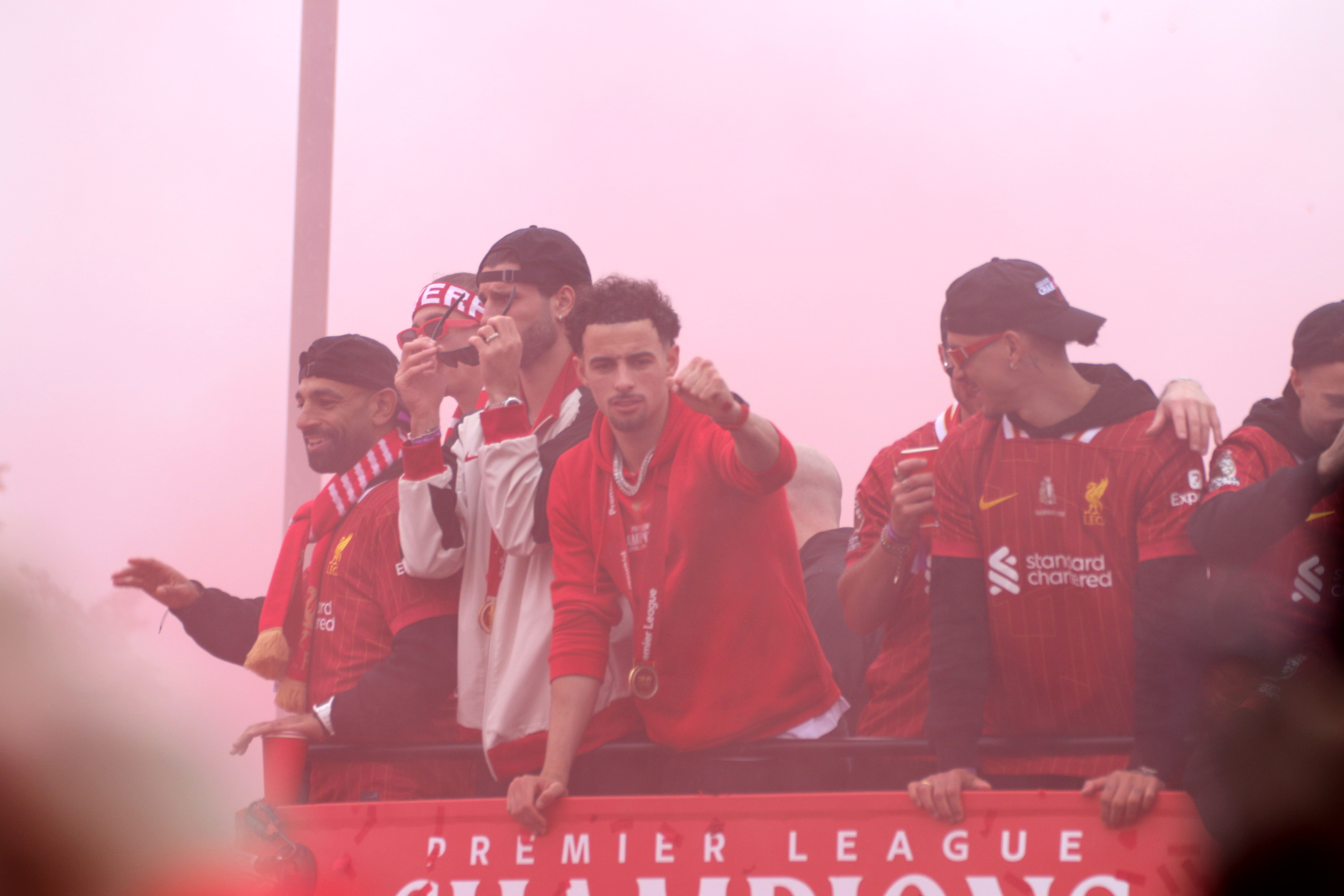
Salah (left) with his teammates during Liverpool's Premier League title-winning parade on 26 May 2025 celebrating the club's record-equalling 20th league title.

Salah finished the season by winning the Premier League Player of the Season award, the Golden Boot for most goals scored and the Playmaker award for most assists, making him the first player in Premier League history to win all three awards in the same season. It was the fourth different season that Salah finished as the Premier League's top scorer, equalling Thierry Henry's record for most Golden Boots. In addition, as the top goalscorer and assist-maker, he was only the third player in the league's history to top both metrics, along with Andy Cole in 1993–94 and Harry Kane in 2020–21. Sixteen of Salah's 29 Premier League goals were scored away from home, a joint record, while he also added eleven away assists, another joint record. Salah's 27 became the most goals and assists combined away from home in one season. All 18 of his assists came from open play, only behind Thierry Henry in the 2002–03 season with 20. Salah was also the Premier League's most creative player in open play, creating 86 chances and the most big chances (27) for his team-mates. Salah also had the most shots (130), registered the best xG (25.4) and had the most touches in the opposition box (394). Salah also matched the Premier League record for the most goal involvements in one season (47), equal with Alan Shearer and Andy Cole, though they achieved it in a 42-game season versus the 38-game season for Salah, and the most goal involvements since the 1995–96 season, when the number of teams was reduced to 20.

On 19 May, Salah was interviewed by Gary Neville on Sky Sports. On the subject of the Ballon d'Or, Salah stated: "It used to drive me crazy before. Some stuff is not in your hands so you give up in that direction. When you go to work, you remind yourself what you want to achieve in the season so it drives you to work harder. I'd love to win it one day. But if it didn't happen, I don't know what to do." On his chances of obtaining the award as a result of the 2024–25 season, Salah opined: "I would say I never had a season like this and winning big trophies, so I would say this is my best chance to get it right now while I'm in the club because it's been a crazy year, a crazy season with a trophy… It's given me a good chance." On 20 June, it was announced that Salah was one of six nominees for the PFA Players' Player of the Year, before winning it for a record third time on 19 August, surpassing Thierry Henry and five others.

==== 2025–2026: Premier League record for goal involvements for Liverpool and departure ====
On 15 August 2025, Salah scored a stoppage-time goal in Liverpool's 4–2 win over Bournemouth, bringing his total to a record ten Premier League opening-day goals across different seasons. He netted his 188th Premier League goal in a 1–0 victory over Burnley on 14 September, taking him outright fourth in the all-time goalscoring rankings, ahead of Andy Cole. In the run-up to the 2025 Ballon d'Or, many footballing figures including Casemiro, Hossam Hassan, Mido, Abedi Pele, Paolo Di Canio, William Troost-Ekong, and Patrice Motsepe endorsed Salah as the rightful winner. Liverpool manager Arne Slot stated: "He's had very, very, very good seasons at Liverpool but this one probably stands out in terms of numbers. If there's ever a chance for him, it would be this season. If not, then he's going to try to push even harder next season". However, on 22 September, Salah was controversially placed just fourth in the Ballon d'Or rankings and did not attend the ceremony. Charlie Malam of the Daily Express wrote that Salah "will surely go down as one of the best players never to win it, and one of the most disrespected players of all time". Later that year, on 22 November, he made his 300th Premier League appearance for Liverpool in a 3–0 home defeat against Nottingham Forest, becoming the fifth player to achieve this feat following Jamie Carragher, Steven Gerrard, Jordan Henderson and Sami Hyypiä.

Salah had been substituted on three successive occasions in the Premier League, and was unused in a 3–3 draw away at Leeds United on 6 December. Following the result, he stated in an interview that he felt that Liverpool had "thrown [him] under the bus", and viewed the club's recent situation as "not acceptable". He expressed confusion as to why he was not being played, opining that "I am not bigger than anyone but I earned my position". Salah also shared that his relationship with Arne Slot had deteriorated, despite the two maintaining a "good relationship" in the past, and that "someone doesn't want [him] in the club". Subsequently, he was left out of the Champions League away match against Inter Milan. On 13 December, he returned to action, coming off the bench to provide an assist in a 2–0 victory over Brighton. With that assist, he surpassed Wayne Rooney to hold the record for the most goal involvements for a single club in Premier League history, totaling 277, and third overall with 280, behind only Alan Shearer (324) and Wayne Rooney (311). On 28 January 2026, he reached his 80th Champions League appearance for Liverpool, matching Jamie Carragher's club record, as the team cruised to a 6–0 win over Qarabağ. On 11 February, he registered an assist in a 1–0 away victory against Sunderland, equaling Liverpool's Premier League assist record of 92 previously set by Steven Gerrard, and also moving into seventh place all-time with 93 total assists, level with David Silva.

In March 2026, he made his record-breaking 81st appearance against Galatasaray in the competition's round of 16 first leg, then went on to score his 50th goal in the tournament during a 4–0 victory in the second leg, also providing an assist in the match. On 24 March 2026, Salah announced his departure from Liverpool at the end of the season. Later that year, on 24 May, he registered an assist in a 1–1 draw against Brentford in his last game for the club on the final day of the season, recording his 93rd Premier League assist for the club and surpassing Gerrard's previous record for the most Premier League assists in Liverpool history.

=== Trabzonspor ===
Following a failed move to Beşiktaş due to financial disagreements over shirt-sale revenue sharing and agent commission demands, Salah opted to join fellow Turkish club Trabzonspor. Before the move was officially announced, Salah was welcomed by hundreds of Trabzonspor supporters upon his arrival in Turkey and wore the No. 61 shirt, a number that represents Trabzon's area code and holds strong cultural significance for the club's fans. He was subsequently confirmed to wear the No. 10 shirt. He became the fourth Egyptian to join the club, following Ayman Abdel-Aziz, Sayed Moawad, and Trézéguet. On 6 August 2026, Salah signed a two-year contract with the club. On 15 August, he made his debut as a substitute in a 1–1 away draw with Kasımpaşa. A week later, on 23 August, he scored his first goals for the club, netting a brace in a 2–1 victory over İstanbul Başakşehir.

On 19 September, Salah scored his first hat-trick for Trabzonspor and provided an assist in a 4–0 home win against defending champions Galatasaray, becoming the first foreign player since the 2000–01 season to score in each of his first three home games for the club.

== International career ==
=== Youth ===
Salah played for both the Egypt national under-20 and under-23 team, representing Egypt in both the 2011 FIFA U-20 World Cup and the 2012 Summer Olympics, scoring a penalty against Argentina in the round of sixteen of the former tournament, with Egypt losing the match 2–1.

Salah was selected for the Egypt squad to play at the 2012 Summer Olympics scoring in all three of the team's group games. In their opening match on 26 July, he scored Egypt's second goal in a 3–2 defeat to Brazil. He scored the equaliser in their 1–1 draw against New Zealand on 29 July, before scoring Egypt's opening goal in a 3–1 win over Belarus in their final group stage game played on 1 August, securing advancement into the knockout stage of the tournament, where Egypt were eliminated following a 3–0 quarter-final defeat to Japan on 4 August.

=== Senior ===
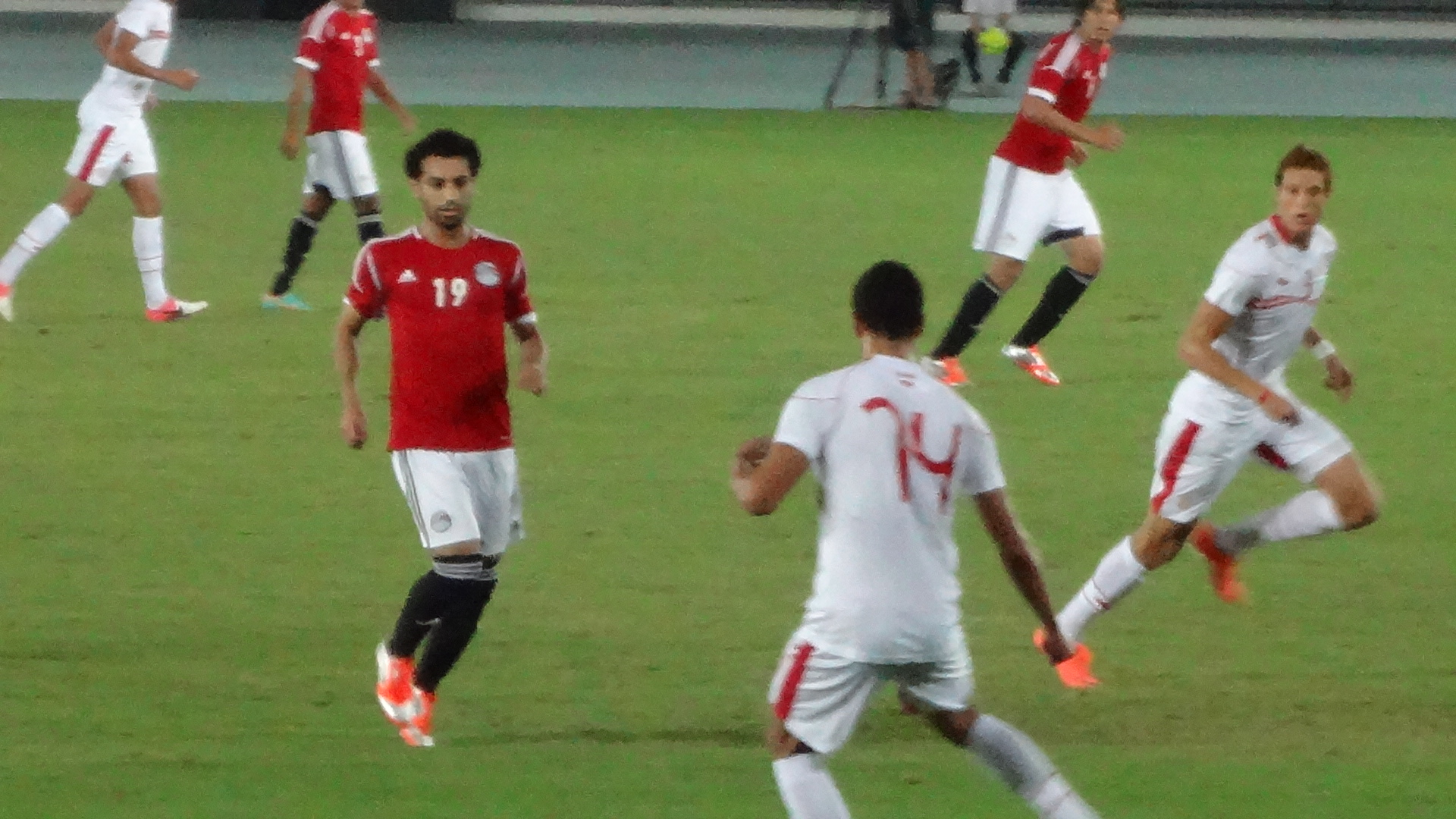
Salah (number 19) playing for Egypt against Tunisia during a friendly match in October 2012

On 3 September 2011, Salah made his debut for the senior Egypt national team in a 2–1 away defeat by Sierra Leone. He scored his first goal for Egypt's senior team in the 3–0 win against Niger a month later, on 8 October, in qualifying for the 2012 Africa Cup of Nations.

On 10 June 2012, he scored a goal in the 93rd minute in stoppage time against Guinea to give Egypt an important 3–2 away victory in a 2014 FIFA World Cup qualifier. On 9 June 2013, Salah scored a hat-trick in a 4–2 away win against Zimbabwe as Egypt won their fourth consecutive match in the World Cup qualifiers. A week later in the following match, he scored the only goal away to Mozambique, putting Egypt into the final qualifying group. On 10 September, Salah scored his sixth tournament goal in a 4–2 win over Guinea, securing Egypt a 100% record to finish their qualifying group and becoming the joint-top scorer among all African teams in the qualification stages.

On 10 October 2014, Salah scored in a 2–0 win over Botswana, also scoring in the return fixture on five days later, in qualifying for the 2015 Africa Cup of Nations. On 19 November, Salah scored the opening goal in a 2–1 away defeat to Tunisia, as Egypt missed out on qualifying for the Africa Cup of Nations finals for a third consecutive time.

==== First AFCON final and first World Cup ====
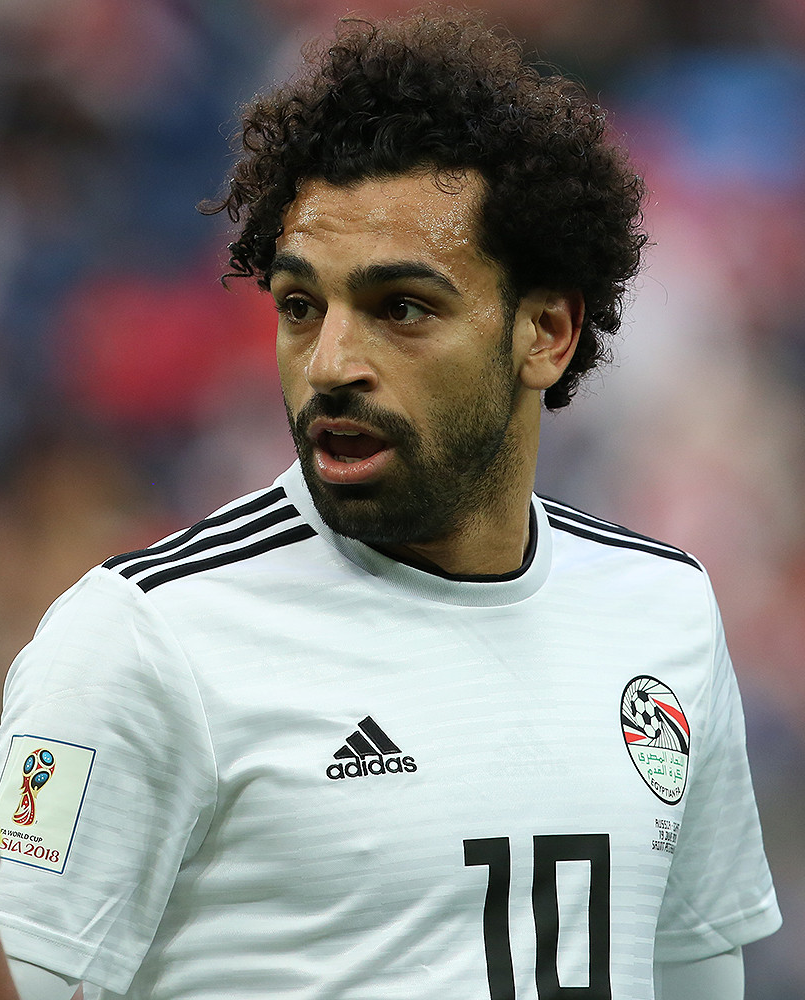
Salah playing for Egypt at the 2018 FIFA World Cup

Salah was a member of the Egypt squad for the 2017 Africa Cup of Nations held in Gabon. On 25 January, he scored a free kick in Egypt's 1–0 win over Ghana to secure first place in Group D. He went all the way to the final with Egypt, scoring twice and assisting two times in six games, earning him a place in the CAF Team of the Tournament.

Salah was the top scorer for Egypt with five goals during 2018 FIFA World Cup qualification, including both goals in the decisive 2–1 victory over Congo, one of which was a penalty in the last minute to make the Pharaohs reach their first World Cup finals since the 1990 tournament. Despite doubts over his fitness following his shoulder injury, Salah was included in Egypt's 29-man provisional squad for the World Cup and was included in their final 23-man squad on 4 June. He missed Egypt's opening match against Uruguay on 15 June, which the Pharaohs lost 1–0, conceding in the 89th minute. Salah scored a penalty in Egypt's 3–1 defeat to hosts Russia at the Krestovsky Stadium, Saint Petersburg four days later, a result which saw them eliminated from the tournament in the first round. In Egypt's final group game on 25 June, Salah scored his second goal at the World Cup with a chip over goalkeeper Yasser Al-Mosailem in Egypt's 2–1 defeat to Saudi Arabia at the Volgograd Arena. However, he became the first African player to score in both his opening two World Cup matches, and also equaled Abdelrahman Fawzy as Egypt's all-time top scorer in the competition.

On 8 September, in a 6–0 win over Niger in qualifying for the 2019 Africa Cup of Nations, Salah scored two goals, provided two assists and also missed two penalties. His first penalty, in the first minute of the game, was saved, while the second he converted the loose ball after it was initially saved.

On 16 June 2019, Salah provided two assists after coming on as a substitute in 3–1 win over Guinea in friendly warm-up game for the 2019 Africa Cup of Nations on home soil, wearing the captain's armband for the first time in his international career. On 26 June, Salah scored his first goal of the tournament in Egypt's second group stage match, in a 2–0 win over DR Congo; he was also involved in the opening goal of the match, which was scored by captain Ahmed Elmohamady. In Egypt's last group stage match, Salah scored his second goal of the tournament via a free kick against Uganda, as Egypt emerged as Group A winners of the tournament.

==== Captaincy, second AFCON final and 2022 World Cup qualifiers ====
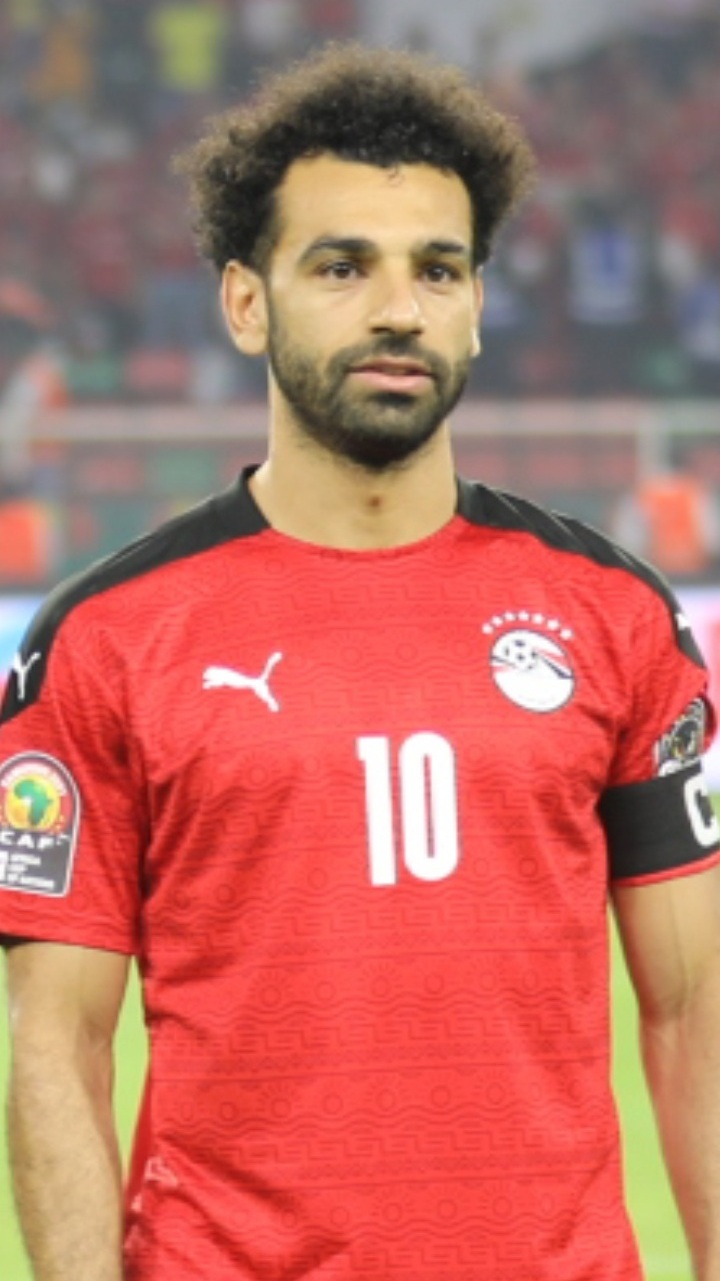
Salah lining up in the 2021 Africa Cup of Nations final.

Salah was named as the captain of the Egypt national team in September 2019. In 2021–22, Salah faced his Liverpool teammate Sadio Mané twice, as Egypt competed against Senegal in the 2021 Africa Cup of Nations final and the third round of 2022 World Cup qualification. However, Egypt lost both encounters via penalty shoot-outs.

On 24 March 2023, Salah scored his 50th international goal for Egypt, making Egypt the only African team with more than one player who had scored at least 50 international goals. On 16 November, Salah scored four goals in Egypt's 6–0 win over Djibouti, and became Egypt's highest goalscorer in World Cup qualification matches overtaking Mohamed Aboutrika.

On 30 December 2023, he was selected in the 27-man squad for the 2023 Africa Cup of Nations in Ivory Coast. On 14 January 2024, he scored a stoppage-time penalty in a 2–2 draw against Mozambique in the opening match of group stage, becoming the first Egyptian to score in four different AFCON tournaments. Four days later, he sustained a hamstring injury against Ghana, which forced him to withdraw from the competition. Later that year, on 10 June, he earned his 100th international cap, in which he also scored a goal, in a 1–1 away draw against Guinea-Bissau during the 2026 FIFA World Cup qualification. On 8 October 2025, he netted a brace in a 3–0 away win over Djibouti, sealing his nation's qualification for the 2026 FIFA World Cup. With his brace against Djibouti, he became the all-time top scorer in the history of the African World Cup qualifiers, by netting 20 goals for Egypt. He surpassed the previous joint record of 18 goals held by Didier Drogba, Samuel Eto'o, Moumouni Dagano, and Islam Slimani. On 10 January 2026, following Salah's goal against Ivory Coast in the quarter-finals of the 2025 Africa Cup of Nations, he became the first and only African player to score against eleven different teams in the history of the Africa Cup of Nations. However, Egypt eventually finished fourth at the African tournament.

==== Second World Cup ====
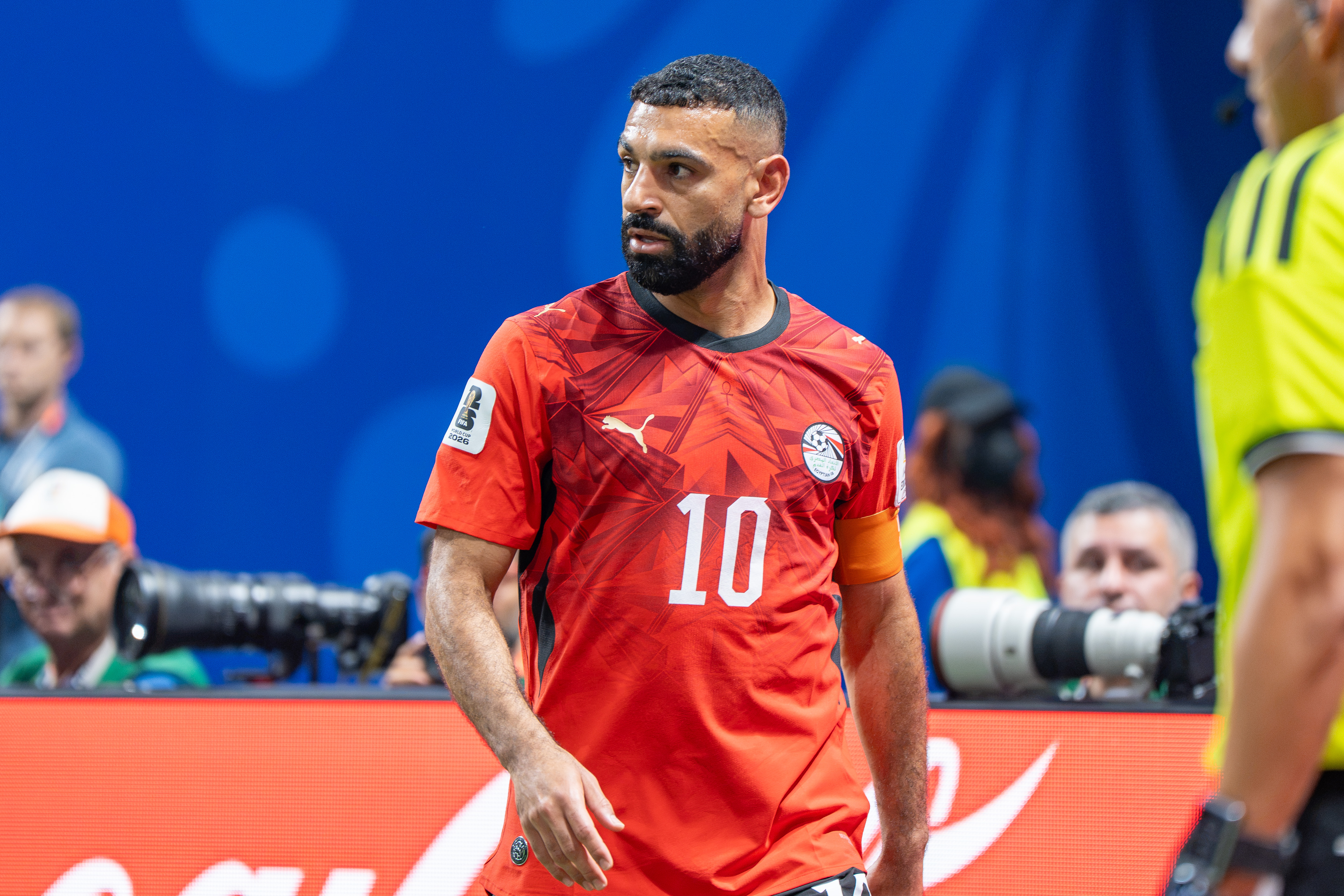
Salah playing for Egypt in the 2026 FIFA World Cup.

Salah was selected in the 26-man squad for the 2026 FIFA World Cup, marking his second World Cup appearance and sharing this record with Mohamed El Shenawy and Trézéguet. In Egypt's opening group match of the 2026 World Cup on 15 June, Salah assisted Emam Ashour's goal in a 1–1 draw against Belgium in Seattle. Hence, he became the first African player and fourth player overall to provide an assist on his birthday in a World Cup match, following Luigi Di Biagio, Patrick Vieira and Ola Toivonen. On 21 June, he scored one goal and provided an assist in a 3–1 victory over New Zealand, earning the Man of the Match award as Egypt secured their first-ever victory at a World Cup. He also became Egypt's all-time leading scorer at the World Cup with three goals, breaking the tie with Abdelrahman Fawzi. At 34 years and 6 days old, he also became the oldest Egyptian player to score at the tournament, surpassing the previous record held by Magdi Abdelghani. In the Round of 32 against Australia, he converted a Panenka penalty in the shootout and was named Man of the Match as his side won 4–2 following a 1–1 draw. Egypt were eliminated in the round of 16 by defending champions Argentina following a controversial 3–2 defeat, which saw Argentina make a late comeback. During the match, Salah set-up a goal by Mostafa Ziko, which was later disallowed by the referee, François Letexier, for a foul by Marwan Attia on Lisandro Martínez in the build-up, following VAR review; Salah later also played a role in Ziko's goal to give Egypt a 2–0 lead. However, in the build-up to Enzo Fernández's match-winning goal for Argentina in injury time, Salah lost the ball and went to ground after being tackled by Julián Alvarez inside the Argentine penalty area; despite protests from the Egyptian players and staff for an alleged foul on Salah, the goal stood, a decision which drew criticism from some media outlets, who likened the two incidents to one another, despite their different outcomes.

==== Record goalscorer ====
On 14 November 2026, Salah became Egypt's all-time record goalscorer when he scored his 69th and 70th goals in a 5-0 win over Malawi, the second of which was a Panenka penalty. This also made him only the third African footballer to score 70 international goals, after Godfrey Chitalu and Kinnah Phiri.

== Player profile ==
=== Analysis ===
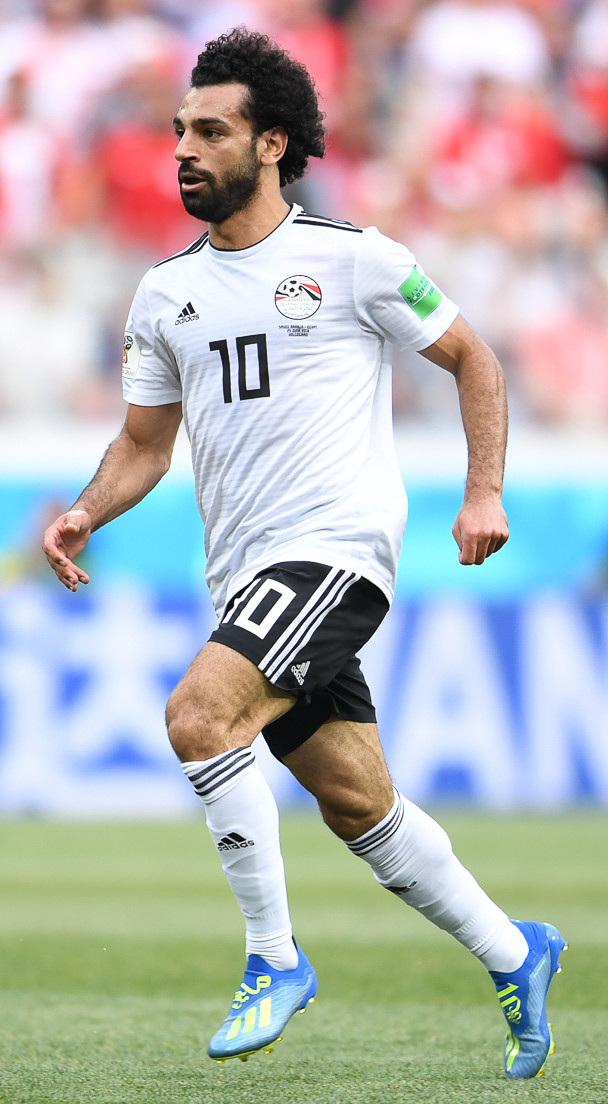
Salah (pictured in 2018) is best known for his speed, dribbling, clinical finishing and playmaking abilities.

Regarded as a quick, mobile, hard-working and tactical player, with good technique and an eye for goal, Salah is predominantly known for his speed, movement, clinical finishing, agility, dribbling skills, trivela pass, first touch, and ball control, as well as his ability to use both his pace and flair on the ball to beat opponents, and create scoring opportunities for himself or his teammates. In recent years, Salah's playmaking has started to receive increased recognition; he recorded 25 assists across the 2021–22 and 2022–23 Premier League seasons, compared to 33 assists across the four seasons prior to this. A world-class versatile forward, he primarily plays as a winger on the right flank, a position which allows him to cut into the centre onto his stronger left foot, and either shoot on goal or play quick exchanges with other players and make runs in behind the defence towards goal. He can also play in the centre behind the main striker as either an attacking midfielder or second striker. On his increased threat in front of goal since joining Liverpool, Salah credits Liverpool manager Jürgen Klopp's request for him to occupy more advanced central positions, often operating as a main striker, with the forward telling ESPN: "I play closer to the goal than any club before." Salah initially started his career at the left-back position; however, following a 4–0 win over the youth team of Egyptian club ENPPI, Salah was in tears for not scoring after missing several clear chances. This made his coach realise his passion for scoring goals, forcing him to move him to a forward position.

=== Reception ===
Salah is regarded by several pundits and footballing figures as one of the best players in the world and one of the greatest African players of all time. While Salah was playing at Al Mokawloon, American coach Bob Bradley saw Salah play and noted his prodigious speed, explosiveness and intelligence on the pitch, already evident at his young age. Upon signing for Chelsea, José Mourinho said of Salah: "He's young, he's fast, he's creative, he's enthusiastic. When we analysed him, he looks the kind of humble personality on the pitch, ready to work for the team." Mourinho added that Salah has "similar qualities" with "talented players" that he had worked with, such as Gareth Bale and Arjen Robben. His technical skills, pace, left foot, goalscoring, position and direct playing style led him to be nicknamed the "Egyptian Messi", in the Italian media. Ronaldo – whom Salah idolised while growing up – stated: "Salah is an incredible player with a tremendous quality. He looks like Messi." Salah has also received praise for his refusal to celebrate against his former clubs.

However, despite his status as a world-class footballer, some sources believe that Salah has always been disrespected by Ballon d'Or rankings. Notable examples used to substantiate this claim include Salah only ranking seventh in the 2021 Ballon d'Or, not being nominated for the 2024 Ballon d'Or, and only ranking fourth in the 2025 Ballon d'Or. Some journalists attribute this lack of recognition to anti-Arab racism, Islamophobia and Orientalism. Peter Bolster of This Is Anfield wrote in 2025 that "Edward Said's book, titled "Orientalism", laid out how Western cultures have long represented the East through a prism of exoticism, as something admirable but fundamentally foreign, to be observed but not truly embraced. That same intellectual framework applies in subtler but equally powerful ways, to the way football's establishment sees Salah. Salah is admired but rarely mythologised. He is watched but not always understood. He is celebrated for his strength, speed and goals, but seldom for his mind, and that in itself marks a departure from the way other great players are remembered." Bolster added that "[i]n 2024–25, he finished as the Premier League's Playmaker of the Season with a career-high 18 assists, proof that his creativity now stands alongside his goalscoring, and yet, the language around him remains frozen in time. He is still 'explosive', 'direct', and 'clinical', as if the subtleties of his game are too inconvenient to acknowledge. This is the cost of being seen through an Orientalist lens and one-dimensional narratives are easier to tell than complex realities." After the 2025 Ballon d'Or, several fans suggested that Salah supporting Palestine during the Gaza genocide had damaged his chances of finishing higher in the rankings.

== Personal life ==
Salah and his wife, Magi, married in 2013. Their daughter, Makka, born in 2014, is named in honour of the Islamic holy city of Mecca. They welcomed a second daughter, Kayan, in 2020. His son, Leil, was born in September 2026.

Salah is Muslim and celebrates goals by performing the sujud. On this goal celebration, Salah told CNN: "It's something like praying or thanking God for what I have received, but yeah, it's just praying and praying for a win. I've always done that since I was young, everywhere."

Salah enjoys playing football on his PlayStation, and has confessed jokingly that "Salah in the video game is stronger than the real one". On top of that, he would often choose Liverpool as his team while playing on his PlayStation, confessing that he loved the club while he was a youngster. Salah has also revealed that his favourite food is kushari, an Egyptian working class dish that is usually made from rice, pasta and lentils and topped with a variety of options including spiced tomatoes, chickpeas and onions.

During the 2018 Egyptian presidential election, a large number of spoilt ballot papers, possibly more than a million, involved voters crossing out both names and writing Salah's name instead.

From December 2019 and unto following years, Salah became infamous on social media for posting yearly photos of himself celebrating the Christmas season with his family, eliciting mixed reactions each year.

Salah was listed on the 2026 Sunday Times Tax List as one of the United Kingdom's top taxpayers, with an estimated 2025 tax bill of £14.5 million.

== Outside football ==
=== Sponsors ===
Salah has a sponsorship deal with sportswear and equipment supplier Adidas: he wears a special edition Adidas X Crazyfast+ football boots called Egyptian Nights. He appeared in an Adidas 2018 World Cup commercial along with other players who are also sponsored by them, including David Beckham, Lionel Messi, Paul Pogba and singer Pharrell Williams.

In March 2018, Salah appeared in an advertisement for Vodafone Egypt. Filmed visiting several Merseyside landmarks, the video was originally released in Arabic (but was also translated to English). A month later, he mentioned that he was "insulted" after his image was displayed across the national team's plane without his permission before the start of the World Cup that year, as the official sponsor of the national team, WE, is a rival of his sponsor.

=== Charity ===
Salah is active in regeneration projects in Nagrig, his hometown where most people live in poverty, donating money to help build a school and hospital. The project includes the construction of an Al-Azhar institute and an ambulance unit. In an interview with Al-Masry Al-Youm, Salah's father claimed that his son refused to accept any financial assistance with the project.

During his time in Egypt, Salah's family was once robbed; however, the thief was caught and arrested by police, with Salah's father preparing to press charges against him, but Mohamed convinced him to drop the case. Afterwards, Salah helped the thief financially, giving him some money and trying to find him a job. In February 2018, following a match against Tottenham, Salah donated a replica shirt to young supporter Mohamed Abdel Karim, who was previously pictured wearing a jumper reading Salah's name and shirt number. Moreover, Mohamed Salah has helped more than 450 families by giving them monthly allowances and he also helped the government by giving approximately $300,000 when the country was experiencing an economic crisis.

On 14 August 2022, a fire broke out at Abu Sefein Church in Giza, Egypt, with 41 people losing their lives as a result. Salah subsequently expressed his condolences on social media, and made a donation of three million Egyptian pounds to help rebuild the church.

=== Gaza war ===
During the Gaza war, Salah called for humanitarian aid to be allowed into the Gaza Strip and for the "massacres" and the "slaughter of innocent civilians" to stop. Salah also donated an undisclosed amount to support the Palestinian people. In August 2025, Palestinian footballer Suleiman Obeid was reportedly among civilians shot and killed by Israeli forces while waiting for aid in Gaza. UEFA subsequently made a social media post on Twitter paying tribute to Obeid, who was dubbed as the 'Palestinian Pele'. Salah criticised UEFA's post for failing to discuss the circumstances of his death.

== In popular culture ==
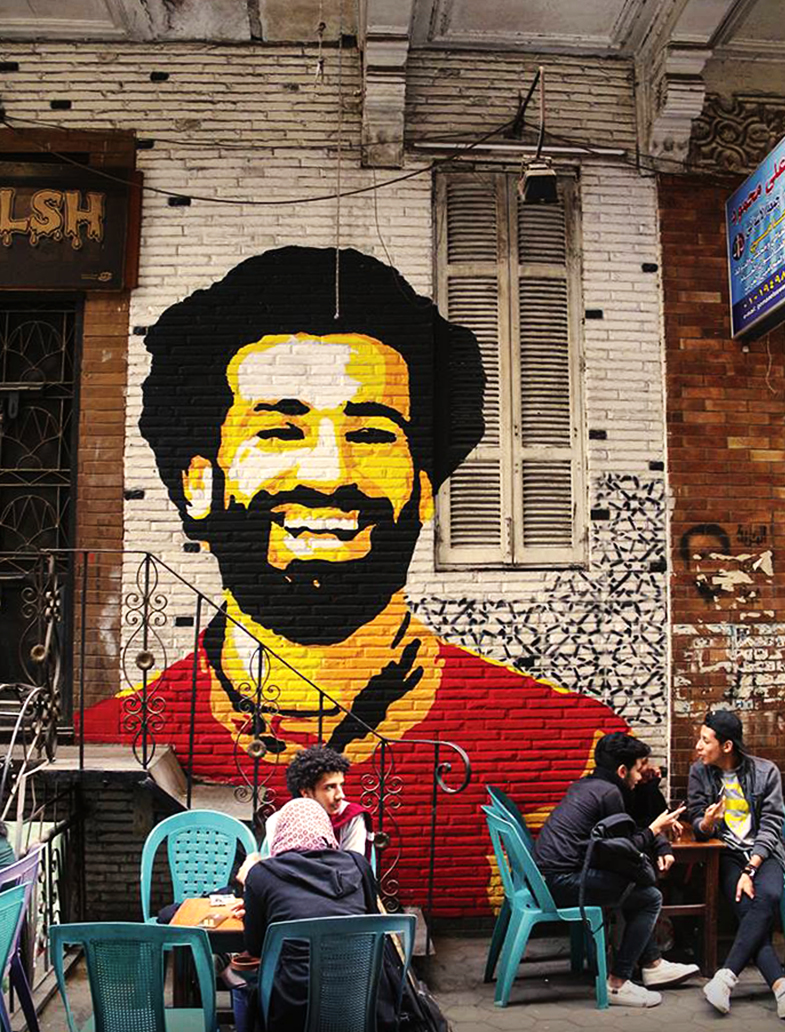
Graffiti of Salah in Cairo, 2018

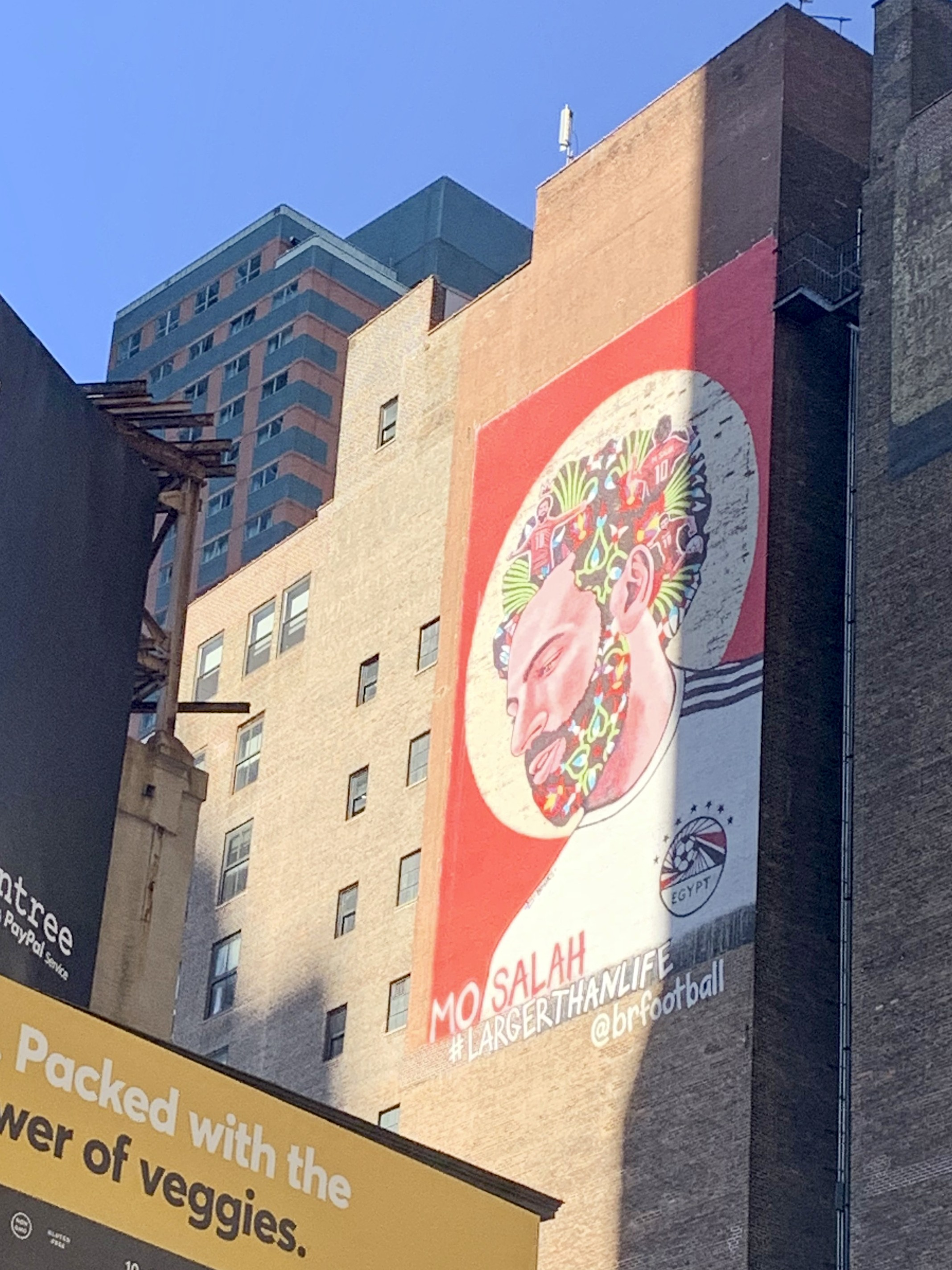
Salah mural in New York City, 2019

Salah is nicknamed "The Pharaoh" by the press and his fans, while Egyptians have referred to him as the "Fourth Pyramid".

The most popular chant for Salah was made by Liverpool supporters where they called him the Egyptian King – "Mo Salah, Mo Salah, Mo Salah! Running down the wing. Salah, lah, lah, lah, la-ahh, the Egyptian King!", to the tune of "Sit Down" by English indie rock band James. They also created another chant to the tune of Dodgy's "Good Enough", saying that if Salah continued to score goals, they would convert to Islam – "If he's good enough for you, he's good enough for me, if he scores another few, then I'll be Muslim too." Salah has given his approval to the chant, and it has been cited as an example of inclusivity. According to a 2021 study in the American Political Science Review, Salah's transfer to Liverpool led to a 16% reduction in hate crimes in the city, as well as reducing Islamophobic online rhetoric by Liverpool fans. Salah is devout to a degree that many other well-known Muslims sports figures are not, and his charm and apolitical persona have made him a popular figure in the UK. During his goal celebration, Salah lays in the prostrate position to thank God in sujud.

Following his goal that led Egypt to the World Cup finals for the first time in 28 years, a school in Egypt was named after him. After Egypt's exit from the World Cup, Salah stayed in his home country for his pre-season holiday, and in late June, his address was accidentally leaked on Facebook. During this time, huge crowds of fans showed up at Salah's house, with Salah greeting them and signing autographs for some, although according to reports in Spain, police did arrive to cordon off his house.

During Liverpool's 2018 pre-season tour in the US, American artist Brandan Odums created a mural in New York City's Times Square area displaying Salah in an Egypt kit, with the player later posting an image on social media posing next to it. In Egypt, several murals have also been created displaying Salah's likeness, including one in the capital of Cairo.

A testament to his influence in the region and globally, Salah was featured on the cover of two major magazines in 2018: GQ Middle East (feature story titled "The Unstoppable Rise of Mo Salah") and Time magazine's 2019 Time 100 edition. An advocate of women's equality in the Middle East, Salah (in his Time 100 entry) states, "We need to change the way we treat women in our culture". English comedian and Liverpool fan John Oliver wrote Salah's feature in the Time 100 issue. Oliver started the feature by writing: "Mo Salah is a better human being than he is a football player. And he's one of the best football players in the world." Despite being named as the GQ Middle East Man of the Year in 2019, another GQ photoshoot with Brazilian model Alessandra Ambrosio caused him some criticism in the Islamic world. In January 2020, it was announced that Salah would be honoured with a wax statue at Madame Tussauds in London.

== Career statistics ==
=== Club ===
As of match played 22 November 2026

Appearances and goals by club, season and competition
Club	Season	League			National cup (Note: Includes Egypt Cup, Swiss Cup, FA Cup, Coppa Italia)		League cup (Note: Includes Football League/EFL Cup)		Continental		Other		Total	
Club	Season	Division	Apps	Goals	Apps	Goals	Apps	Goals	Apps	Goals	Apps	Goals	Apps	Goals
Al-Mokawloon	2009–10	Egyptian Premier League	4	0	2	0	—		—		—		6	0
Al-Mokawloon	2010–11	Egyptian Premier League	21	4	4	1	—		—		—		25	5
Al-Mokawloon	2011–12	Egyptian Premier League	15	7	—		—		—		—		15	7
Al-Mokawloon	Total		40	11	6	1	0	0	0	0	0	0	46	12
Basel	2012–13	Swiss Super League	29	5	5	3	—		16 (Note: Two appearances in UEFA Champions League, fourteen appearances and two goals in UEFA Europa League)	2	—		50	10
Basel	2013–14	Swiss Super League	18	4	1	1	—		10 (Note: Appearances in UEFA Champions League)	5	—		29	10
Basel	Total		47	9	6	4	0	0	26	7	0	0	79	20
Chelsea	2013–14	Premier League	10	2	1	0	—		—		—		11	2
Chelsea	2014–15	Premier League	3	0	1	0	2	0	2	0	—		8	0
Chelsea	Total		13	2	2	0	2	0	2	0	0	0	19	2
Fiorentina (loan)	2014–15	Serie A	16	6	2	2	—		8 (Note: Appearances in UEFA Europa League)	1	—		26	9
Roma (loan)	2015–16	Serie A	34	14	1	0	—		7	1	—		42	15
Roma	2016–17	Serie A	31	15	2	2	—		8 (Note: Two appearances in UEFA Champions League, six appearances and two goals in UEFA Europa League)	2	—		41	19
Liverpool	2017–18	Premier League	36	32	1	1	0	0	15	11	—		52	44
Liverpool	2018–19	Premier League	38	22	1	0	1	0	12	5	—		52	27
Liverpool	2019–20	Premier League	34	19	2	0	0	0	8	4	4 (Note: One appearance in FA Community Shield, one appearance in UEFA Super Cup, two appearances in FIFA Club World Cup)	0	48	23
Liverpool	2020–21	Premier League	37	22	2	3	1	0	10	6	1 (Note: Appearance in FA Community Shield)	0	51	31
Liverpool	2021–22	Premier League	35	23	2	0	1	0	13	8	—		51	31
Liverpool	2022–23	Premier League	38	19	3	1	1	1	8	8	1	1	51	30
Liverpool	2023–24	Premier League	32	18	1	1	2	1	9	5	—		44	25
Liverpool	2024–25	Premier League	38	29	0	0	5	2	9	3	—		52	34
Liverpool	2025–26	Premier League	27	7	3	2	0	0	10	3	1	0	41	12
Liverpool	Total		315	191	15	8	11	4	94	53	7	1	442	257
Trabzonspor	2026–27	Süper Lig	12	9	0	0	—		5 (Note: Two appearances in UEFA Europa League, three appearances and two goals in UEFA Conference League)	2	0	0	17	11
Career total			508	257	34	17	13	4	149	65	7	1	711	345

=== International ===
As of match played 13 November 2026

Appearances and goals by national team and year
National team	Year	Apps	Goals
Egypt	2011	2	1
Egypt	2012	15	7
Egypt	2013	10	9
Egypt	2014	9	5
Egypt	2015	4	2
Egypt	2016	6	5
Egypt	2017	11	5
Egypt	2018	6	7
Egypt	2019	5	2
Egypt	2020	0	0
Egypt	2021	7	2
Egypt	2022	12	4
Egypt	2023	8	6
Egypt	2024	8	4
Egypt	2025	8	6
Egypt	2026	13	5
Total		124	70

== Honours ==
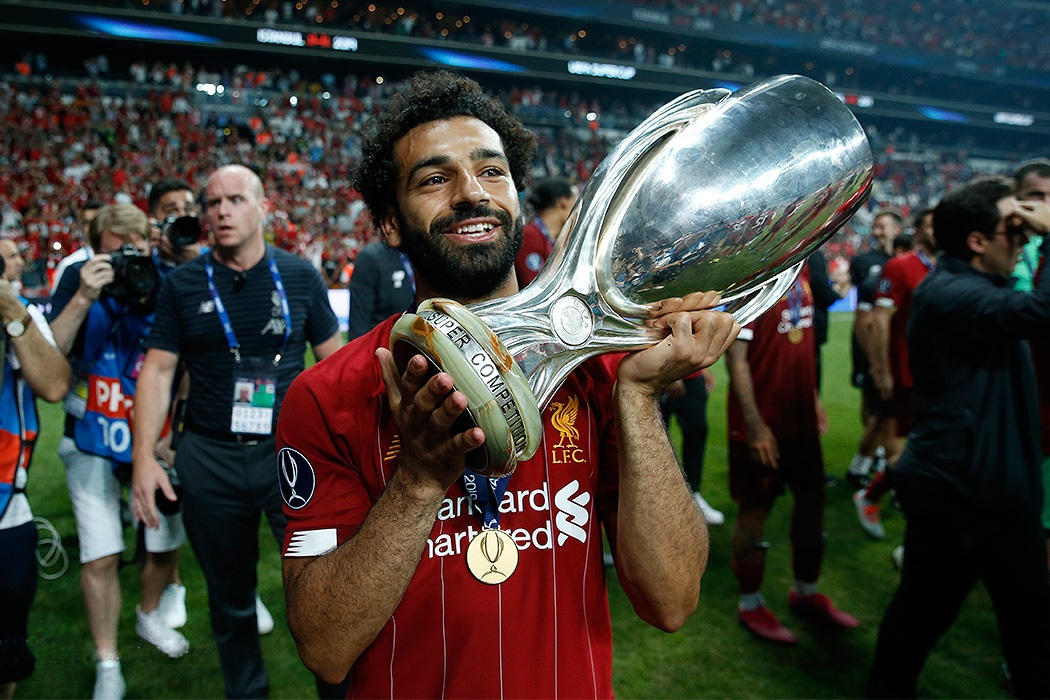
Salah with the UEFA Super Cup trophy in 2019

Basel

- Swiss Super League: 2012–13, 2013–14

Liverpool

- Premier League: 2019–20, 2024–25
- FA Cup: 2021–22
- EFL Cup: 2021–22, 2023–24; runner-up: 2024–25
- FA Community Shield: 2022; runner-up: 2020, 2025
- UEFA Champions League: 2018–19; runner-up: 2017–18, 2021–22
- UEFA Super Cup: 2019
- FIFA Club World Cup: 2019

Egypt

- Africa Cup of Nations runner-up: 2017, 2021

Individual

- CAF Most Promising Talent of the Year: 2012
- UAFA Golden Boy: 2012
- Swiss Super League Player of the Year: 2013
- El Heddaf Arab Footballer of the Year: 2013, 2017, 2018
- AS Roma Player of the Season: 2015–16
- Globe Soccer Best Arab Player of the Year: 2016
- CAF Team of the Year: 2017, 2018, 2019, 2023, 2024
- Africa Cup of Nations Team of the Tournament: 2017, 2021
- Premier League Player of the Month: November 2017, February 2018, March 2018, October 2021, October 2023, November 2024, February 2025
- Premier League Goal of the Month: January 2021, October 2021
- PFA Player of the Month: November 2017, December 2017, February 2018, March 2018, December 2018, January 2019, April 2019, September 2021, October 2021, February 2022, September 2023, October 2023, November 2024, February 2025
- BBC African Footballer of the Year: 2017, 2018
- African Footballer of the Year: 2017, 2018
- PFA Players' Player of the Year: 2017–18, 2021–22, 2024–25
- FWA Footballer of the Year: 2017–18, 2021–22, 2024–25
- Premier League Golden Boot: 2017–18, 2018–19 (shared), 2021–22 (shared), 2024–25
- Premier League Player of the Season: 2017–18, 2024–25
- Premier League Playmaker of the Season: 2021–22, 2024–25
- Premier League Goal of the Season: 2021–22
- PFA Premier League Team of the Year: 2017–18, 2020–21, 2021–22 2024–25
- Liverpool Players' Player of the Season: 2017–18, 2020–21, 2021–22,2023–24, 2024–25
- PFA Fans' Player of the Year: 2017–18, 2020–21, 2021–22
- CIES Football Observatory Most Influential Player of the Season: 2024–25
- UEFA Champions League Forward of the Season runner-up: 2017–18
- UEFA Champions League Squad of the Season: 2017–18
- ESM Team of the Year: 2017–18, 2021–22
- Onze d'Argent: 2017–18
- FIFA Puskás Award: 2018
- FIFA Club World Cup Golden Ball: 2019
- FSA Player of the Year: 2018, 2021, 2023
- Liverpool Goal of the Season: 2018–19, 2021–22, 2022–23
- IFFHS CAF Men's Team of The Year: 2020, 2021, 2022, 2023, 2024
- IFFHS World Men's Player of the Month: January 2025
- IFFHS Best CAF Men's Player of the Decade: 2011–2020
- IFFHS CAF Men's Team of the Decade: 2011–2020
- Time 100: 2019
- Laureus Sporting Inspiration Award: 2021
- Golden Foot: 2021
- IFFHS Best CAF Men's Player of the Year: 2021
- BBC Goal of the Month: December 2017, February 2018, April 2019, September 2019, January 2021, October 2021, November 2024
- BBC Goal of the Season: 2021–22
- Globe Soccer Fans' Player of the Year: 2022
- FPL Pod Player of the Year: 2025
- The Athletic's Premier League Player of the Year: 2024–25
- The Athletic Premier League Team of the Season: 2024–25
- The Athletic European Men's Team of the Season: 2024–25
- Premier League Fan Team of the Season: 2024–25
- EA Sports Premier League Team of the Season: 2024–25
- The Athletic Top 100 World Cup Players: 7th (2025)

== Records ==
As of match played 24 May 2026

Europe

- Fastest hat-trick in a UEFA Champions League match: 6 minutes and 12 seconds against Rangers, 12 October 2022
- Fastest UEFA Champions League hat-trick by a substitute: 6 minutes and 12 seconds against Rangers, 12 October 2022
- Most Champions League goals for an English club: 47 for Liverpool
- Most goals scored in UEFA club competitions by an African player: 63
- Fewest touches to score a hat-trick in a UEFA Champions League match: 9
- All-time African top goalscorer in UEFA Champions League history: 50
- Most goals in UEFA club competitions for an English club: 53 for Liverpool

England

- Most goals by an African player in a Premier League season: 32 in 2017–18
- Most Premier League Player of the Month awards in a single season: 3 (November 2017, February 2018 and March 2018)
- Most left-footed goals scored in a Premier League season: 25 in 2017–18
- Most teams scored against in a Premier League season: 17 (shared with Ian Wright and Robin van Persie)
- First and only player to outscore three Premier League teams in a Premier League season: West Bromwich Albion (31), Swansea City (28) and Huddersfield Town (28) in 2017–18
- First and only player to score on the opening day of six consecutive Premier League seasons: 2017–18 to 2022–23
- Highest-scoring African player in Premier League history: 193
- Most Premier League goals scored on opening weekend: 10
- Most left-footed goals scored in Premier League history: 152
- Most assists by an African player in Premier League history: 94
- Most Premier League games with both a goal and assist in the competition's history: 42
- First player to reach double figures for goals and assists before Christmas in Premier League history: Achieved on 22 December in 2024–25
- Most Premier League seasons with both 10+ goals and 10+ assists by a player in the competition's history: 6
- First player in Premier League history to produce 10+ goals and 10+ assists in four consecutive seasons: 2021–22 to 2024–25
- Most games in a single Premier League season with both a goal and assist: 11
- Fewest matches to reach 30 goal involvements in a season in Premier League history: 18
- Most goal contributions in a single month for any player in Premier League history: 14 in December 2024
- Most goal involvements by a player in their first 19 appearances in a season in Premier League history: 31
- Most away goal involvements by a player in a Premier League season: 27 in 2024–25
- Most seasons with at least 10 assists by a player in Premier League history: 6 (shared with Kevin De Bruyne and Cesc Fàbregas)
- Most away goals in a single Premier League season: 16 in 2024–25 (shared with Kevin Phillips and Harry Kane)
- First player in Premier League history to score and assist in both matches against the reigning champions in a season: vs. Manchester City in 2024–25
- Most away assists in a single Premier League season: 11 in 2024–25 (shared with Cesc Fàbregas)
- First player in Premier League history to register at least 40 goal involvements in two different seasons: 2017–18 and 2024–25
- First player to score at least 25 goals and register at least 15 assists in a Premier League season: in 2024–25
- Most assists by a player in a single Premier League month: 7 in December 2024 (shared with Antonio Valencia)
- First player in Premier League history to have at least 10 goal involvements within a single month in 3 different months: December 2018, December 2024, February 2025
- All-time most goal involvements in a 38-game Premier League season: 47
- All-time most goal involvements in a Premier League season: 47 (shared with Alan Shearer and Andy Cole, both of whom achieved it in a 42-game Premier League season)
- Most goal involvements for a single club in Premier League history: 277
- Most goal involvements at a single stadium (Anfield) in Premier League history: 152
- All-time highest scoring foreign player in Premier League history: 191
- Most Premier League Player of the Month awards in Premier League history: 7 (shared with Sergio Aguero and Harry Kane)
- First player in Premier League history to win the Golden Boot, Playmaker award and Premier League Player of the Season award in a single Premier League season: 2024–25
- Most Premier League Golden Boot awards in Premier League history: 4 (shared with Thierry Henry)
- First player in Premier League history to win both the Golden Boot and Playmaker awards in the same season twice: 2021–22, 2024–25
- Most FWA Footballer of the Year awards: 3 (shared with Thierry Henry)
- Most assists by a player against the big six in a Premier League season: 7 in 2024–25 (shared with Cesc Fabregas)
- Most goals and assists by a player against the big six in a Premier League season: 16 in 2024–25
- First player ever to win the PFA Players' Player of the Year award three times: 2017–18, 2021–22, 2024–25

Liverpool

- Most goals in a debut season: 44 in 2017–18
- Most European goals in a season: 11 in 2017–18 (shared with Roberto Firmino)
- Most games scored in during a single campaign: 34 in 2017–18
- Most top-flight goals in a season by a Liverpool player: 32 in the 2017–18 Premier League (shared with Ian Rush)
- Most Liverpool Player of the Month awards in a season: 7 months in 2017–18
- Fastest player to score 50 goals for Liverpool: 65 games in 2018–19
- Fastest Liverpool player to score 50 Premier League goals: 69 games in 2018–19
- Most goals in first 100 appearances overall in Liverpool history: 69
- Most goals in first 100 Premier League appearances in Liverpool history: 70
- All-time Liverpool top goalscorer in the UEFA Champions League: 46
- First and only Liverpool player to score at least 20 goals in five different Premier League seasons: 2017–18, 2018–19, 2020–21, 2021–22, 2024–25
- Fastest player to score 100 top-flight goals in Liverpool history: 151 games
- Most consecutive games a player has scored for Liverpool: 10 in 2021–22
- All-time Liverpool top goalscorer in European competition history: 51
- All-time Liverpool top goalscorer in Premier League history: 191
- Liverpool highest-ever away goalscorer in the Premier League: 81
- Most consecutive games a player has scored for Liverpool at Anfield: 9 in 2022–23
- First player in Liverpool history to score at least 20 goals in seven consecutive seasons in all competitions: 2017–18 to 2023–24
- First player in Liverpool history to score at least 20 goals in eight consecutive seasons in all competitions: 2017–18 to 2024–25
- Most penalties scored by a Liverpool player in Premier League history: 35
- Most Premier League goals by a player at Anfield: 107
- Most away goals in a single Premier League season for Liverpool: 16 in 2024–25
- Most assists in a single Premier League season for Liverpool: 18 in 2024–25
- Most seasons with at least 30 goals in all competitions in Liverpool history: 5 (2017–18, 2020–21, 2021–22, 2022–23, 2024–25) (shared with Roger Hunt and Ian Rush)
- Most goal involvements by a Liverpool player in a Premier League season: 47
- Most assists by a Liverpool player in the UEFA Champions League: 17
- All-time most Liverpool Player of the Season Awards: 5 (shared with Steven Gerrard)
- All-time most Premier League assists in Liverpool history: 93

Egypt

- Egypt's all-time highest goalscorer in FIFA World Cup history: 3 in 2018 and 2026
- Egypt's all-time highest goalscorer in Africa Cup of Nations qualification: 20
- Highest-scoring player in Egypt's football history with clubs and national team: 401
- Egypt's all-time highest goalscorer in FIFA World Cup qualification: 20
- First and only Egyptian player to score in five consecutive Africa Cup of Nations editions: 2017, 2019, 2021, 2023, 2025
- All-time top scorer of the Egypt national team: 70

Italy

- Highest-scoring Egyptian player in Serie A history: 35 in 81 games

== See also ==
- List of men's footballers with 100 or more international caps
- List of men's footballers with 50 or more international goals
- List of footballers with 100 or more Premier League goals
- List of Egyptian football players in foreign leagues
- List of UEFA Champions League top scorers
- List of Liverpool F.C. records and statistics
- Premier League records and statistics
