= Basyoun =

Basyoun بسيون
- City
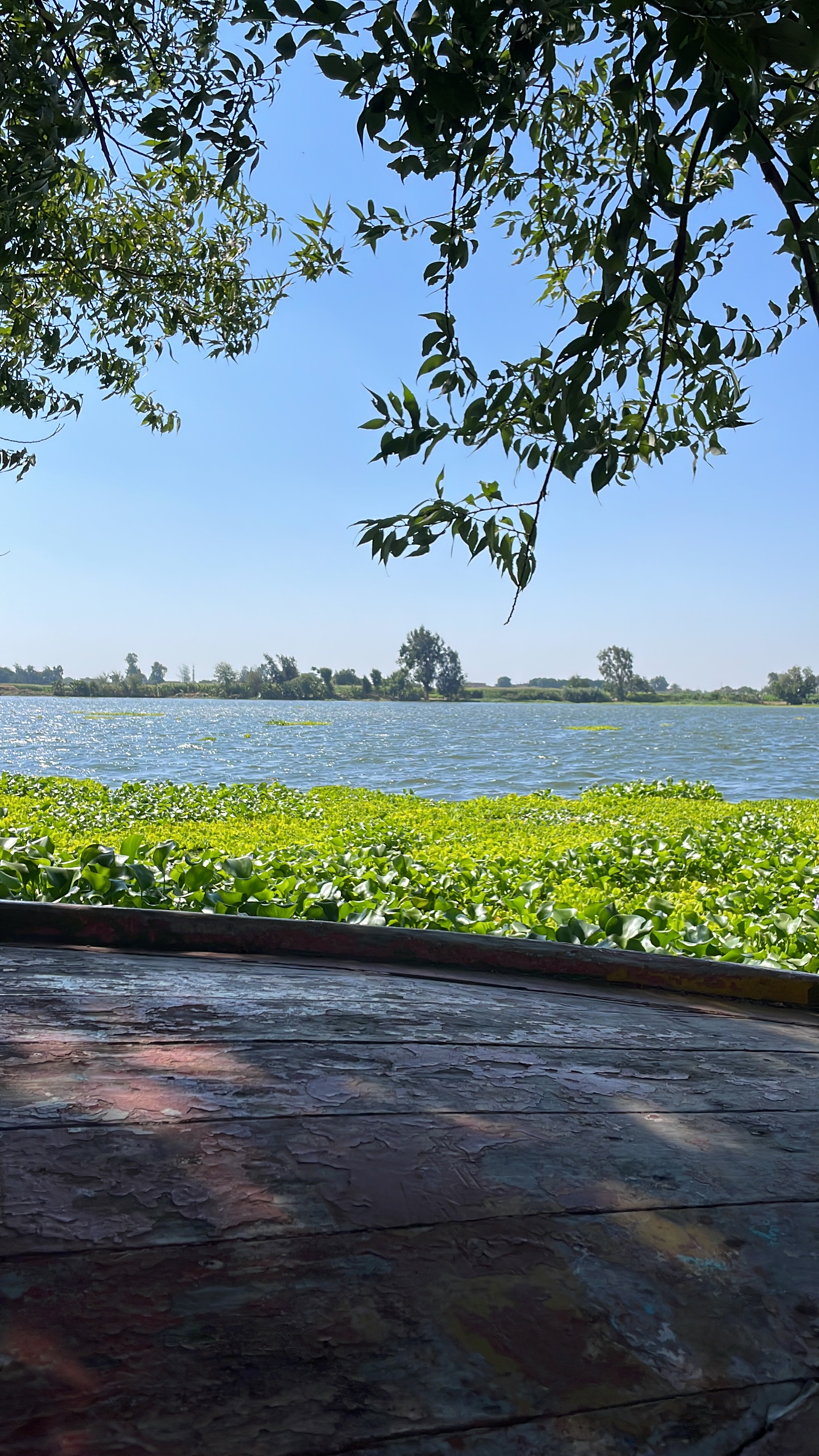
- The Nile in El-Forostoq, Basyoun

- Location of Basyoun within Egypt Basyoun (Africa) Basyoun (Earth)
- Coordinates: 30°56′31.1″N 30°48′41.5″E
- Country: Egypt

Area
  - Total: 157.5 km^{2} (60.8 sq mi)
- Elevation: 5 m (16 ft)

Population (2023)
  - Total: 320,056
  - Density: 2,032/km^{2} (5,263/sq mi)
- Time zone: UTC+2 (EET)
  - Summer (DST): UTC+3 (EEST)
- Area code: (+20) 2

Basyoun (Egyptian Arabic: بسيون) is a city and municipal division in the Gharbia Governorate, Egypt. (Note: Mohamed Salah was born in Nagrig, Egypt, a nearby village.)

== Notable people ==
- Saad El Shazly, Egyptian military commander

== See also ==
- List of cities and towns in Egypt
