= Stade Arsène Wenger =

Football stadium in Alsace, France

- Stade Arsène Wenger
- Interactive map of Stade Arsène Wenger
- Full name: Stade Arsène Wenger
- Location: Duppigheim, Alsace, France
- Coordinates: 48.5332°N 7.5959°E
- Operator: USL Duppigheim
- Capacity: 500

Construction
- Opened: 23 May 2016

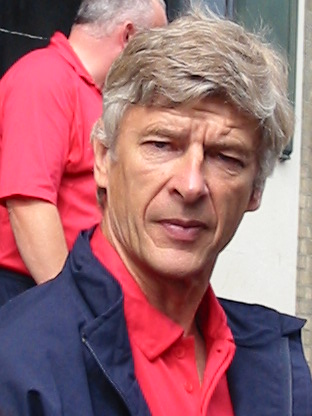
Arsène Wenger, for whom the stadium is named

Stade Arsène Wenger (lit. 'Arsène Wenger Stadium'), also erroneously called Stade de Arsène Wenger in international usage, is an association football stadium in Duppigheim, Alsace, France. It was built in 2016 and it is the home ground of USL Duppigheim with a capacity of 500 seats. It is named after the former manager of the Premier League team Arsenal, Arsène Wenger who grew up in nearby Duttlenheim.

== History ==
USL Duppigheim initially played their home at Rue de Stade in Duppigheim, though Stade Arsène Wenger was built to replace it. The location that Stade Arsène Wenger built upon used to be a farmer's field mostly used for growing potatoes. In 2016, a new 500-seat stadium was built on the site of this field at a cost of €750,000 (£580,000). To commemorate his contribution to football, it was named after Arsenal manager Arsène Wenger. The stadium is located 3 kilometres (1.9 mi) between Duppigheim and Duttlenheim but is considered to be administratively in Duppigheim. Duppigheim residents jokingly stated "who will tell the guys in Duttlenheim?" upon the news that the stadium named after Wenger would be in Duppigheim.

The stadium was opened by Wenger in May 2016 in front of 600 people. During the ceremony, he stated that he recalled: "When I was little, this stadium was a field of potatoes. Now it looks like Wembley." Wenger also stated that "It’s an honour. I am a little surprised." The USL Duppigheim chairman Peter Troesch stated that it was an "easy choice" and proclaimed that "He [Wenger] deserves to have one in every village in Alsace and France."
