= Arsène Wenger =

French football manager (born 1949)

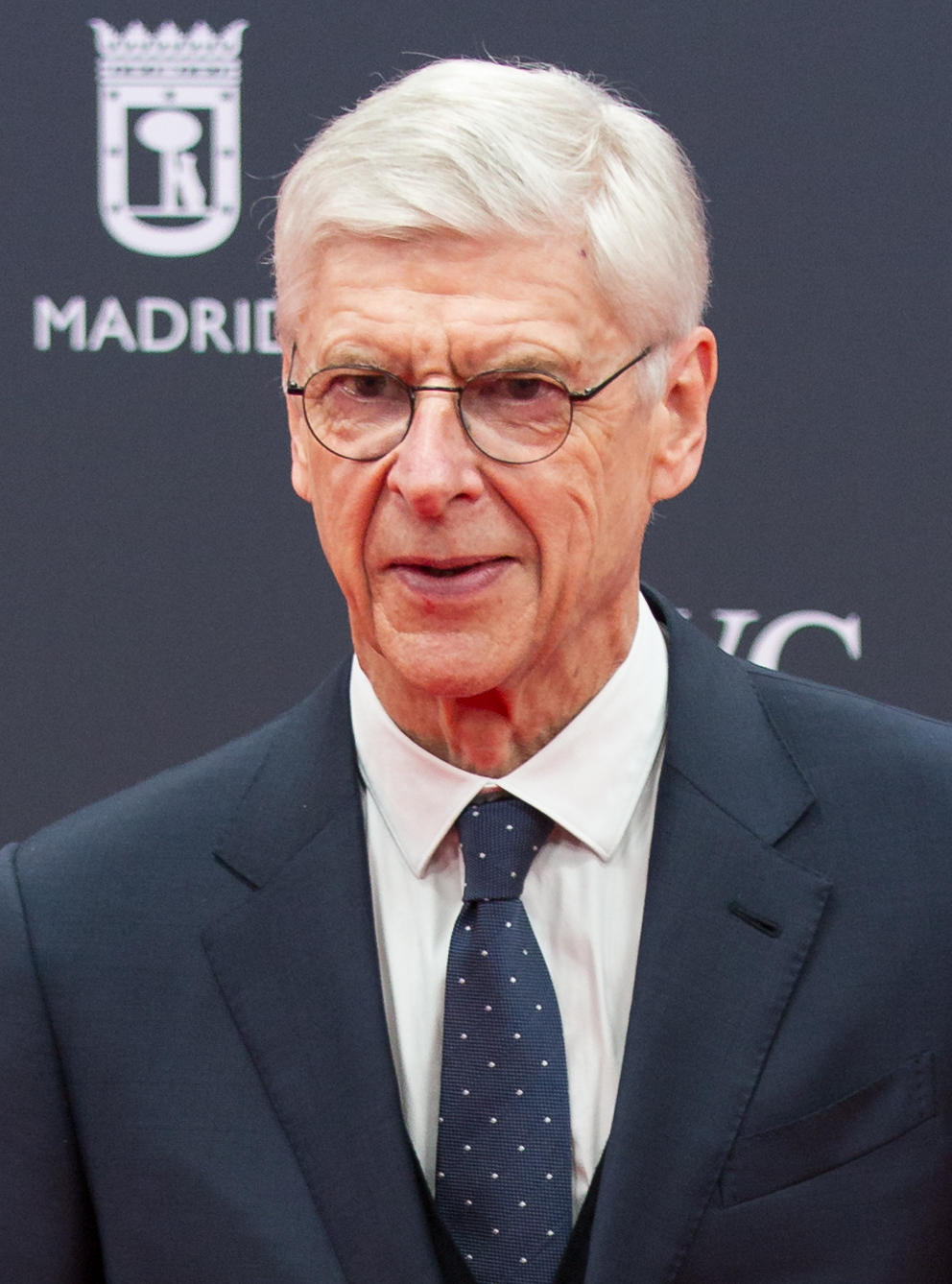
- Wenger in 2024

Chief of Global Football Development of FIFA
- Incumbent
- Assumed office 13 November 2019
- President: Gianni Infantino
- Preceded by: Office established

Personal details
- Born: Arsène Charles Ernest Wenger; 22 October 1949 (age 77) Strasbourg, Bas-Rhin, France
- Height: 1.91 m (6 ft 3 in)
- Occupation: Football manager, football administrator
Association football career
- Position: Midfielder
Youth career
- 1963–1969: FC Duttlenheim
- 1969–1973: Mutzig
Senior career*
Years	Team	Apps	(Gls)
1969–1973	Mutzig	–	(–)
1973–1975	Mulhouse	56	(4)
1975–1978	ASPV Strasbourg	–	(–)
1978–1981	RC Strasbourg	11	(0)
Total		67+	(4+)
Managerial career
- 1984–1987: Nancy
- 1987–1994: Monaco
- 1995–1996: Nagoya Grampus Eight
- 1996–2018: Arsenal
- * Club domestic league appearances and goals

Arsène Charles Ernest Wenger (born 22 October 1949) is a French former football manager and player who has been serving as FIFA's Chief of Global Football Development since 2019. Nicknamed Le Professeur, he is widely regarded as one of the most influential football managers of his generation. Wenger was the manager of Arsenal from 1996 to 2018, becoming the longest-serving and most successful manager in the club's history and the longest-serving manager in the history of the Premier League.

Born in Strasbourg and raised in Duttlenheim, Wenger was introduced to football by his father, the manager of the local village team. After a modest playing career as a midfielder, with appearances for clubs including FC Mulhouse and RC Strasbourg, he obtained a manager's diploma in 1981. Wenger began his managerial career at Nancy in 1984 before joining Monaco in 1987. At Monaco, he won the French league title and the Coupe de France in 1991. In 1995, Wenger moved to Japan to manage Nagoya Grampus Eight, where he won both the Emperor's Cup and the Japanese Super Cup.

In 1996, Wenger was appointed manager of Arsenal. Initially greeted with scepticism by the English media, he went on to transform the club and English football through innovations in nutrition, training methods, and global scouting. He became the first foreign manager to win a Premier League and FA Cup double in 1998, repeated the feat in 2002, and led Arsenal to an unbeaten league title in 2004. His team later set an English record of 49 consecutive league matches unbeaten. Under Wenger, Arsenal reached their first UEFA Champions League final in 2006 and relocated from Highbury to the Emirates Stadium. Financial constraints following the move contributed to a nine-year trophy drought, though Wenger later guided the club to further FA Cup victories in the 2010s, becoming the competition's most successful manager with seven wins. He stepped down as Arsenal manager in 2018 and retired from club management.

Wenger is credited with reshaping English football culture and modernising the managerial profession, though his teams were occasionally criticised for tactical naivety and disciplinary issues. Wenger is also noted for his emphasis on youth development and talent identification throughout his career.

== Early life ==
Arsène Charles Ernest Wenger was born on 22 October 1949 in Strasbourg, Bas-Rhin, the youngest of three children born to Alphonse and Louise Wenger. He lived in Duppigheim during the 1950s, but spent most of his time in the neighbouring village of Duttlenheim, 16 km (10 miles) south-west of Strasbourg. Arsène's father, Alphonse, like many Alsatians, was conscripted into the German Army by force following Germany's earlier annexation of the French region of Alsace-Lorraine. He was sent to fight on the Eastern Front in October 1944, at the age of 24.

The Wenger family owned an automobile spare parts business and a bistro named La Croix d'Or. In his book, My Life in Red and White, Wenger says the "alcohol, brawling and violence" of the bistro's patrons sparked his early interest in human psychology. His parents had difficulty looking after their children, but Duttlenheim was a village where everyone took care of the young; Wenger compared it in later years to a kibbutz. Before Wenger started school, he expressed himself in the local Alsatian dialect of Low Alemannic German. The primary school which Wenger attended was run by the Catholic Church, and as one of its brightest students, he later was accepted into a secondary school in Obernai.

According to his father, who also managed the village team, Wenger was introduced to football "at about the age of six". He was taken to games in Germany, where he held an affection for Borussia Mönchengladbach. Alsace was an area steeped in religion; Wenger and the village boys often needed to seek permission from the Catholic priest to miss vespers in order to play football.

== Playing career ==
Because the population of Duttlenheim was short in numbers, it proved difficult to field a team of 11 players of equal ages; Wenger did not play for FC Duttlenheim until the age of 12. Claude Wenger, a teammate of Arsène's, noted his lack of pace as a player, which he made up for with his "ability to guard the ball, [seeming] to have a complete vision of the pitch and having an influence among his team-mates", according to Marcel Brandner, the president of FC Duttlenheim. As a young teenager, he was called Petit; the nickname ceased when he had a growth spurt and broke into FC Duttlenheim's first team, aged 16. The team did not have a coach to prepare the players tactically, rather a person who supervised training sessions. Wenger took it upon himself to manage the side, with Claude stating "Arsène wasn't the captain and yet he was. It was 'You do this, you do that, you do this, you do that.' He was the leader".

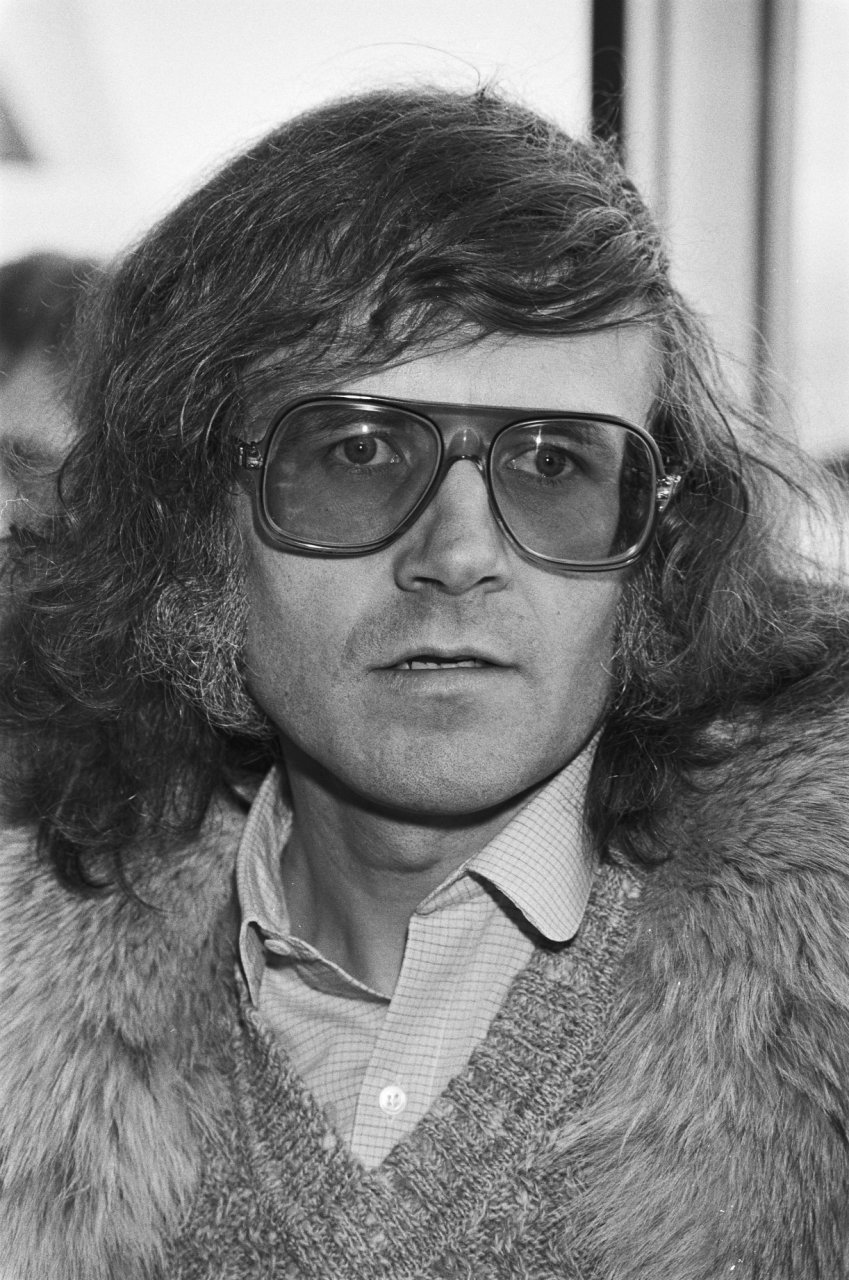
Wenger's manager at RC Strasbourg, Gilbert Gress

In 1969, Wenger was recruited to nearby third division club Mutzig. The club was famed for playing the "best amateur football" in Alsace and managed by Max Hild, who would later go on to become Wenger's mentor. Wenger's emergence at Mutzig aged 20 was considered too late for him to build a reputable playing career. Football was not seen as his future; the plan was for him to run the family's spare parts business. He was, however, of the age to start increasing his tactical knowledge of the sport. He frequently read France Football and alongside Hild made trips to Germany to watch Bundesliga matches and observe the different managerial styles. During Wenger's three years at Mutzig, the club beat Strasbourg 3–0 to win the Coupe d'Alsace. He also represented Alsace in a competition held annually between the regional leagues.

Wenger took his studies further, and in 1971 enrolled at the Faculté des sciences économiques et de gestion (Faculty of Economic and Management Sciences) at the University of Strasbourg to read politics and economics after a brief stint in medicine. In 1973 he joined semi-professional club Mulhouse and balanced his football career with his education. Wenger completed an economics degree (Note: The academic degree awarded to Wenger is ambiguous. Several publications, such as The Independent and The Economist have commented that he completed a master's degree (maîtrise) in economics (sciences économiques). Others, such as French magazine FF Sport U imply that Wenger was awarded a Licence. The Sunday Mirror state that he holds an additional degree in electrical engineering, but no such information is given on his Arsenal profile or shared in publicised interviews. Wenger is also said to have spent a six-month placement at Stanford University, according to the Evening Standard, who interviewed his parents.) a year later. He was selected to represent the national French students squad and visited Nigeria, Lebanon, and Uruguay – where the World Students Championship was held in 1976. Wenger did not participate in the event as he was injured; Jean-Luc Arribart, captain of the team recalled: "By the end of that trip, Arsène had almost taken on the role of assistant coach and team joker rolled into one."

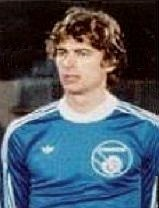
Trading card of Wenger with Strasbourg in 1979. Issued by Panini.

At Mulhouse, Wenger was managed by Paul Frantz, who also had a profound impact on his career. It was he who formalised Wenger's beliefs on the importance of nutrition, isometrics and working on a player's strong points. Wenger played in midfield for Mulhouse, often positioned on the right. In their final game of the 1974–75 season, the club beat Nancy to avoid relegation, but shortly afterwards, Frantz resigned. Wenger also made the decision to leave, as the regular commutes to Mulhouse from Strasbourg overwhelmed him. In 1975, he rekindled his friendship with Hild and signed for amateur club ASPV Strasbourg (Vauban). Hild needed a midfielder "who could organise play and also have a sort of hold over the team" and decided to recruit Wenger. Vauban was formed in 1971, and made steady progress up the French football league system thereafter; Wenger's three seasons at the club culminated with promotion to the third division.

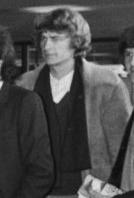
Wenger as a Strasbourg player in 1980

In 1978, Hild joined Strasbourg as coach of the reserve team. The role required him to scout, so Hild wanted an experienced player to work with the youth while he was away. Both Hild and Frantz recommended Wenger, which convinced manager Gilbert Gress to appoint him. Wenger's playing career at the age of 28 began to wane, but he never anticipated a role in the first team. Working for Strasbourg, however, presented him his first full-time job at the club he supported as a young boy. Hild moved Wenger from midfield to central defence, where he was positioned as a sweeper in reserve games. In November 1978, he made his debut for the first team against MSV Duisburg in the UEFA Cup (a match Strasbourg lost 4–0) and a month later, Wenger played against champions Monaco in the First Division. At the end of the 1978–79 season, RC Strasbourg won the league; Wenger did not join in the celebrations as he was preoccupied with the youth team. He made his final appearance for the senior side in 1979.

Wenger spent the last two years of his playing career predominantly running Strasbourg's reserve and youth team. He became conscious of the importance of speaking English, and during his holidays enrolled on a three-week language course at the University of Cambridge. Wenger also studied for his coaching badge at the Centre de ressources, d'expertise et de performance sportives (CREPS) in Strasbourg – this consisted of a course to coach children, followed by an intensive six-day course which led up to the national coaching badge. The latter programme took place in Vichy, and was spread over three weeks, allowing Wenger to be able to put Frantz's teachings of isometrics into practice. In 1981, he received his manager's diploma in Paris.

== Managerial career ==
=== 1984–1994: Nancy and Monaco ===
Wenger's management skills at Strasbourg impressed many French coaches, and he moved to Ligue 2 club Cannes in 1983, where he became Jean-Marc Guillou's assistant. Earning a steady wage of £300 per week, he was responsible for collecting information about opposition teams, and instilled discipline in the players through training sessions. Wenger's commitment to football was well documented; when asked what the young coach did during his spare time, general manager Richard Conte replied: "Videos, videos, videos. He was always watching videos of his opponents, of his own team. It didn't matter what time of night." Cannes failed to win promotion to Ligue 1, but they reached the quarter-finals of the Coupe de France. Wenger's work in raising the standard of the squad did not go unnoticed, and in 1984, he accepted Aldo Platini's offer to become manager of Nancy.

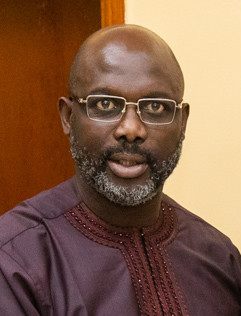
Ballon d'Or winner George Weah played under Wenger at Monaco, where he won the Coupe de France.

The challenge of sustaining Nancy as a Ligue 1 club was difficult as Wenger inherited a squad of sub-standard quality and he was given limited money to spend. He nevertheless relished the prospect of conducting business in the transfer market, and enjoyed freedom to trial theories he read about. In his first season at Nancy, Wenger hired a dietician to explain the benefits of healthy eating and made it imperative that players did not snack before games. He took the squad away from their usual summer training camp to Val Thorens, so that the players could acclimatise to the high-altitude. Platini attested the move to their strong league starts. From a managerial perspective, Wenger struggled to keep his emotions in check; losing made him "physically sick", to the point where he once stopped the team bus to vomit after a game. Wenger guided the club to a respectable 12th-place finish, all the more surprising given he constantly tinkered his team. Players were moved out of their favoured positions, which for some maximised their potential. Éric Bertrand, a striker signed from the lower divisions, was converted into a fullback, and by the end of Wenger's time at Nancy, Éric Di Meco switched from a left winger to wing back.

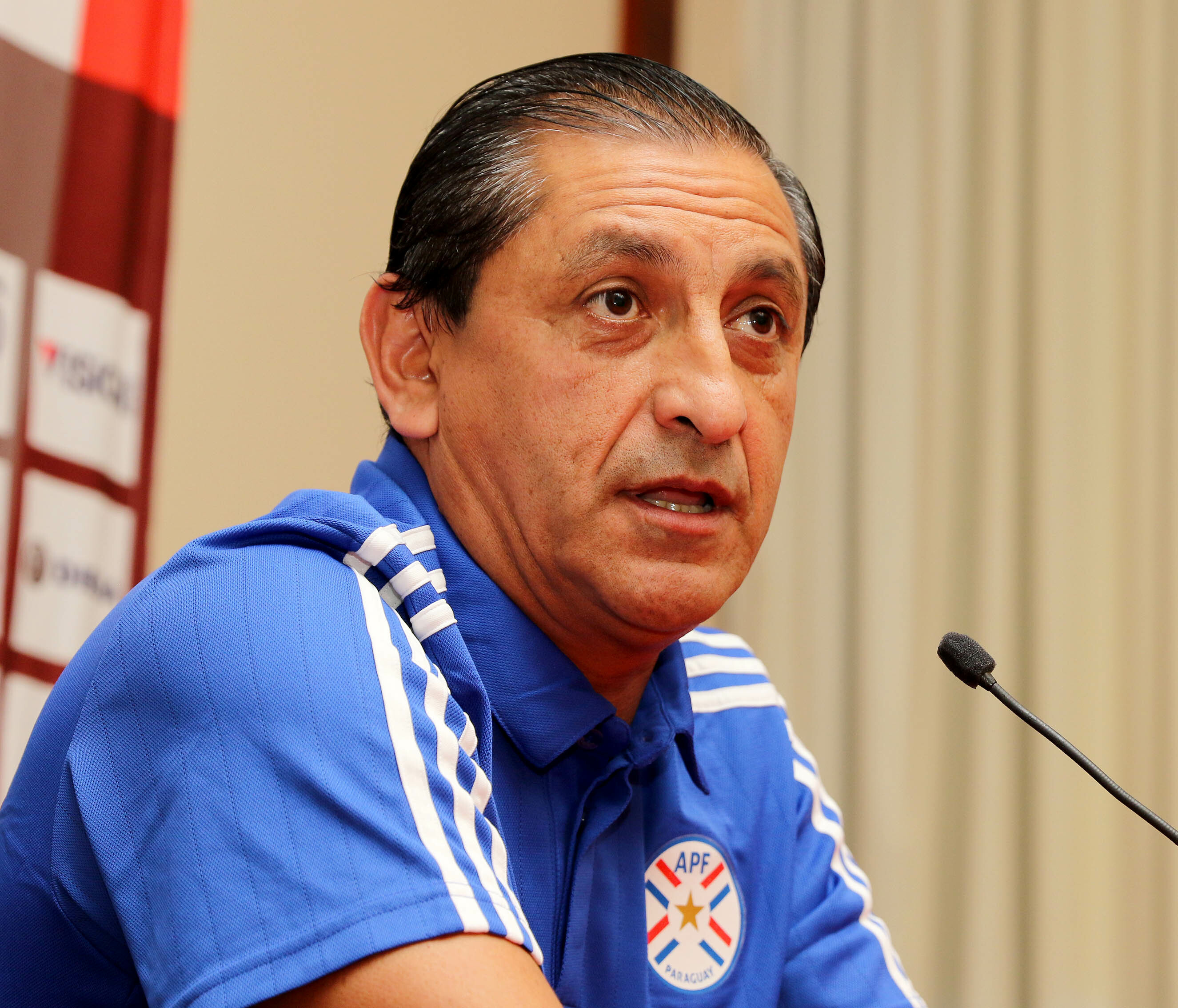
Argentine striker Ramón Díaz came to Monaco under Wenger in 1989.

Nancy's bottom-half finish proved a false dawn as the club finished 18th in the 1985–86 season, which meant they had to win a play-off match to avoid relegation. They retained their league status with a 3–2 aggregate win against Mulhouse. The club however sold several of their best players to avoid financial predicament and provided Wenger with little funds to work with. In Wenger's final season in charge, Nancy finished 19th and were relegated to Ligue 2. Despite the setbacks, he was contacted by Monaco over their vacant managerial job. Talks had begun during the summer of 1986, but Nancy chairman Gérard Rousselot refused to release Wenger from his contract, and Monaco were not prepared to offer compensation. Once Nancy's relegation was confirmed, Wenger was permitted to leave the club by mutual consent and was confirmed as Monaco manager in 1987.

Before joining Monaco, Wenger had identified several players to build his desired team. Tottenham Hotspur midfielder Glenn Hoddle, granted a free transfer, and Patrick Battiston, out of contract at Bordeaux, were signed. Striker Mark Hateley left Milan to join Monaco and was "encouraged to learn" that his fellow Englishman Hoddle would play in the same side as him. Monaco won the league in Wenger's debut season, six points ahead of runners-up Bordeaux. Although the team scored more goals in 1988–89 due to the purchase of Liberian striker George Weah, Monaco failed to retain the league and finished third behind Marseille and Paris Saint-Germain. The club reached the final of the Coupe de France, the national knockout cup competition in the same season, but lost 4–3 to Marseille.

Monaco again finished third in 1989–90; striker Ramón Díaz scored 15 goals in his first season at the club. The club beat league winners Marseille in the Coupe de France final through a last-minute goal from substitute Gérald Passi. In 1991–92, Monaco finished in second place and lost the 1992 European Cup Winners' Cup Final 2–0 to Werder Bremen. Although Monaco acquired the services of German striker Jürgen Klinsmann, the club could not regain the championship and concluded the subsequent seasons in third and ninth positions. Monaco did reach the semi-finals of the Champions League in April 1994, but lost to eventual winners Milan. As a result of his work at Monaco, Wenger was sought after by German club Bayern Munich, who wanted him to be their next manager. Monaco refused to let him leave and Wenger chose to stay, but a poor start to the 1994–95 season meant he was dismissed on 17 September 1994, with the team in 17th spot in the table. In 2001, Wenger said that the impact of bribery and corruption had influenced his decision to leave France, as Marseille were found guilty of match fixing in 1994.

=== 1994–1996: Nagoya Grampus Eight ===
Shortly after his dismissal, Wenger travelled to the United Arab Emirates to attend a series of conferences held by FIFA. Wenger was a member of the football governing body's technical committee, responsible for analysing the 1994 World Cup, and made a presentation to coaches of emerging football nations. His speech was closely followed by Japanese delegates, whose country had invested millions into the restructuring of its football league system. Representatives of Toyota, the majority owner of Nagoya Grampus Eight soon met with Wenger and offered him the chance to become the club's manager. Wenger deliberated, even though the idea of working abroad appealed to him; negotiations between the two parties lasted for two months. In that time, he sought the advice of his closest friends and family, and flew to Japan to watch Nagoya Grampus' striker Gary Lineker make his final appearance before his professional retirement. In December 1994, Wenger agreed to become manager of Nagoya Grampus, on a two-year contract worth ¥75m annually.

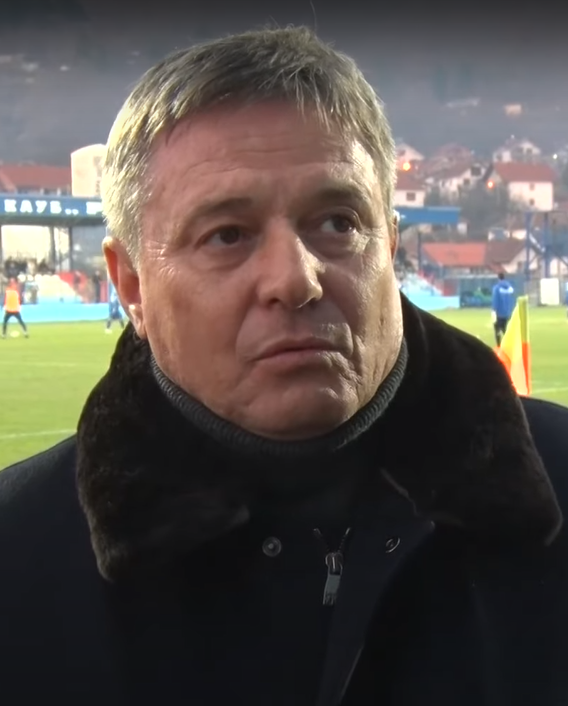
Dragan Stojković flourished under Wenger's guidance at Nagoya Grampus.

With the new season of the J.League commencing in March 1995, Wenger set about assembling his squad and backroom staff. He hired former Valenciennes manager Boro Primorac, whom he had befriended during the match-fixing scandal, as his assistant. Alexandre Torres joined Nagoya after Wenger identified the defender by watching Brazilian football on the television, and the manager brought in Franck Durix and his former player Passi. Nagoya finished bottom of the J.League the season before Wenger's arrival, and continued their poor form into the following campaign, losing several matches in a row. In response to the situation, Wenger altered his managerial style, becoming less amicable with his players and openly questioning their desire. To boost morale, he took his squad to Versailles for their mid-season break, where they went through a rigorous, but creative, training regime. Players were expected to make decisions for themselves on the pitch, instead of relying on the manager; Wenger was reported to have shouted to his players "Don't look at me to ask me what to do with the ball!" and "Decide for yourself! Why don't you think it out?" One player who greatly benefited from Wenger's guidance was Dragan Stojković, a midfielder whose disciplinary record improved considerably.

Wenger's methods had the desired effect – Nagoya won 17 of their following 27 games to finish runners-up in 1995. He shortly received the J. League Manager of the Year award for 1995, while Stojković claimed the player's honour. In January 1996, Wenger guided the club to their first piece of silverware as Nagoya defeated Sanfrecce Hiroshima to win the Emperor's Cup. Two months later they triumphed in the Super Cup, beating Yokohama Marinos 2–0. The success bolstered Nagoya's status in Japanese football, as well as Wenger's reputation; he was somewhat startled by the praise and idolisation that came his way. Midway through the 1996 league season, Wenger's former club Strasbourg enquired about the possibility of him returning to manage them. He turned down the offer, as he had been approached by Arsenal. David Dein had remained in contact with Wenger after their first meeting, and frequently sent him video tapes of matches to garner his opinions; "He was my personal pundit," the vice-chairman recalled. The Arsenal board rebuffed Dein's suggestion to appoint Wenger as early as 1995, but concerns over George Graham's successor Bruce Rioch meant they were more open-minded about hiring him since his stint in Japan.

Wenger managed Nagoya for the final time on 28 August 1996 and delivered a farewell speech, thanking the fans in Japanese. Assessing his time in Japan, biographer Jasper Rees felt Wenger had left a mixed legacy at the club, as the immediate success was followed by fluctuating league finishes; it was not until 2010 that Nagoya (under Stojković) won their first title. Wenger continued to speak fondly of his career in Japan, and once likened the country to his ancestral home: "It has beautiful things that we have lost in Europe, beautiful things that make life good." He also credited the culture for improving his temperament and rediscovering his passion for the game. Wenger returned to Japan as a television pundit for the 2003 FIFA Confederations Cup, and a decade later, took Arsenal to face Nagoya in a pre-season friendly.

=== 1996–2018: Arsenal ===
==== 1996–1997: Appointment and first season ====
In August 1996, Arsenal dismissed Bruce Rioch as club manager. Rioch's position had become untenable after a dispute with the board over transfers, and his working relationship with Dein worsened during the course of his tenure. Arsenal appointed Stewart Houston and later Pat Rice in temporary charge of the first team, while they searched for a full-time successor. Although Barcelona player and manager Johan Cruyff was favourite to take over, the board looked elsewhere, eventually backing Dein's proposal to hire Wenger. The appointment was delayed for several weeks as Wenger was under contract at Nagoya Grampus and the club wanted time to make a final decision. In the meantime, the Arsenal board refused to confirm the identity of their next manager, but speculation grew that it would be Wenger once the club signed French midfielders Patrick Vieira and Rémi Garde. On 22 September 1996, Wenger was unveiled as Arsenal manager, after Nagoya Grampus granted him his release. He officially assumed the role on 1 October 1996, becoming the first Frenchman to manage in the Premier League. At his first press conference, he told reporters: "The main reason for coming is that I love English football, the roots of the game are here. I like the spirit round the game and at Arsenal I like the spirit of the club and its potential."

"At first, I thought: What does this Frenchman know about football? He wears glasses and looks more like a schoolteacher. He's not going to be as good as George [Graham]. Does he even speak English properly?"

— Arsenal captain Tony Adams.

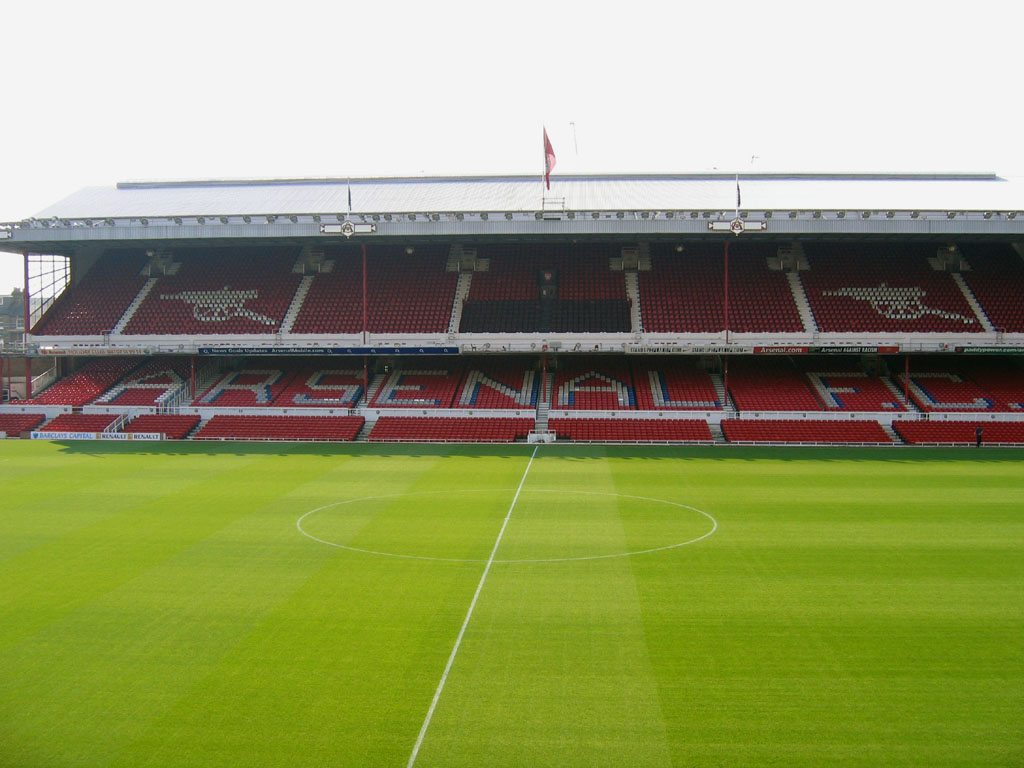
Wenger's unveiling took place at Highbury in September 1996.

Wenger's arrival at Arsenal was greeted with perplexity by some of the club's players, supporters and the local media. (Note: It is a common misconception that the Evening Standard greeted Wenger's appointment with the headline "Arsène Who?", when in actual fact it was printed on its billboard. The newspaper instead ran a piece that explained how to pronounce his name.) Although he was touted as a future technical director of The Football Association (FA), he was relatively unknown in English football. Glenn Moore's report in The Independent, dated 24 September 1996, highlighted the mood: "It is a measure of the insularity of the English game that when Arsène Wenger's name emerged as Arsenal's favoured candidate for their vacant manager's job many supporters were asking: 'Arsène who?'" Unlike his predecessors, Wenger was given control over transfers, contracts and training sessions, and the Arsenal board chose not to meddle in team affairs. One of his first acts as manager was to assure the experienced players they had a future at the club, but he noted the squad was "a bit tight," and needed competition for places. Wenger adopted a hands-on approach to training sessions which energised the squad, and made steps to change the drinking culture that afflicted Arsenal. Although he initially allowed players to have a pint of beer, they were forbidden to drink on days off and in the players' lounge. He later banned his players from casually drinking together. Wenger also promoted pasta as the pre-match dish, encouraged boiled chicken instead of red meat and discouraged junk food. Players received optional vitamin injections and Creatine, which reduced fatigue and improved their stamina.

Wenger's first match was a 2–0 away victory over Blackburn Rovers on 12 October 1996, however, he did suggest "one or two changes" to Rice in Arsenal's UEFA Cup defeat to Borussia Mönchengladbach on 24 September, nine days prior to taking charge of the club. The interference upset club captain Tony Adams, who on his first meeting with the manager expressed his disappointment: "I said to him that he had put our entire season in jeopardy by doing what he had done." Wenger chose to take the criticism on board upon arrival, and made an effort listening to Adams' assessment of the club. This particular approach of management resonated with the other players, who were sceptical of his ideas at first. The English players often set up pranks on Wenger to relieve hostility and nicknamed him "Inspector Clouseau", due to his clumsy nature. Adams said his sense of humour helped build team spirit: "Not only does Wenger love a good laugh, but he can laugh at himself. He is this gangly wise man".

Malicious rumours concerning Wenger's private life surfaced during November 1996, to the extent that the City of London reported that his exit from Arsenal was imminent. Having returned from a trip to Strasbourg to visit his parents, Wenger attended a press meeting and strongly refuted the claims: "If something comes out that is wrong, I will attack. It is a serious matter if you can just create things that are not right." Arsenal's press officer Clare Tomlinson, who was present at the news conference, recalled Wenger phoning the next day and demanding why he could not take action against the press for printing the story. The culprit responsible for spreading gossip in the City later apologised to Wenger. During this, Arsenal had led the Premier League, but poor form in February 1997 caused Wenger to rule out his team's chances of winning the title. They finished third in his first season, missing out on UEFA Champions League qualification to Newcastle United on goal difference – the tiebreaker used to determine the ranking between teams equal on points.

==== 1997–2001: Early success ====
In preparation for the forthcoming season, Wenger took the Arsenal squad to Austria, which would become the club's usual pre-season base. The players were given a night out as a reward for vigorous training, which midfielder Ray Parlour revealed was spent at a local pub with the other English players, while the "French lads" headed to the coffee shop and smoked. "How are we going to win the league this year? We're all drunk and they're all smoking," he recollected. Wenger continued to fine-tune the squad during this period. Having vetoed John Hartson's move to West Ham United in February 1997, he convinced French teenager Nicolas Anelka to join Arsenal. He raided his old club Monaco to acquire the services of Christopher Wreh, Gilles Grimandi and Emmanuel Petit. The latter two were defenders, but Wenger thought both were capable of playing in midfield. To address the shortcomings of playing expansive football, winger Marc Overmars was purchased from Ajax, while Paul Merson moved to Middlesbrough. Wenger assessed Arsenal lost the Premier League because of their poor home performances, and felt they needed more pace and power.

Arsenal began the 1997–98 season well, but struggled in November; though they beat Manchester United at Highbury without the suspended Dennis Bergkamp. This was their only league win throughout the month. Defeat at home to Blackburn Rovers left the club in sixth position before Christmas and seemingly out of contention for the title. Striker Ian Wright was booed off by supporters over his performance, which he responded to by criticising the crowd from the dressing room window. Wenger called for an urgent team meeting, where "home truths were spoken, fingers pointed, players were geed up." The squad dictated how the conversation went, which the senior defenders made it clear they wanted Vieira and Petit to provide cover.

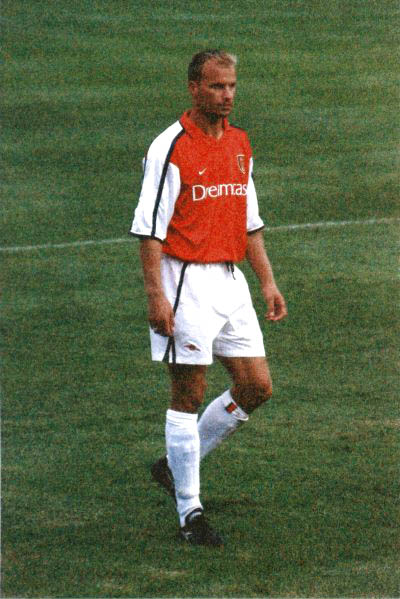
Dennis Bergkamp was a regular in Wenger's early teams.

Such was the likelihood of Manchester United going on to retain the title, bookmaker Fred Done paid out on punters with two months of the season left. Arsenal steadily closed the gap, however, and victory against Wimbledon in March 1998 set up a title clash between themselves and the reigning champions. Wenger in the lead up to the game maintained it was possible for Arsenal to win the league, stating "two or three weeks ago, the title was just a dream for us and people laughed when I said we could still do it". He suggested Manchester United were responsible for making the title race "interesting". At Old Trafford, Overmars scored the decisive goal to give Arsenal a 1–0 win. The victory was followed by nine consecutive league wins, the last of which was a home fixture against Everton that secured Arsenal's status as champions. Wenger became the first foreign manager to win the double, when his team beat Newcastle United in the 1998 FA Cup Final.

Wenger sanctioned Wright's transfer to West Ham in the summer and made Anelka his first-choice striker ahead of the 1998–99 season. His decision not to bolster Arsenal's attack, coupled with Bergkamp's fear of flying, meant the club entered the Champions League with just one recognised striker. Their time in the competition was brief, making an exit at the group stage, with their domestic form being indifferent. Needing to strengthen their attacking options, Arsenal signed Nwankwo Kanu in January 1999, and his presence reinvigorated the team as they embarked on a run similar to last season. They finished second behind Manchester United however, losing their slender advantage once they lost their penultimate match. United also eliminated Arsenal in a FA Cup semi-final replay after extra time; Wenger afterwards said: "it was a smashing game, and in the end, the luckiest won." In August 1999, Anelka joined Real Madrid, having threatened to strike if Arsenal did not grant him a move abroad. Wenger used a portion of the proceeds generated through the Anelka sale to fund the build of the Arsenal Training Centre, expressing his desire to establish a "home away from Arsenal". He renewed his forward line by signing Davor Šuker from Real Madrid, and Thierry Henry, who joined after seven "injury-interrupted" months at Juventus for £11.5 million. It was Wenger's intention to partner Anelka with Henry, but the former's departure meant the plan was scrapped.

The following seasons were comparatively barren. Arsenal again exited the Champions League at the group stage, but dropped down to the UEFA Cup. Wenger guided his team to the final, where they lost to Galatasaray on penalties. In the league, Arsenal finished 18 points behind Manchester United as runners-up, and though they closed the gap to eight points in 2000–01, they never posed a serious title challenge. The trophy drought continued past 2001, when Michael Owen scored two late goals for Liverpool to beat Arsenal in the FA Cup Final. Wenger rued his team's inability to make possession count, but refused to blame individuals, namely Henry, for missing chances.

==== 2001–2006: Second double, Invincibles, and leaving Highbury ====
The cup defeat prompted Wenger to make changes to his squad. He signed young England internationals Richard Wright and Francis Jeffers, midfielder Giovanni van Bronckhorst from Rangers as a partner for Vieira, and convinced defender Sol Campbell to join from local rivals Tottenham Hotspur on a free transfer. Campbell's arrival strengthened a defence which was going through a transition phase from 1999 and 2001; Steve Bould and Nigel Winterburn moved on in this period, club graduate Ashley Cole displaced Sylvinho as Wenger's first choice left back, while Lauren acted as Lee Dixon's understudy. Midfielders Freddie Ljungberg and Robert Pires – brought in during preceding transfer windows, had now established themselves into the first team. The 2001–02 season brought much success as Wenger led Arsenal to the double once more. The crowning moment was the win against Manchester United at Old Trafford in the penultimate game of the season. Sylvain Wiltord scored the winning goal to secure the club's 12th league championship and third double; four days earlier, Arsenal beat Chelsea 2–0 in the 2002 FA Cup Final. The team scored in every single league fixture and were unbeaten away from home that season.

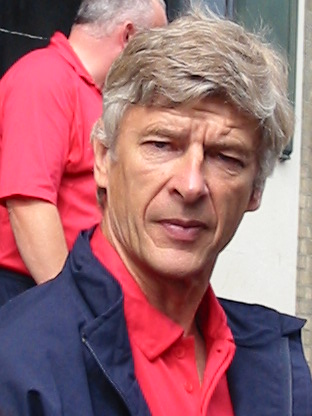
Wenger in 2003

Wenger appointed Vieira as club captain following Adams' retirement, and made few additions to his double-winning squad, signing defender Pascal Cygan, midfielder Gilberto Silva and utility player Kolo Touré. He was confident his side would retain the league and told the media: "Nobody will finish above us in the league. It wouldn't surprise me if we were to go unbeaten for the whole of the season". (Note: Wenger reiterated his belief that Arsenal could go unbeaten in September 2002, telling reporters: "It's not impossible as AC Milan once did it but I can't see why it's so shocking to say it. Do you think Manchester United, Liverpool or Chelsea don't dream that as well?") Arsenal set a new top-flight record in their opening game of the 2002–03 season; a 2–0 victory against Birmingham City was their 14th league win in succession. They continued their fine start by overhauling Nottingham Forest's top-flight record of 22 away league matches without defeat and later surpassed Manchester United's Premier League total of 29 matches unbeaten. Arsenal lost to Everton in October 2002, which began a run of four matches without a win. Though Wenger's team built an eight-point lead over challengers Manchester United by March 2003, they were overhauled in the final weeks of the season. The title race shifted in United's favour when Bolton Wanderers came from behind to draw 2–2 against Arsenal. Wenger showed moments of exasperation during the match by loosening his tie and bellowing orders from the touchline. Journalist Phil McNulty wrote that Wenger's demeanour "spoke of someone who had the title in his grasp but now saw it slipping from his fingers". Arsenal beat Southampton 1–0 to retain the FA Cup at the end of the campaign.

During pre-season, Wenger arranged a meeting with the players to examine why they lost the league. Martin Keown felt the manager harmed their chances by boasting they could go the season unbeaten. "Look, I said that because I think you can do it. But you must really want it," was Wenger's reply, as he believed the squad had the right mixture of technique, intelligence and physique. Arsenal did little transfer business given the financial demands that came with their new stadium project; their only major signing was Jens Lehmann, who replaced David Seaman as goalkeeper. Wenger retained his best players, despite interest shown by Chelsea's new owner Roman Abramovich. Six games into the league season, Arsenal were involved in a brawl against Manchester United; the ill-feeling stemmed from Vieira's dismissal late on. Several players were charged and fined accordingly by the FA and Wenger apologised for his team's over-reaction. The team restored their image with an entertaining performance against Newcastle; Henry Winter in his match report wrote: "Henry's opening goal encapsulated all that is good about Arsenal, the slick passing and intelligent movement." Wenger led his side to league triumph without a single defeat – an accomplishment last achieved by Preston North End 115 years before, in the Football League. "Somebody threw me a T-shirt after the trophy was presented which read 'Comical Wenger says we can go the whole season unbeaten.' I was just a season too early!," he remarked during the club's victory parade.

Arsenal's run of 49 league games unbeaten came to an end with a 2–0 defeat at Manchester United on 24 October 2004. The team under Wenger's management enjoyed another relatively strong league campaign in 2004–05, but finished second to Chelsea, who ended the season 12 points in front. Consolation again came in the FA Cup; Arsenal defeated Manchester United on penalties, after a goalless final. The emergence of Cesc Fàbregas in the starting line-up prompted Wenger to sell Vieira to Juventus in July 2005. He noticed the two as a midfield pairing was ineffective, and felt keeping Fàbregas would benefit the club's future. The 2005–06 season marked the beginning of a transitional period for Arsenal as it was the club's final season at Highbury. The team finished fourth in the Premier League and outside the top two for the first time under Wenger's tenure. In the Champions League, Wenger assembled an inexperienced defence that reached the final, beating Real Madrid, Juventus and Villarreal and conceding no goals in the knockout stages. In the final against Barcelona in May 2006, Arsenal took an early lead but ultimately lost the match 2–1. The defeat also made Wenger the only manager to have been a losing finalist in each of UEFA's three main club competitions, having previously lost the UEFA Cup final with Arsenal in 2000 and the Cup Winners' Cup final with Monaco in 1992.

==== 2006–2011: Stadium move and transition ====
In the summer of 2006, Wenger oversaw Arsenal's relocation to the Emirates Stadium. During the construction phase, he described the move as "vital" to the club's financial future and believed Arsenal were better able to attract the best players. Moving to the new stadium, however, presented several problems in the short term, as the club prioritised financing it over the team. Wenger sold some of his experienced players such as Campbell, Lauren and Pires, sanctioned Cole's move to Chelsea in part exchange for defender William Gallas, and integrated young players like Theo Walcott and Alex Song into the first team. His youthful team contested the League Cup final in February 2007 and were the youngest to play in a major English cup final, averaging 21 years. They ultimately came up short against Chelsea, who won the match 2–1. Arsenal finished fourth in the 2006–07 league season; Wenger had ruled out their title chances following defeat to Bolton in November 2006. The team's lack of directness and efficiency of possession was a familiar theme during the campaign; Guardian journalist Daniel Taylor observed two matches into the league season: "The most watchable side are frequently the most frustrating. Arsenal are wonderfully incisive yet infuriatingly blunt."

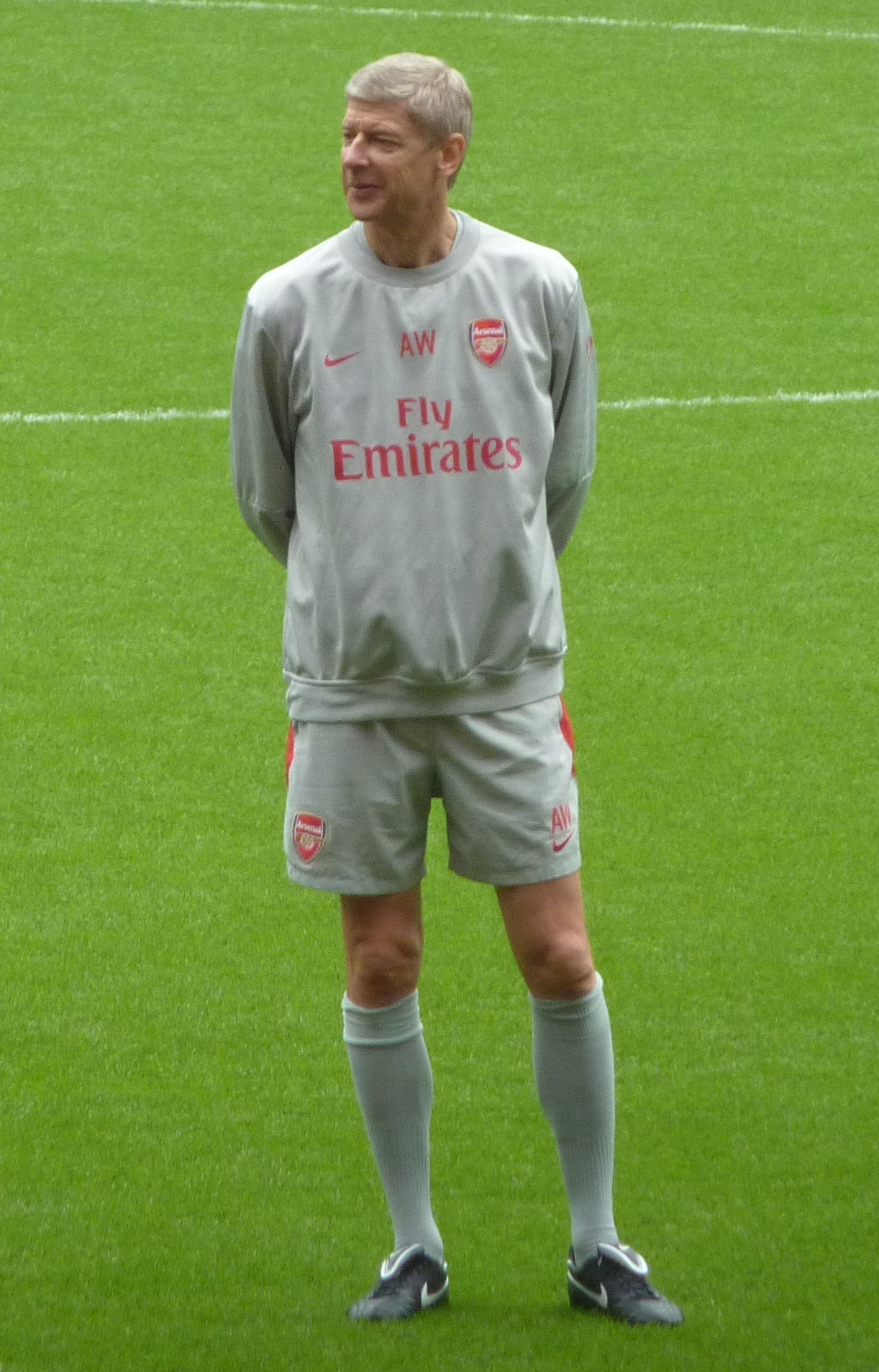
Wenger in training with Arsenal in 2009

In April 2007, Dein left Arsenal due to "irreconcilable differences" about the future of the club. Wenger described it as a "sad day for Arsenal," and sought assurances from the board over his future as well as reasons for Dein's departure. The instability at board level influenced club captain Henry's decision to leave Arsenal in June 2007, which led to uncertainty over Wenger's position. In September 2007, Wenger signed a new three-year extension, stating that he remained committed to "the club of my life." (In 2021, Wenger revealed that his signing of the contract extension was his side of a deal with the Arsenal board in the building of the new stadium, because he requested its construction.) Arsenal flourished in Henry's absence, with Emmanuel Adebayor, Mathieu Flamini and Fàbregas playing a more prominent role in the 2007–08 season. Defeat to Middlesbrough in December 2007 ended a run of 22 league matches unbeaten, but Arsenal soon built a five-point lead over Manchester United. A career-threatening injury to striker Eduardo against Birmingham City on 23 February 2008 acted as a turning point in Arsenal's season. Wenger, incensed at the aggressive tactics of opponents, called for a ban on tackler Martin Taylor in his post-match interview; he later retracted the comment. Arsenal's form subsequently suffered, and a run of three consecutive draws in March allowed Manchester United and Chelsea to overhaul them as they finished the season in third.

Arsenal made a troubled start to Wenger's twelfth season. The club relieved Gallas of his captaincy, after he openly questioned his teammates, and Wenger appointed Fàbregas as his successor. Arsenal secured fourth position in the league and reached the semi-finals of the Champions League and FA Cup, but it was a fourth season without silverware. Wenger was subject to criticism from Arsenal fans; he praised the travelling supporters, though referred to a section of the home crowd as treating him "like a murderer". Arsenal finished third in the league in 2009–10 and the team were eliminated in the quarter-finals of the Champions League by Barcelona. Wenger had reached a landmark in October 2009, surpassing George Allison to become Arsenal's longest-serving manager.

In August 2010, Wenger signed a further three-year contract to continue his managerial career at Arsenal. His team were on course for a quadruple trophy haul in 2010–11, before defeat to Birmingham City in the 2011 Football League Cup Final, when a mix-up between goalkeeper Wojciech Szczęsny and defender Laurent Koscielny allowed Obafemi Martins to score the winning goal. This was followed by a run of just two wins in eleven Premier League games, to take them from title contenders to a fourth-place finish. Arsenal then made exits in the FA Cup and the Champions League to Manchester United and Barcelona, respectively.

==== 2011–2018: Rebuilding, return of trophies, and departure ====
Wenger's preparations for the 2011–12 season were disrupted by player unrest. Though he insisted none of his top players would leave the club, Fàbregas eventually moved to Barcelona, while Gaël Clichy and Samir Nasri joined Manchester City. Suspensions and injuries left Wenger fielding an understrength side against Manchester United on 29 August 2011; Arsenal were trounced 8–2, which represented their worst defeat in 115 years. Needing to address the squad's lack of depth, Wenger completed a series of deals in the final days of the summer transfer window. He mostly brought in experienced players, such as Yossi Benayoun on loan from Chelsea, Everton's Mikel Arteta and Germany international Per Mertesacker. By October, Arsenal had made their worst start to a season in 58 years, losing four of their opening seven matches. However, the team soon harmonised and, in the same month, club captain Robin van Persie scored a hat-trick as Arsenal beat Chelsea 5–3. Despite another season of no silverware, Wenger guided Arsenal to third position in the Premier League, thus qualifying for the Champions League for a 15th successive campaign. Van Persie had scored 37 goals, in his first injury-free season for the club. He, however, grew disillusioned with Arsenal's transfer policy, and decided not to renew his contract, with one year remaining. When Manchester United manager Sir Alex Ferguson learnt of the situation, he called Wenger to push through a deal and Van Persie agreed to join Manchester United in August 2012. The club purchased strikers Olivier Giroud and Lukas Podolski in anticipation of the sale.

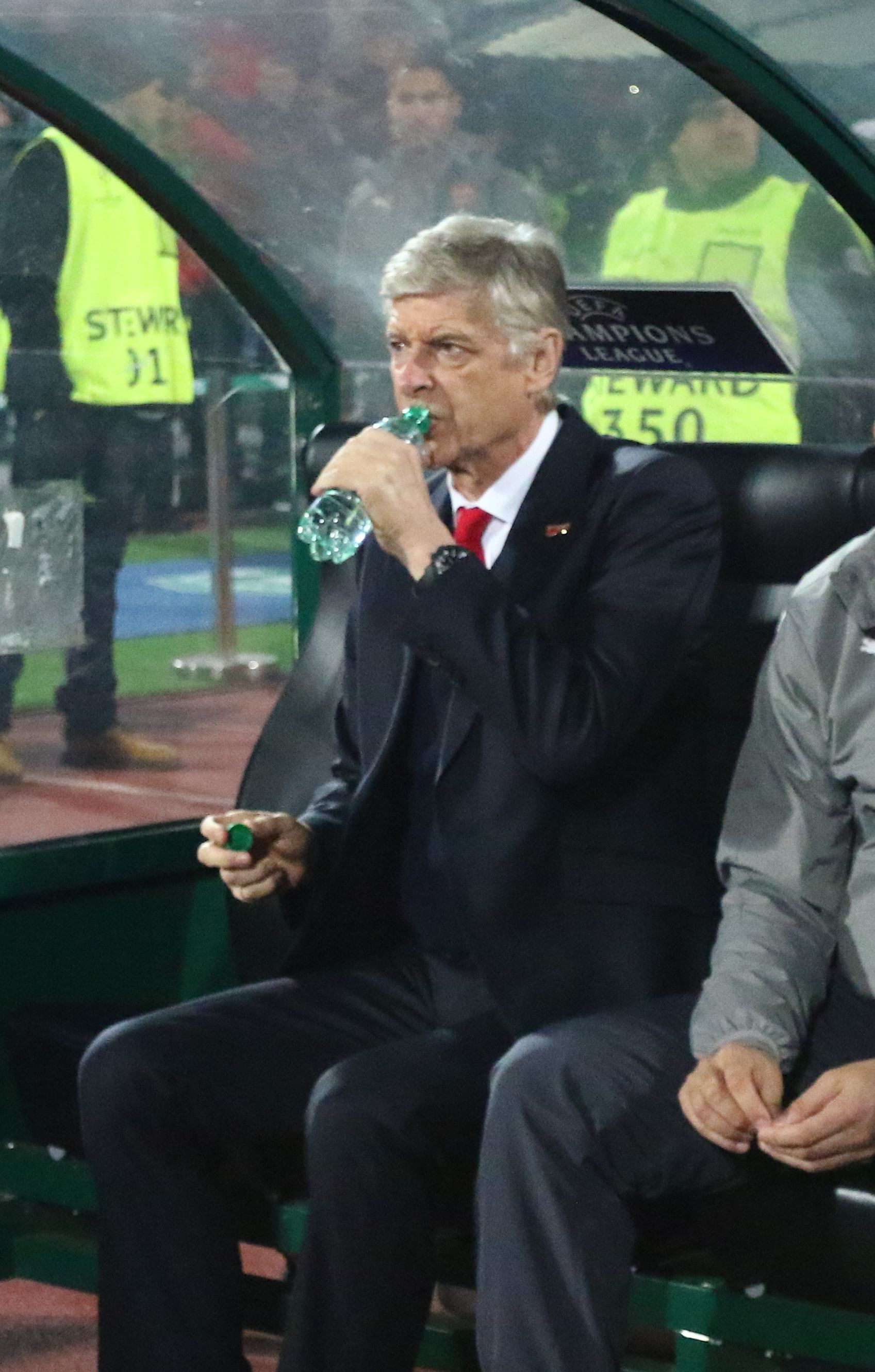
Wenger in 2016

The 2012–13 season was Wenger's first without Rice, who retired in late spring. Bould was named as his replacement, who specialised in defensive work. Arsenal struggled to find consistency in the league and were 12 points behind leaders Manchester United by November 2012. A month later, Wenger came under strong criticism following his side's exit in the League Cup to Bradford City, when a full-strength team lost on penalties to opposition three divisions below. Further cup defeats to Blackburn Rovers and Bayern Munich in the FA Cup and Champions League, respectively, ended Arsenal's trophy chances for an eighth consecutive season. Before the first leg, Wenger had criticised the media for reporting he was about to sign a contract extension, and said of the Blackburn game: "We lost it in the last 20 minutes, so there are a lot of superficial analyses that you cannot accept. Because one guy says something, everybody goes the same way".

Arsenal's aim of finishing in the top four appeared to be a difficult task by March, after defeat to Tottenham Hotspur. With ten league matches remaining, they were seven points behind their rivals, and Wenger said his side could not afford any more dropped points. He made changes to the side for their second leg against Bayern, dropping captain Thomas Vermaelen and Szczęsny, in place of Koscielny and Łukasz Fabiański. Though Arsenal were eliminated on the away goals rule, Wenger's adjustments worked in the league as his team went on a run to overhaul Tottenham for a second successive season. A win on the final day against Newcastle United secured fourth position, which Wenger described as a "relief".

Arsenal opened the 2013–14 season with a home defeat to Aston Villa, which prompted boos from the supporters. The club's transfer inactivity over the summer was criticised, but Wenger assessed: "We could have won the game today with the players on the pitch, I'm convinced of that." In the final week of the transfer window, he re-signed Flamini and sanctioned the club record signing of Mesut Özil from Real Madrid, totalling £42.5 million. Wenger was instrumental in the latter deal; he phoned and spoke to the German in his native language, convincing him that a move to England would enhance his career. Arsenal's form thereafter improved and Aaron Ramsey's goalscoring spree elevated the team to first position by the New Year. Poor performances in the big games, however, blighted Arsenal's title credentials, with a 6–0 loss to Chelsea at Stamford Bridge being described as "a good hiding [as] you don't prepare all week to experience that." The defeat marked Wenger's 1,000th match in charge of Arsenal. Arsenal consolidated fourth position in the league, and Wenger guided his team to FA Cup success, as they came from two goals down to beat Hull City in the final, and clinch Arsenal their first trophy in nine years. At the end of the season, Wenger signed another three-year extension to his Arsenal contract. He strengthened the squad by signing Alexis Sánchez from Barcelona in July 2014, who started in the 2014 FA Community Shield that Arsenal won by beating Manchester City 3–0, and during the course of 2014–15, Wenger promoted Francis Coquelin and Héctor Bellerín into the first team. Wenger won his sixth FA Cup in May 2015, which placed him alongside George Ramsay as the most successful manager in the competition's history. Wenger guided the club to an improved third place in the league that season, and the club saw further improvement in the 2015–16 season as they finished as league runners-up, while retaining the FA Community Shield by defeating Chelsea 1–0.

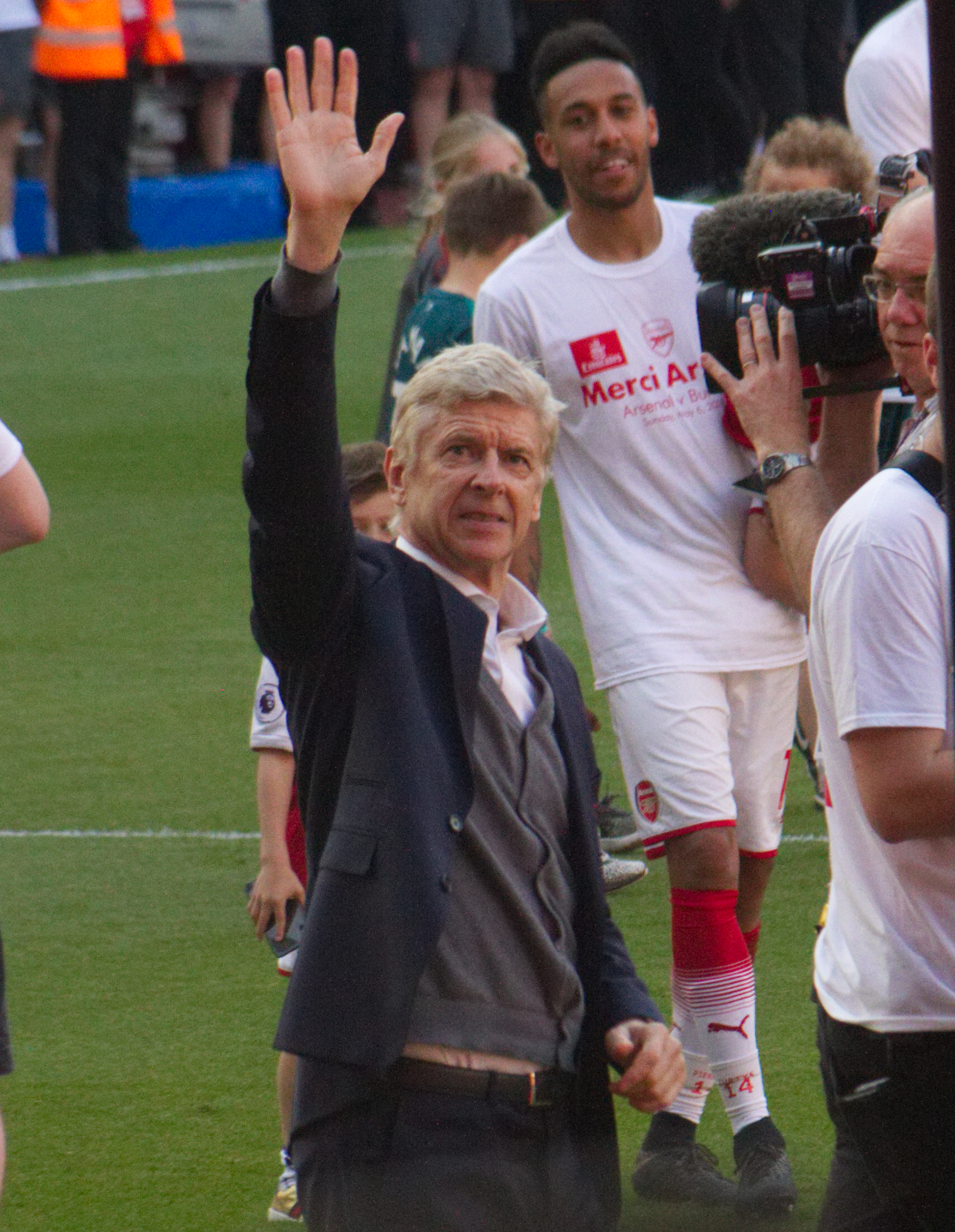
Wenger in his final home match as manager of Arsenal in 2018

Arsenal financed moves for Granit Xhaka and Shkodran Mustafi in mid-2016 for a combined £65 million, rendering the pair one of Arsenal's most expensive ever signings, as Wenger hoped to guide the club to their first league title win in over thirteen years the following season. Although Arsenal began strongly in the league, losing only once until December, back-to-back defeats to Everton and Manchester City resulted in Arsenal losing their stronghold on the league. Wenger also served a four-match touchline ban and had to pay a £25,000 fine after pushing referee Anthony Taylor during a win at home against Burnley. Further defeats to Chelsea and Liverpool all but rendered Arsenal out of the title race, and left qualification to the Champions League threatened by March. On 30 April, Arsenal lost to main rivals Tottenham which had confirmed the latter had finished above them in the Premier League for the first time since the 1994–95 FA Premier League season. The following month also saw them fail to finish in the top four since the 1996–97 FA Premier League season. On 27 May, Wenger became the most successful manager in the history of the FA Cup as Arsenal beat Premier League winners Chelsea 2–1 at Wembley through goals from Alexis Sánchez and Aaron Ramsey. The victory represented a further record for Wenger, as Arsenal too, became the most successful club in the competition's history as they won the competition for the 13th time. Four days following the win, Wenger signed a contract extension until 2019.

In mid-2017, Wenger brought in two signings; Alexandre Lacazette for a fee of £45m, the club's most expensive signing, and Sead Kolašinac on a free transfer from Schalke 04. On 6 August, Wenger won his seventh FA Community Shield as manager as Arsenal beat Chelsea 4–1 on penalties following a 1–1 score at full time. However, in the 2017–18 FA Cup, Arsenal lost to Nottingham Forest in the third round of the FA Cup, and again stood well outside the top four in the Premier League. The club also dealt with player unrest in the form of Sánchez, who voiced his desire to depart, and Wenger sanctioned a transfer to Manchester United in January 2018, whereby Arsenal received Henrikh Mkhitaryan in a swap-deal. Later that month, he signed Pierre-Emerick Aubameyang for a club-record fee of £56 million. However, these additions did not aid Arsenal's performances as a team, and on 20 April, Wenger announced he would step down as Arsenal manager at the end of the 2017–18 season. His final home game was a 5–0 win against Burnley on 6 May, where he received a standing ovation before the game and was gifted the gold mini-replica Premier League trophy he won during the 2003–04 Invincibles season as a departing gift from Arsenal. He officially concluded his tenure with a 1–0 away win against Huddersfield Town. Wenger later revealed that he wanted to stay at the club until the expiration of his contract, but the club thought it better he leave, with the board informing him in January of their decision to end his contract at the end of the season. He described the hostility he faced from the board and fans as "unjustified" and his exit as "very hard" and "very brutal".

== Career after management ==
From November 2019, Wenger became FIFA's Chief of Global Football Development, a role in which he is responsible for overseeing and driving the growth and development of the sport. He also takes senior authority as a member of the Football and Technical Advisory Panels involved in IFAB review giving judgement on rule changes mandated by FIFA. In this role, Wenger was also inducted chairman of FIFA's executive team which conducts technical analysis of official FIFA tournaments and delivers feedback. Following his departure from Arsenal, in a preview of his second book, he called the FIFA role "a new challenge". In 2019, Wenger invested in sports technology company Playermaker.

== Approach and philosophy ==
=== Tactics ===
Wenger was inspired by Borussia Mönchengladbach as a child, and was later influenced by Total Football, a playing style developed by Rinus Michels at Ajax in the 1970s. He recollected the team as having "perfect players everywhere and that was the sort of football I wanted to be playing myself". At Monaco, he employed a 4–4–2 formation, though he did trial 4–3–3, akin to Michels'. Wenger is an advocate of 4–4–2 as "no other formation is as efficient in covering space", but used it sparingly in his final seasons.

Arsenal's line up against Reading in November 2007. Wenger's decision to play Alexander Hleb further up in games increased the team's efficiency.

Throughout his managerial career, Wenger has trusted his players to perform and learn from their own mistakes, a quality Vieira regards as his biggest strength and weakness. Wenger encourages sportsmen to show intuition, and makes observations rather than explicitly giving orders. Campbell reflected that his former manager "puts a lot of onus on players to change the game" and "he wants certain players – especially in the last third – to be able to produce it and give something different". When Wenger joined Arsenal, he spoke of his desire to see "real, modern football. That means compact lines, of zones, of quick, coordinated movements with a good technique." He characteristically focuses on the strengths of his teams, rather than looking for areas to exploit the opposition.

"For me, football is first and foremost a game. It has a framework, yet should leave some part for freedom of expression. In France nowadays we seem to have found the right balance between team organisation and the freedom allowed to the player."

— Wenger in an interview with The Sunday Times, April 2004.

During a match against Borussia Mönchengladbach in 1996, Wenger presided over Rice's caretaker duties at Arsenal, and ordered the team to switch from their preferred 3–5–2 formation to 4–4–2. The tactical change did not have its desired effect, as Arsenal lost the game having led before Wenger's half-time instruction. For much of the 1996–97 season, Arsenal continued to play 3–5–2 as it was the only formation the defenders were comfortable with, as well as injuries unsettling the side. In Wenger's second season at the club, he reinstated 4–4–2 and focused on strengthening the front six, by signing wingers Overmars and Luís Boa Morte and partnering Vieira with Petit. According to Jonathan Wilson, the system was similar to 4–3–3, as Overmars often pushed higher up the field and Parlour played alongside Vieira and Petit to solidify the midfield. Needing to compensate deficiencies in attack the following season, Wenger relied on his experienced defence to direct games, which conceded 17 goals in 38 league matches. From then on, Wenger deployed an unconventional 4–4–2 with a greater emphasis on attack and movement; his teams between 2001 and 2004 were dominant on the left flank.

By the 2005–06 season, clubs in England were increasingly in favour of using the 4–5–1 system. Wenger, having earlier suggested he would never resort to a negative system, later adopted the formation for Champions League matches. The decision to pack the midfield and play a lone striker resulted in Arsenal reaching the final. With Fábregas breaking into the first team, Wenger chose to deviate from their counter-attacking style, to a more possession based one. In 2009–10, he instituted a fluid 4–3–3 formation to benefit from Fàbregas' creativity, and since the player's departure, had remodelled the system to 4–1–4–1 and 4–2–3–1. During the latter half of the 2016–17 Premier League season, Wenger switched to a 3–4–3 formation, similar to Antonio Conte's Chelsea first used against Middlesbrough in a 2–1 win.

Wenger proved able to implement his entertaining vision of football, particularly at Arsenal. His team's 5–1 win against Portsmouth in March 2004 was likened to "the magnificently fluid Ajax of the early 70s", and greeted with a standing ovation by the opposition supporters, as the Arsenal players left the field. Wenger's style of play, however, has been criticised for inefficiency and a lack of variation to go with technique. He is not renowned for making game-changing substitutions, nor had his tactics helped his teams overcome flexible opponents. His ideals are noticeably different from the pragmatic approach of his rivals, though he has assembled teams to produce disciplined performances, markedly the 2005 FA Cup Final against Manchester United. Defeats in the big games during 2013–14 led to Wenger compromising his attack-minded principles in favour of keeping it tight. The team's approach had been less predictable than when it was built around Fàbregas, with the initial predictability allowing Sir Alex Ferguson to devise a template to beat Arsenal, which involved "good players who can intercept".

=== Preparation ===
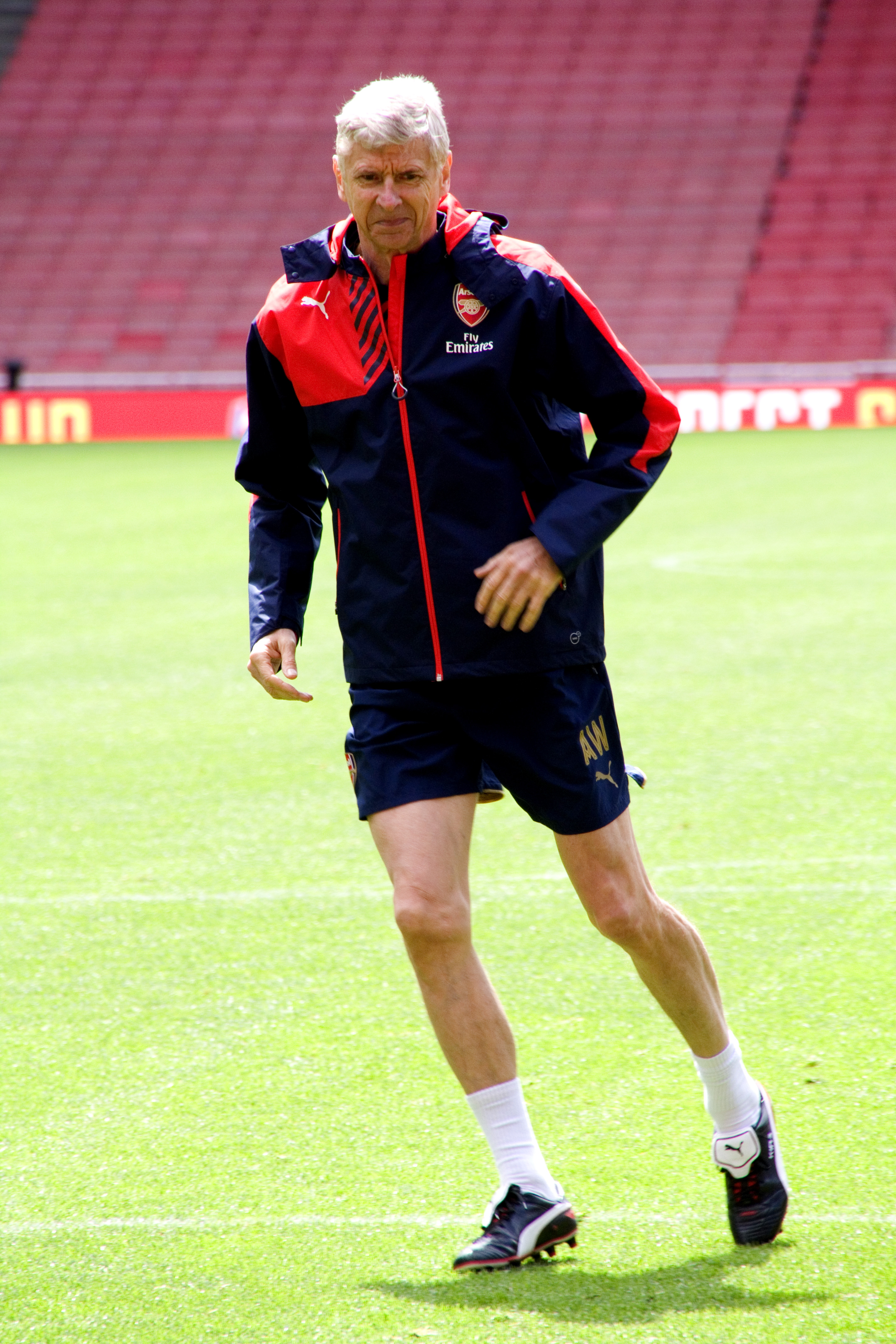
Wenger in 2015

Wenger led training sessions, but delegated responsibility to his coaching staff, who predominantly work with the players. He split the squad into groups, observing and supervising the drills. A typical training session under Wenger lasted 90 minutes, which was timed and staged precisely, and included co-ordination techniques, positional play and small-sided games. Wenger spent the day before a match focusing on the mental and tactical approach of his squad and varied his training style.

Wenger regarded a well-balanced diet as an essential part of a player's preparation. He was influenced by his time in Japan, where "the whole way of life there is linked to health. Their diet is basically boiled vegetables, fish and rice. No fat, no sugar. You notice when you live there that there are no fat people". At Arsenal, Wenger brought in dieticians to explain the benefits of a healthy lifestyle, and acquired the help of Philippe Boixel, an osteopath for the France national team, to realign the players' bodies each month. Plyometrics, exercises designed to strengthen the muscles, were introduced and Wenger routinely made players stretch before and after matches. Until 2004, he encouraged his players to take Creatine for increased stamina, later stopping when he noticed side-effects. The innovations had a desirable effect on the team as it prolonged the careers of his defence, and made Arsenal stronger in the second half of seasons. Though Wenger's methods were common in Italian football, they had been unsuccessfully trialled in England until his arrival. (Note: Graeme Souness, for instance in the early 1990s, changed the players' eating habits at Liverpool, introduced new training methods and monitored their lifestyles. Some of the senior players were unreceptive to his ideas at first; Ian Rush retorted "But we won the double on egg and chips," when told about the new menu. Souness' time at Liverpool was brief compared to his predecessors, lasting under three years.)

In later years, Wenger's training regime has come under criticism, given his squad's poor injury record. From 2004–05 to 2014–15, Arsenal's players lost 13,161 days through injury, the second most in the Premier League. In 2014, Wenger acquired the help of fitness coach Shad Forsythe to solve the problem; statistics revealed a year later that Arsenal's average injury length dropped more than 25% in Forsythe's first season.

=== Recruitment and spending policy ===
Youth development and scouring for talent abroad is central to Wenger's recruitment policy. He relies on a network of scouts and personal contacts to find and attract talented footballers to play under him. Wenger's strategy is aided by data; for instance, the decision to sign Flamini in 2004 came about as he was looking at statistics to find an understudy to Vieira. To examine the mental state of a young footballer, he uses psychometric tests conducted by psychologist Jacques Crevoisier once every two years. Wenger prides himself on nurturing talent, saying in an interview: "I believe one of the best things about managing people is that we can influence lives in a positive way. That's basically what a manager is about. When I can do that, I am very happy".

In his early managerial years, Wenger recognised the potential of football in Africa, which influenced his transfer dealings at Monaco. On the recommendation of Claude Le Roy, he signed Liberian George Weah, who later became the first African to be named FIFA World Player of the Year. Weah, while receiving his award from FIFA president João Havelange and vice-president Lennart Johansson invited Wenger up to the stage, spontaneously giving his medal to the manager, as a token of his appreciation. During his final years at Monaco, Wenger worked with Roger Mendy, a Senegalese defender regarded in 1991 as one of the ten best African footballers by France Football, and Nigerian Victor Ikpeba, a forward who earnt the accolade of African Player of the Year. Wenger also fast-tracked young players such as Petit and Lilian Thuram, and handed debuts to Henry and David Trezeguet.

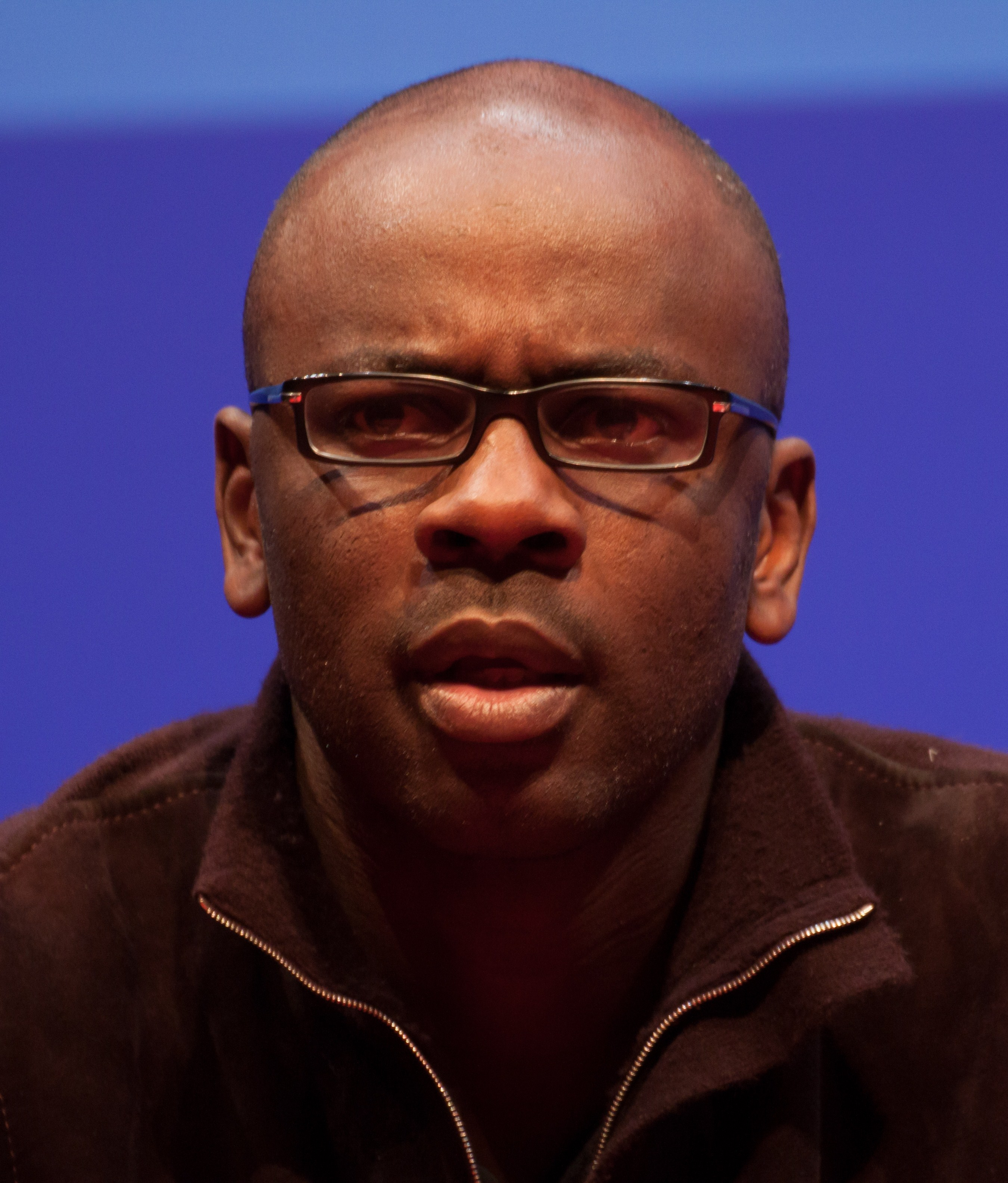
Lilian Thuram made his debut for Monaco under Wenger.

In England, Wenger has used his extensive knowledge of the European transfer market and rulings – particularly in his native France – to recruit players. His first purchase as Arsenal manager was Anelka from Paris Saint-Germain for £500,000, a deal which upset the French club as they received little remuneration. The player's subsequent sale to Real Madrid just two years later for £23.5 million highlighted Wenger's shrewdness in the transfer market. He remained in contact with Guillou's Abidjan-based academy, where he discovered future Arsenal players Touré and Emmanuel Eboué, and successfully persuaded Fàbregas and Héctor Bellerín, amongst other La Masia graduates, to leave Barcelona and join him. Wenger's recruitment of young players came under criticism from Bayern Munich chairman Karl-Heinz Rummenigge, who protested it was tantamount to child trafficking. Wenger refuted the analogy and said, "Look at Santa Cruz at Blackburn. Ask him what age he came to Bayern Munich. Then you have an answer for Rummenigge."

When Arsenal moved to the Emirates Stadium, Wenger prioritised investing in youth instead of purchasing experienced players. He described it as a way of creating an "identity" with Arsenal: "I felt it would be an interesting experiment to see players grow together with these qualities, and with a love for the club. It was an idealistic vision of the world of football." The departure of Dein, coupled with the saturation of the transfer market, meant Wenger struggled to recruit players as efficiently as before. The youth set-up did not replicate the success of the late 1990s and early 2000s, though Arsenal consistently finished fourth or higher in the league between 2006 and 2011. The club earnt a reputation of functioning as a "feeder club" to bigger teams, as Wenger struggled to keep hold of his best players. He described this period as "very sensitive" because of the financial restrictions that came with the stadium move. Since the 2011–12 season, Wenger has reverted to buying proven talent, and blended experience with youth in domestic cup competitions. Arsenal have benefited from increased revenue since the Emirates move, and negotiating new sponsorship deals has allowed Wenger to make marquee signings such as Özil, Sánchez, Granit Xhaka, Alexandre Lacazette and Pierre-Emerick Aubameyang.

Observing Wenger's transfer policy in 2009, Sir Alex Ferguson commented that it lacked balance and needed defensive players to solidify the Arsenal team. The players Wenger recruits have often been criticised for their character and leadership capabilities; footballer Joey Barton suggested it was because the manager discouraged them from commanding: "Sometimes you need someone to galvanise and that might be a shouter and bawler. It may not be Arsene's way, but I think they lack that." Wenger is perceived as frugal given his inactivity in transfer windows, but he has denied the stereotype: "Of course people say always to buy but you cannot make careers [and you cannot] buy every time you have an injured player. You know I have the wrong reputation. I'm not scared to spend money. The job of a manager is not to spend as much money."

== Relations with others ==
Wenger's relations with his fellow football managers and officials have not always been genial. In a joint-interview with The Times and Daily Mail in 2009, he explained that his reluctance to trust other managers had been mistaken for discourtesy: "There are managers I respect, and I respect what they do, but you cannot be completely friendly and open up." He is well known for his rivalry with former Manchester United manager Sir Alex Ferguson; beginning in 1997, the dispute reached its culmination in the "Pizzagate" incident at Old Trafford in October 2004. After Manchester United ended Arsenal's 49-game unbeaten Premier League run after being awarded a late penalty, Cesc Fabregas threw a pizza at the opposition in the tunnel. Wenger accused United striker Ruud van Nistelrooy of being "a cheat" in a post-match television interview, and was reprimanded with a £15,000 fine by the Football Association. Both managers later agreed to tone down their words, in an attempt to defuse the rivalry. In his autobiography, Ferguson wrote that the events of "Pizzagate" had "scrambled Arsène's brain" and caused their relationship to break down for almost five years. By 2009, Wenger noted his rivalry with Ferguson had become "respectful" as Arsenal had ceased competing with Manchester United for major honours.

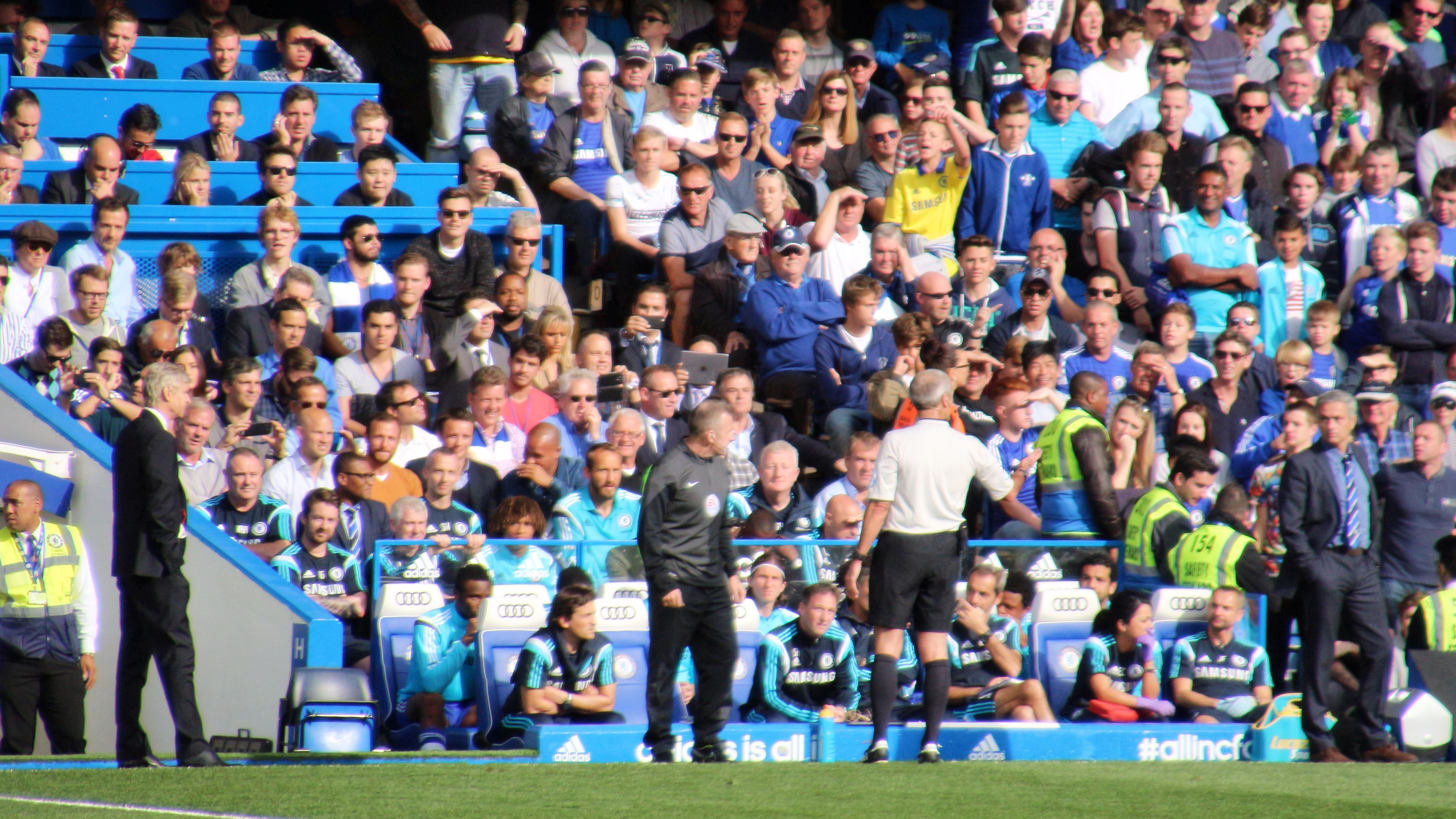
Wenger and Mourinho during a match between their teams in 2014

During October and November 2005, Wenger became embroiled in a war of words with Chelsea manager José Mourinho. Mourinho accused Wenger of having an "unprofessional obsession" with Chelsea and labelled him a "voyeur". Mourinho was quoted as saying, "He's worried about us, he's always talking about us – it's [always] Chelsea". Wenger responded by pointing out he was only answering journalists' questions about Chelsea, and described Mourinho's attitude as "disrespectful". Mourinho later apologised and clarified that he regretted his "voyeur" comment; Wenger accepted the apology. In 2014, Mourinho reopened his feud with Wenger by calling him a "specialist in failure". This was in response to Wenger's comments that Chelsea were favourites for the Premier League and managers did not want to take responsibility if they failed to win the title. Wenger said Mourinho's comments were "silly and disrespectful" and had embarrassed Chelsea. When asked if he regretted his remark, Mourinho replied: "You have to ask him if he regrets the comments he made". In October 2014, during a Premier League match between Arsenal and Chelsea, Wenger was involved in a touchline spat with Mourinho. Wenger later apologised for his behaviour.

Wenger has directed his anger towards referees when decisions have not gone his team's way. In August 2000, he was charged with "alleged threatening behaviour and physical intimidation" towards fourth official Paul Taylor, after Arsenal's 1–0 defeat at Sunderland on the opening day of the 2000–01 season. An FA disciplinary commission found Wenger guilty; he received a 12-match touchline ban and a fine of four weeks' salary. He successfully appealed the ban, but was reprimanded and fined £10,000 for his actions. Following the 2007 Football League Cup Final, he called a linesman a liar, for stating Emmanuel Adebayor aimed a punch at Chelsea's Frank Lampard. This led to an investigation by the FA, a fine of £2,500 and a warning.

In March 2011, Wenger was charged with improper conduct by UEFA, over comments made to referee Massimo Busacca, after his team's defeat to Barcelona. He was fined €10,000 and suspended for one UEFA club competition match; however, the ban was later extended to a further two games, after Wenger was found guilty of communicating with Arsenal's bench while serving a touchline ban against Udinese. A year later, Wenger was charged for post-match comments made about referee Damir Skomina, in Arsenal's defeat to Milan in the Champions League. He was fined £33,000 and handed a three-match touchline ban in the competition.

== Plaudits and legacy ==
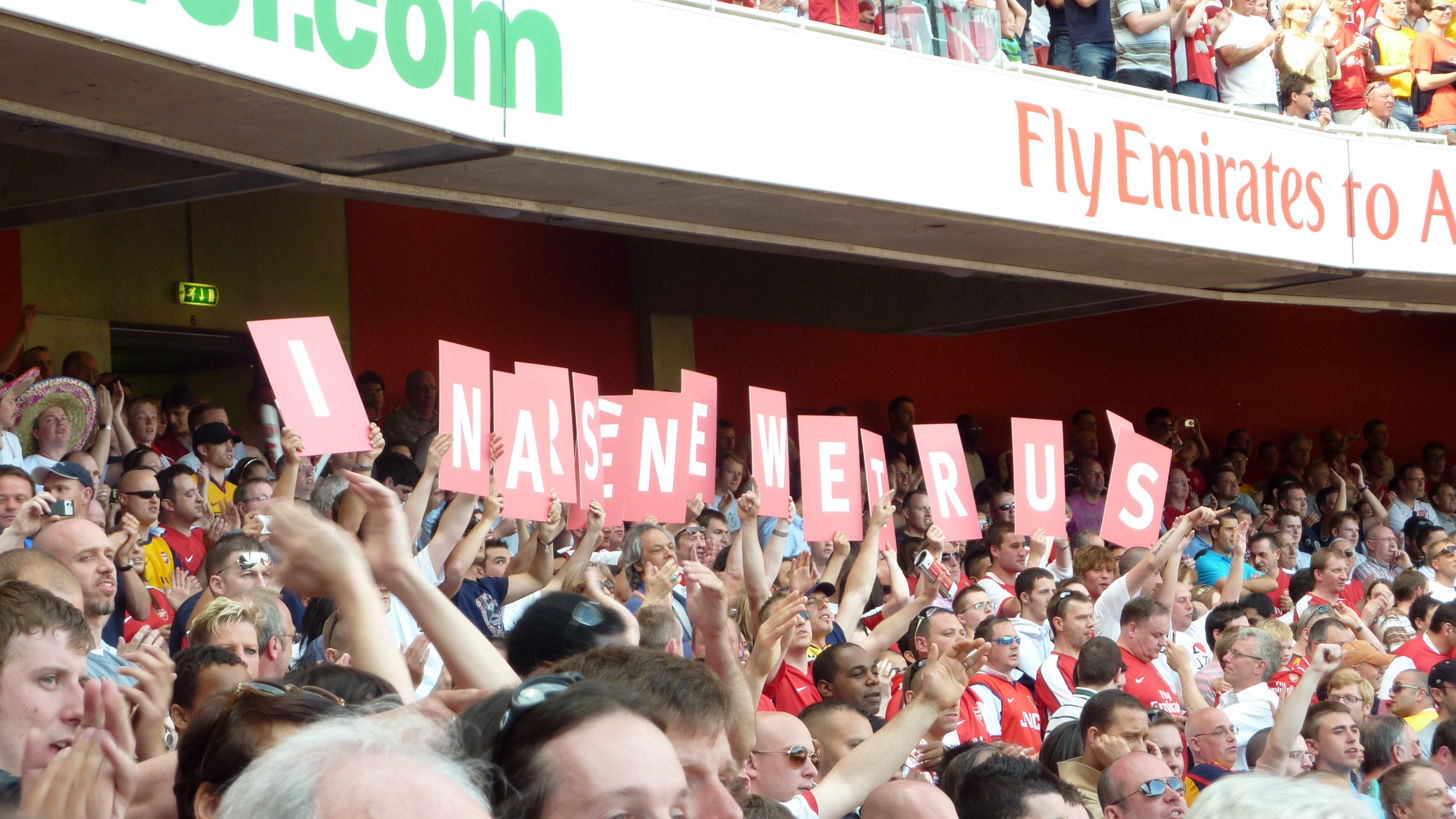
Arsenal supporters hold up cards that spell out "In Arsène we trust"

At Arsenal, Wenger has enjoyed a great deal of support and backing from the club board of directors, who demonstrated exceptional faith in the manager and his long-term vision. His arrival at the club prompted a change in their football style – once derided as "boring, boring Arsenal" for a lack of creativity, pundit Alan Hansen described the 2004 team as "quite simply the most fluid, devastating team the British Isles has seen". Brian Clough once quipped: "Arsenal caress a football the way I dreamed of caressing Marilyn Monroe". Wenger himself reflected that his greatest legacy at Arsenal would be the style he implemented. Supporters regularly display banners such as "Arsène knows" and "In Arsène we trust" during home matches, though there became a growing number of protests against his management.

External audio
- "Arsène Wenger – Profile"; First broadcast on BBC Radio 4 in August 2011

Dein described Wenger as the most important manager in the club's history: "Arsène's a miracle worker. He's revolutionised the club. He's turned players into world-class players. Since he has been here, we have seen football from another planet". Former Watford manager Graham Taylor said of Wenger in 2002: "I believe his biggest contribution to football is getting across the idea that players have to prepare right and look after themselves". Wenger's loyalty towards financial fair play and handling of Arsenal's debt since their stadium move has earnt him praise, not least from American baseball general manager Billy Beane, who in particular lauded his transfer strategy. A survey in 2007 found Wenger was the only Premier League manager to have made a profit on transfers, and between 2004 and 2009, he made an average profit of £4.4 million per season on transfers, far more than any other club.

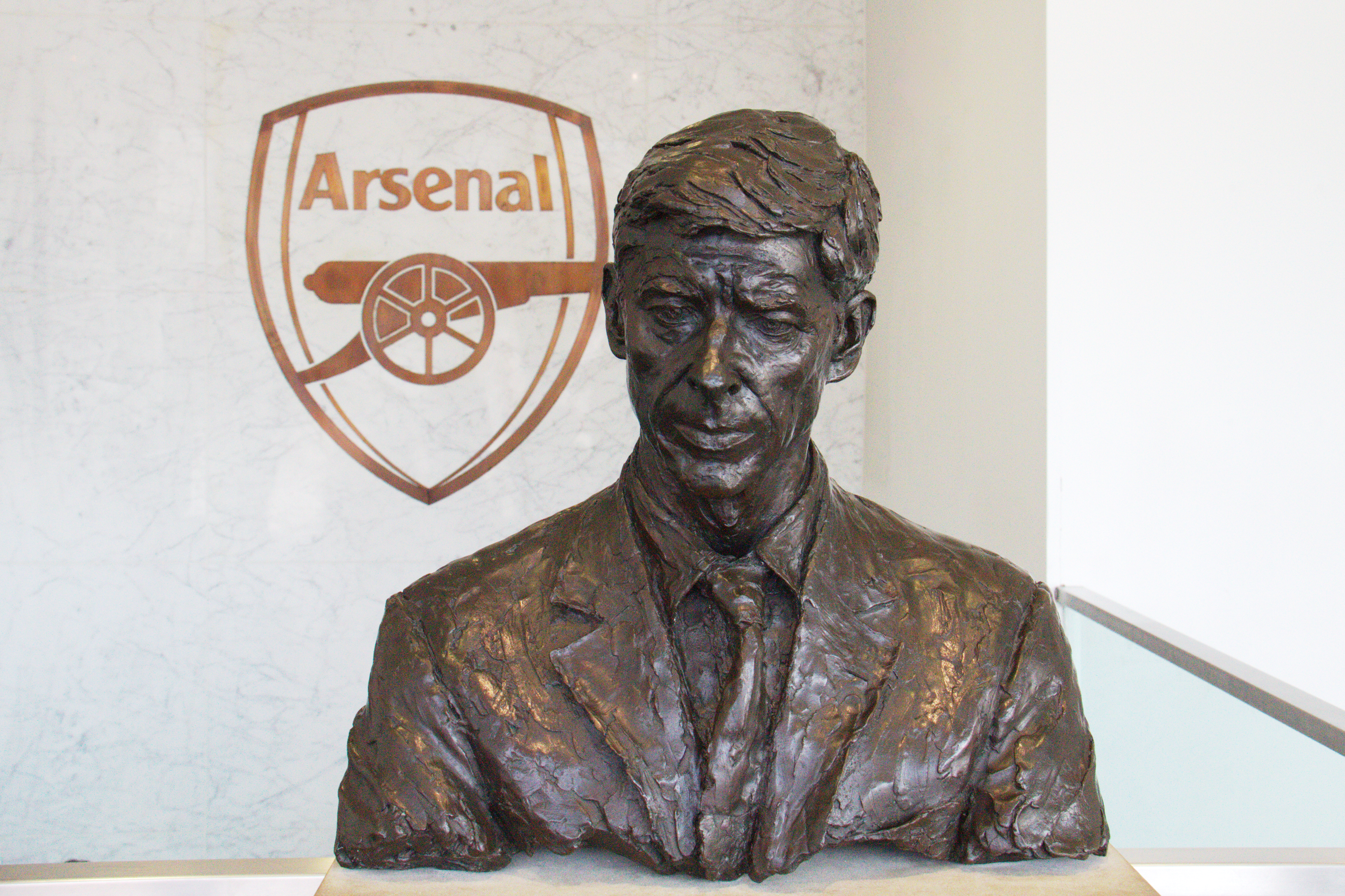
Bust of Wenger at the Emirates Stadium

Though Wenger established Arsenal as UEFA Champions League regulars, he never won a continental competition – he was a Champions League and UEFA Cup runner-up with Arsenal and a Cup Winners' Cup runner-up with Monaco – often considered a blemish on his managerial career. Writer Michael Calvin argues despite the European failings, Wenger should still be considered one of the greats in football: "[He] has been the best, most influential manager of the modern era. His job has involved managing change, and all the hypocrisy which comes with that. In a world where incoherence is routinely hailed as innovation, he has been a true visionary". Wenger's stubbornness to follow his idealistic vision of football was heavily criticised during his second decade at Arsenal. In 2016, Henry Winter reasoned the Frenchman's methods no longer gave him an advantage over others, and he needed to adapt or resign. Winter also suggested the club was content with lucrative top-four finishes, and the manager needed tough individuals to challenge him. Ferguson however expressed admiration in Wenger's consistency and obstinate nature: "He stays with what he believes in. And I think people who do that are outstanding coaches".

Wenger was awarded France's highest decoration, the Legion of Honour, in 2002. He was appointed an Honorary Officer of the Order of the British Empire (OBE) in the 2003 Birthday Honours for services to football. At Arsenal's valedictory campaign at Highbury throughout the 2005–06 season, supporters showed appreciation by holding a "Wenger Day" as one of various themed matchdays. It was held on his 56th birthday, on 22 October 2005, in a league match against Manchester City. Wenger was inducted into the English Football Hall of Fame in 2006, along with former England manager Ron Greenwood. Furthermore, a commissioned bronze bust of Wenger, similar to the earlier version of Herbert Chapman, was unveiled as a tribute to him by the board of directors of Arsenal, at the club's annual general meeting in October 2007. Wenger had an asteroid, 33179 Arsènewenger, named after him by astronomer Ian P. Griffin, who states Arsenal as his favourite football club.

In May 2016, the Stade Arsène Wenger was officially opened near Strasbourg, where Wenger was born. The stadium is the new home of USL Dippinheim and holds a capacity of 500 people. In July 2023, Arsenal unveiled an official statue of Wenger holding the "Invincible" Premier League trophy outside the Emirates Stadium, joining the likes of Dennis Bergkamp, Tony Adams, and Herbert Chapman to be commemorated in such a way outside the stadium.

=== Increase in worldwide players ===
Wenger was one of the first managers in English football to scout abroad for talent. His double-winning team of 1998 was described by editor Jason Cowley as "a model of racial and multicultural integration. They were the first truly globalised team". Richard Jolly writing for The National added that Wenger aided the Premier League's globalisation and "showed the merit of hiring foreign managers on the basis of their record abroad". Wenger himself felt he had changed attitudes towards foreign managers in England:

There was a history and belief in England that the foreign manager could not be successful. Now you have a different feeling, now you think only foreign managers can be successful. That is wrong as well. I believe I contributed to the change in attitude about foreign managers. That can look pretentious but I don't think it is at all. I can show some articles where people tried to prove that the foreign managers can never win an English championship. That has changed and I have certainly contributed to that. But I am also one of the few who also defends English managers.

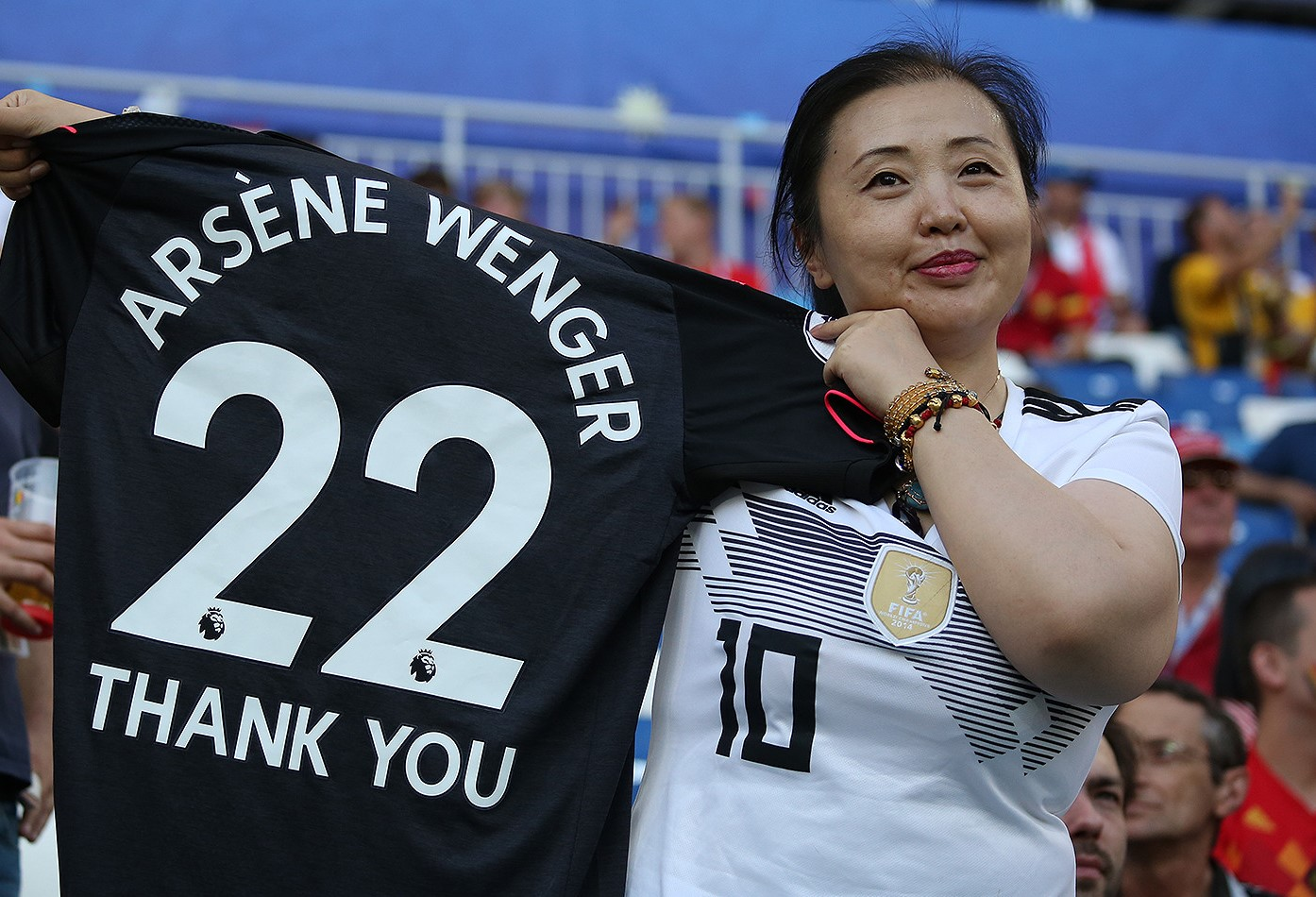
Fan holding an Arsenal shirt bearing the text "Arsène Wenger Thank You" at the match between Belgium and England at the 2018 FIFA World Cup

The continued influx of foreign players at Arsenal has, however, attracted criticism. In a league match against Crystal Palace on 14 February 2005, Arsenal fielded a 16-man squad that featured no British players for the first time in the club's history. This prompted Professional Footballers' Association (PFA) chief executive Gordon Taylor to express it would begin "a worrying pattern for English football". A year later, manager Alan Pardew commented that Arsenal's Champions League success was "not necessarily a triumph for British football". Wenger saw the issue of nationality as irrelevant and said, "When you represent a club, it's about values and qualities, not about passports". Other pundits including Trevor Brooking, the director of football development at the FA, have defended Wenger. Brooking has stated that a lack of English players in "one of England's most successful clubs" was more of a reflection on England's limited talent pool rather than on Wenger, an opinion shared by youth-team coach and former Liverpool player Craig Johnston.

Several English players have started their careers at Arsenal under Wenger, such as Ashley Cole, David Bentley and Matthew Upson, Wenger commented that an advantage of building his team around British players was the guarantee of stability.

=== Team indiscipline and fair play ===
In his early years at Arsenal, Wenger was scrutinised for the club's poor disciplinary record; Winter in 2003 described it as "little short of a crime-wave", while chairman Peter Hill-Wood admitted the players' conduct was unacceptable. Between September 1996 and February 2014, the team received 100 red cards. Wenger has often tried to defend his players, involved in controversial incidents on the field, by saying that he has not seen the incident; this is an option he resorts to when there is no "rational explanation" to defend him, and that he has the player's best interests in mind. However, in both 2004 and 2005, Arsenal topped the Premier League's Fair Play League tables for sporting behaviour and finished second in 2006. Their record as one of the most sporting clubs in the division continued up to 2009, where the team featured in the top four of the Fair Play table. Wenger's team again topped the fair play table for the 2009–10 season.

In February 1999, Wenger offered Sheffield United a replay of their FA Cup fifth round match immediately after the match had finished, due to the controversial circumstances in which it was won. The decisive goal was scored by Overmars after Kanu failed to return the ball to the opposition; it was kicked into touch to allow Sheffield United's Lee Morris to receive treatment for an injury. Arsenal went on to win the replayed match 2–1.

== Personal life ==
Wenger was married to former basketball player Annie Brosterhous, with whom he has one daughter, Léa (born 1997). In 2010, Wenger appealed for privacy after a British newspaper alleged he had an affair with a French singer. Wenger said in a statement that he wished to deal with the matter privately. Wenger and Brosterhous legally separated in 2015.

As of 1999, Wenger spent his leisure time predominantly studying football matches; he once stated that he "watches games on most days", and holds an interest in politics.

As of 2014, Wenger resided in Totteridge, London.

Wenger acted as a football consultant for French television station TF1 from 2004 to 2014, and has worked for beIN Sports since 2016. Wenger was a world brand ambassador for FIFA World Cup sponsor Castrol. As part of the arrangement, he conducted several training camps for international youth teams worldwide to provide input to the Castrol Performance Index, FIFA's official ratings system.

He has authored a book on football management exclusively for the Japanese market, Shōsha no Esupuri (勝者のエスプリ, lit. The Spirit of Conquest) in English, published by Japan Broadcast Publishing (a subsidiary of NHK) in August 1997. The book highlights his managerial philosophy, ideals, and values, as well as his thoughts on Japanese football and the game as a whole.

Wenger is a Roman Catholic, and he attributes his outlook and values to his religious upbringing in Alsace. He grew up speaking French and German, and studied English on a three-week course in Cambridge, learning Italian, and Spanish to help his career. He also has a working knowledge of Japanese.

On 13 October 2020, Wenger's second book, My Life in Red & White: My Autobiography, was published by W&N, translated from French.

== Career statistics ==
=== Playing statistics ===
Appearances and goals by club, season and competition
Club	Season	League			National Cup		Europe		Total	
Club	Season	Division	Apps	Goals	Apps	Goals	Apps	Goals	Apps	Goals
Mutzig	1969–70	CFA					—			
Mutzig	1970–71	CFA					—			
Mutzig	1971–72	Division 3					—			
Mutzig	1972–73	Division 3			3	1	—		3	1
Mutzig	Total				3	1	—		3	1
Mulhouse	1973–74	Division 2	25	2			—		25	2
Mulhouse	1974–75	Division 2	31	2			—		31	2
Mulhouse	Total		56	4			—		56	4
ASPV Strasbourg	1975–76	Promotion d'Honneur			3	1	—		3	1
ASPV Strasbourg	1976–77	Division d'Honneur			5	0	—		5	0
ASPV Strasbourg	1977–78	Division 3					—			
ASPV Strasbourg	Total				8	1	—		8	1
RC Strasbourg	1978–79	Division 1	2	0			1 (Note: Appearance in UEFA Cup)	0	3	0
RC Strasbourg	1979–80	Division 1	1	0					1	0
RC Strasbourg	1980–81	Division 1	8	0	1	0	—		9	0
RC Strasbourg	Total		11	0	1	0	1	0	13	0
Career total			67	4	12	2	1	0	80	6

=== Managerial statistics ===
As of 13 May 2018

Managerial record by team and tenure
Team	From	To	Record				
Team	From	To	P	W	D (Note: At the time of Wenger's tenure in Japan, the result of a J-League match could not be a draw. In the event of scores being level at the end of 90 minutes, matches would be decided by extra time and penalties.)	L	Win %
Nancy	1 July 1984	1 July 1987	114	33	30	51	28.9
Monaco	1 July 1987	17 September 1994	349	169	105	75	48.4
Nagoya Grampus Eight	1 February 1995	30 September 1996	87	49	4	34	56.3
Arsenal	1 October 1996	13 May 2018	1,235	707	280	248	57.2
Total			1,785	958	419	408	53.7

== Honours ==
=== Player ===
Mutzig

- Coupe d'Alsace: 1971

Vauban

- Coupe d'Alsace: 1977
- Division d'Honneur Alsace: 1977

RC Strasbourg

- Division 1: 1978–79
- Coupe d'Alsace: 1980

=== Manager ===
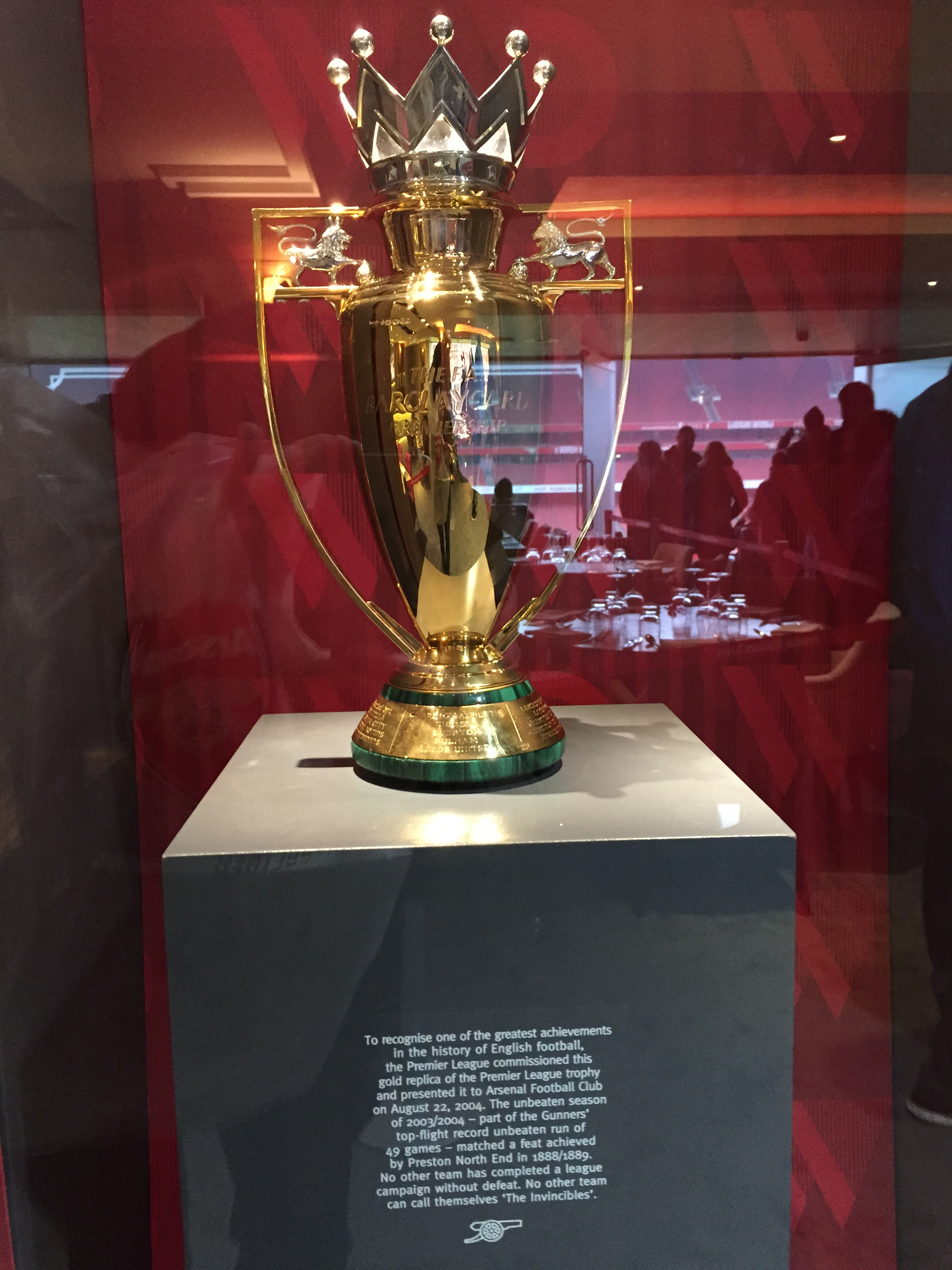
The Premier League commissioned a unique gold trophy to commemorate Arsenal's achievement of winning the 2003–04 league unbeaten. Wenger was given the trophy as a parting gift from the club after his last home game as manager on 6 May 2018.

Monaco

- Division 1: 1987–88
- Coupe de France: 1990–91
- European Cup Winners' Cup runner-up: 1991–92

Nagoya Grampus

- Emperor's Cup: 1995
- Japanese Super Cup: 1996

Arsenal

- Premier League: 1997–98, 2001–02, 2003–04
- FA Cup: 1997–98, 2001–02, 2002–03, 2004–05, 2013–14, 2014–15, 2016–17; runner-up: 2000–01
- FA Charity/Community Shield: 1998, 1999, 2002, 2004, 2014, 2015 2017
- Football League/EFL Cup runner-up: 2006–07, 2010–11, 2017–18
- UEFA Champions League runner-up: 2005–06
- UEFA Cup runner-up: 1999–2000

Individual

- J. League Manager of the Year: 1995
- Onze d'Or Coach of The Year: 2000, 2002, 2003, 2004
- Premier League Manager of the Season: 1997–98, 2001–02, 2003–04
- LMA Manager of the Year: 2001–02, 2003–04
- BBC Sports Personality of the Year Coach Award: 2002, 2004
- London Football Awards – Outstanding Contribution to a London Club: 2015
- World Soccer Manager of the Year: 1998
- FWA Tribute Award: 2005
- English Football Hall of Fame: 2006
- France Football Manager of the Year: 2008
- IFFHS World Coach of the Decade: 2001–2010
- Facebook FA Premier League Manager of the Year: 2014–15
- Premier League Manager of the Month: March 1998, April 1998, October 2000, April 2002, September 2002, August 2003, February 2004, August 2004, September 2007, December 2007, February 2011, February 2012, September 2013, March 2015, October 2015
- France Football 32nd Greatest Manager of All Time: 2019
- World Soccer 36th Greatest Manager of All Time: 2013
- Laureus Lifetime Achievement Award: 2019
- Premier League Hall of Fame: 2023

Orders

- Knight of the Legion of Honour: 2002
- Honorary Officer of the Order of the British Empire: 2003
- Freedom of Islington: 2004
- Knight Grand Commander of the Humane Order of African Redemption: 2018
- Officer of the Legion of Honour: 2019

== See also ==
- List of longest managerial reigns in association football
- List of English football championship winning managers
- List of football managers with the most matches
- List of FA Cup winning managers
- List of Arsenal F.C. managers
