= Playermaker =

Sports technology company

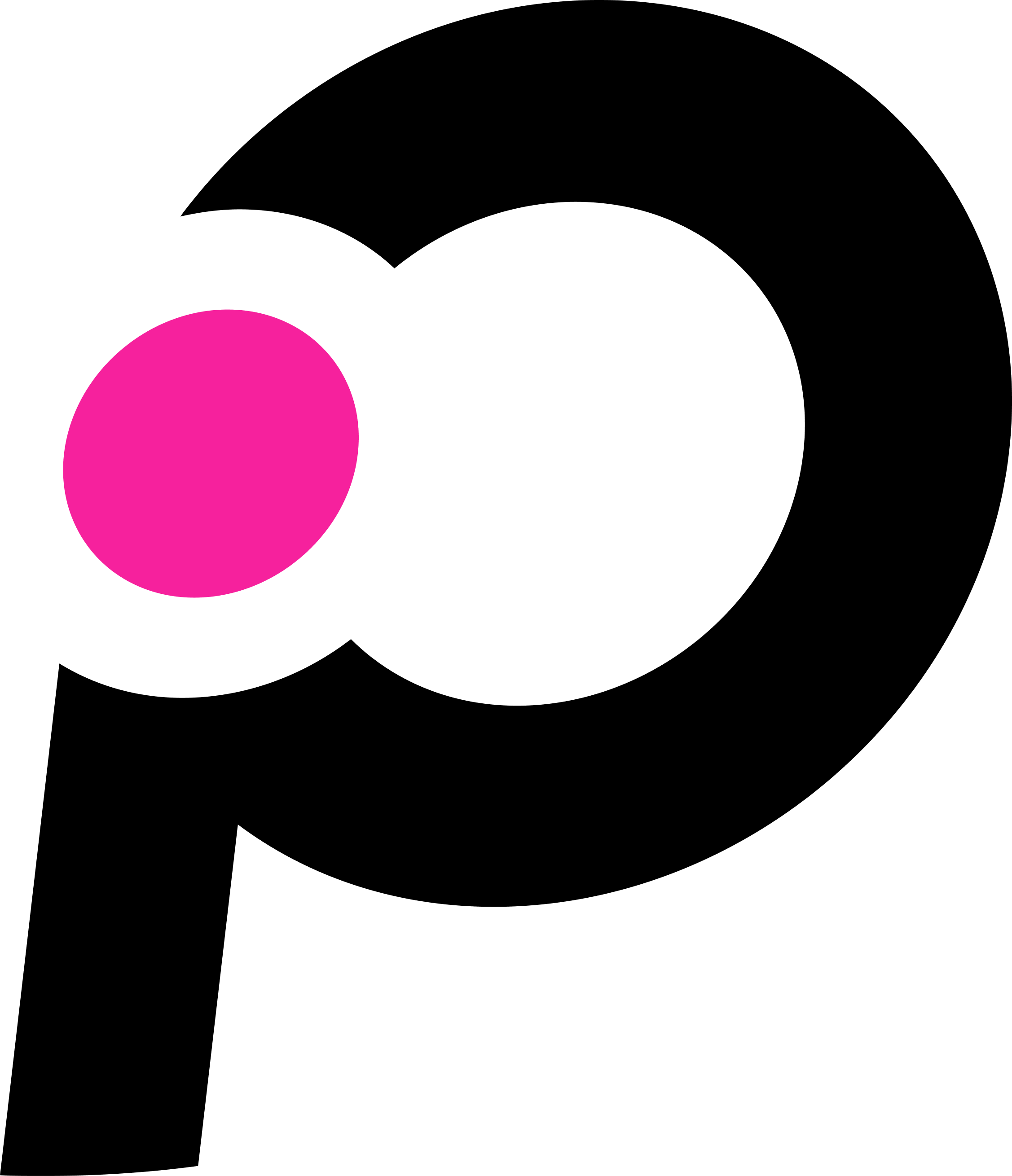
- Formerly: Motionize
- Company type: Private
- Industry: Sports tech
- Founded: 2017
- Founders: Guy Aharon & Yuval Odem
- Headquarters: Tel Aviv, Israel
- Website: www.playermaker.com

Playermaker is a sports technology company.

== History ==
Playermaker was founded in 2017 in Israel by Guy Aharon and Yuval Odem, who formerly served in the Israeli Defense Forces. The company was formerly known as Motionize and it began by developing a device for advanced tracking of human motion back in 2014.

=== Funding ===
By 2023, Playermaker raised total of $45M in funding, with powerhouse investors like ADvantage, Ryan Sports Venture and Ventura Capital Group, with additional investment by MIG Capital, and others.

Earlier in 2019, former Arsenal manager, Arsène Wenger invested in Playermaker.

=== Partnerships ===
In November 2022, Playermaker and Manchester City collaborated to launch CityPlay, a co-branded sports product that offers analysis for players, while also offering educational and training content from Manchester City.

Playermaker has established partnerships with Elite Soccer Academy and several sports clubs that use its technology. Notable clubs include: Fulham, Rangers and many others. The company has also established partnerships with the United States Soccer Federation and the Scottish Football Association.

In 2022, Liverpool winger, Harvey Elliott became a brand ambassador for the company.

== Products ==
Playermaker offers sports technology products that are designed to provide data to players, coaches, and teams.

Playermaker's technology includes sensors that are attached to a player's shoes which collect data on various aspects of their performance. The data collected by Playermaker's technology can be used for performance analysis, injury prevention, and improving overall player development.

== FIFA Certification ==
In September 2023, Playermaker was awarded the FIFA certification to be allowed in official match play as a wearable Tracking System. Earlier in 2021, Playermaker was placed on the FIFA Innovation Programme. Playermaker completed the challenge set by the FIFA Innovation Program and earned the Electronic Performance Tracking Systems (EPTS) FIFA quality certificate.
