= Duttlenheim =

Duttlenheim Dìttle (Alsatian)
- Commune
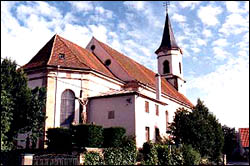
- The church in Duttlenheim

- Coat of arms
- Location of Duttlenheim
- Location within France Location within Grand Est
- Coordinates: 48°31′32″N 7°33′59″E
- Country: France
- Region: Grand Est
- Department: Bas-Rhin
- Arrondissement: Molsheim
- Canton: Molsheim

Government
  - Mayor (2021–2026): Alexandre Denisty
- Area^{1}: 8.6 km^{2} (3.3 sq mi)
- Highest elevation: 178 m (584 ft)
- Lowest elevation: 157 m (515 ft)
- Population (2023): 3,011
  - Density: 350/km^{2} (910/sq mi)
- Time zone: UTC+01:00 (CET)
  - Summer (DST): UTC+02:00 (CEST)
- INSEE/Postal code: 67112 /67120
- ^{1} French Land Register data, which excludes lakes, ponds, glaciers > 1 km^{2} (0.386 sq mi or 247 acres) and river estuaries.

Duttlenheim (French pronunciation: [dytlənajm]; German: Düttelnheim; Alsatian: Dìttle) is a commune in the Bas-Rhin department in Grand Est in north-eastern France. It is located about 20 kilometres (12 mi) southwest of Strasbourg, and approximately 20 km from the German border.

Arsène Wenger, former long-time manager of Arsenal F.C., grew up here. His parents ran the bistro La croix d'or, where he would spend hours studying the behaviour of the football-loving customers.

== Population ==
Historical population
Year	Pop.	±% p.a.
1968	1,502	—
1975	1,740	+2.12%
1982	2,036	+2.27%
1990	2,291	+1.49%
1999	2,395	+0.49%
2007	2,818	+2.05%
2012	2,807	−0.08%
2017	2,890	+0.58%
2023	3,011	+0.69%
Source: INSEE

== See also ==
- Communes of the Bas-Rhin department
