= Gambling in Vietnam =

Gambling in Vietnam is illegal and has been for centuries. A late 1940s travelogue notes that merchants kept bowls of dice at their stalls to engage in gambling with their customers when “housewives would routinely bet on the days their horoscope was fortunate", which means that on slightly more than fifty percent of such occasions they return home empty-handed and with the housekeeping money gone."

== Crackdown ==
Until the late 20th Century, the only legal gambling option was the lottery.

In an effort to combat illegal gambling, the government slowly began to legalize gambling, while cracking down on major illegal gambling rings. In March 2018, the government shut down a $420 million gambling ring that implicated two senior government officials and some 90 others (including government officials). In September 2018, leader of an illegal online sports betting ring was sentenced to nine years in jail; the operation was worth some US $26 million. A separate online gambling ring shut down in 2017 was thought to be worth US $89 million. Xinhua reported a rash of pawn shops popping up during the 2018 World Cup, whose only purpose was to serve local gamblers. The black market gambling sector is estimated to be worth billions of dollars.

== Legalization ==
The country legalized local games of chance in 2017. The country has eight casinos open for foreign passport holders, with investors seeking to open up the larger domestic customer base. As part of a three year experiment, locals are permitted to enter casinos if they can show monthly income exceeding 10 million dong (US$449) and are charged a 1 million dong entry tax. The country announced plans in 2017 to legalize sports betting.

On June 14, 2018, the National Assembly passed a bill legalizing sports betting, with government oversight. This followed a 2017 decree that legalized betting on international football games, horse races and greyhound racing. Players must be at least 21 years of age, with the minimum bet set at 1000 dong and a maximum of one million dong per day. Players wishing to enter a casino must also be at least 21 years old, have the permission from their family to do so and not have a criminal record.

== Casinos ==
The largest hotel-casino in Vietnam as of 2017 was The Grand Ho Tram Strip in Hồ Tràm. It is controlled by Philip Falcone and opened in 2013. The US$1 billion building has a 550 room hotel, a Greg Norman-designed golf course and second hotel tower under construction as of 2017. Foreign investors are required to invest over $2 billion to qualify for casino licenses.

In 2018, construction began along a three-kilometer (2-mile) stretch of coastline in central Vietnam where the country’s biggest casino is set to open. Suncity Group Holdings Ltd of Macau invested $4 billion in the Hoiana project that covers almost 1,000 hectares (2,500 acres) and includes shops, restaurants, golf courses and water parks. The casino will be owned by SunCity. VinaCapital, a Vietnamese investment management and real estate firm, and the Hong Kong–based VMS Investment Group will also hold similar ownership stakes in the project.

Two other casinos were under construction in 2018, one in Van Don in the northern province of Quang Ninh, and one on Phu Quoc island. These are part of the pilot project to allow locals to enter casinos. The Van Don is scheduled to open in 2019 and will be managed by SunCity. The Phu Quoc Corona Casino opened in 2019.

In 2024, NET88 became the sponsor of Premier League club Crystal Palace for a two-year deal, replacing previous sponsor Cinch.

== See also ==
- Xóc Đĩa
