= 2025–26 Premier League =

Football season in England

Premier League
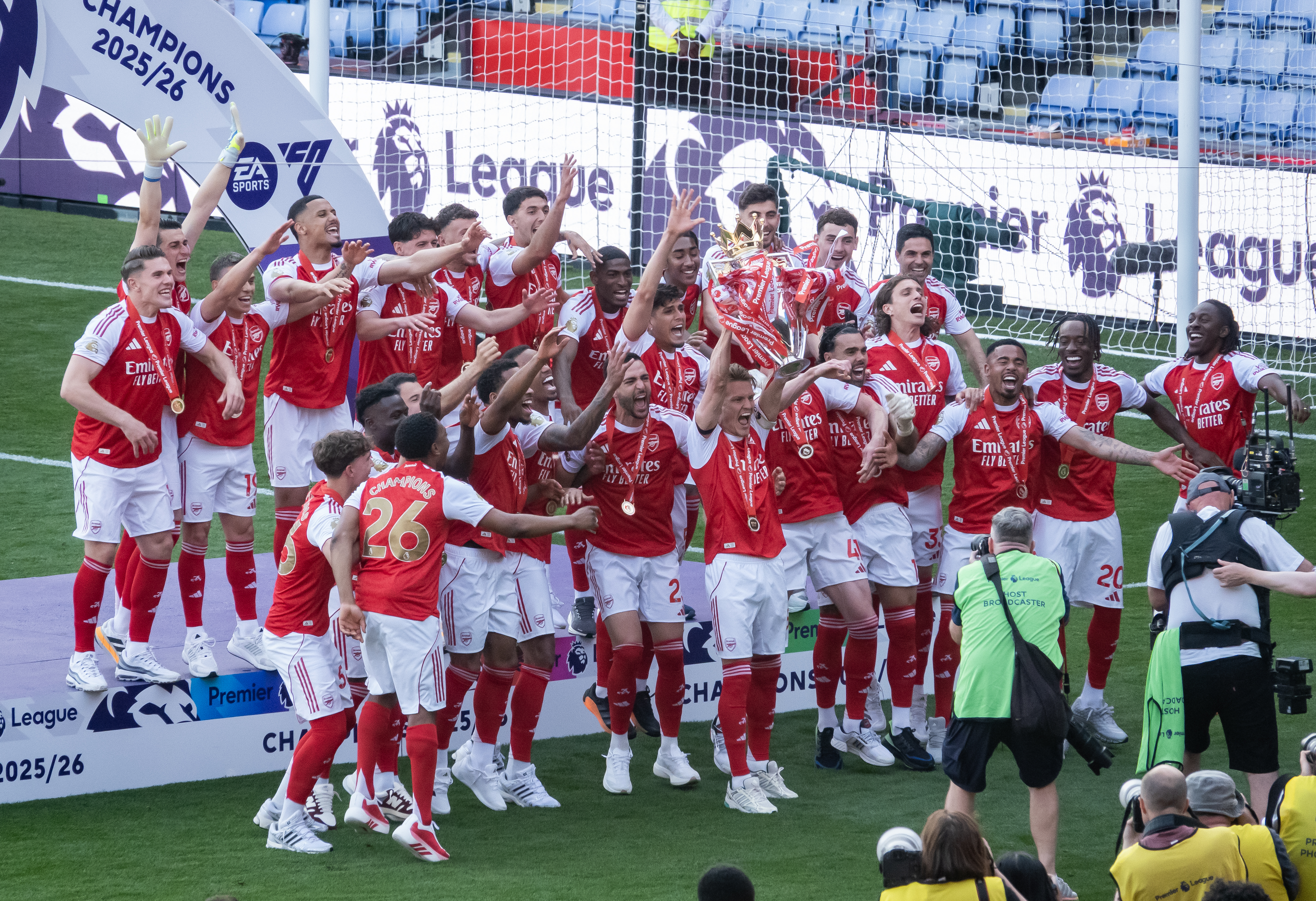
- Arsenal being crowned champions on 24 May 2026 for the first time in 22 years
- Season: 2025–26
- Dates: 15 August 2025 – 24 May 2026
- Champions: Arsenal; 4th Premier League title 14th English title
- Relegated: West Ham United; Burnley; Wolverhampton Wanderers
- Champions League: Arsenal; Manchester City; Manchester United; Aston Villa; Liverpool
- Europa League: Bournemouth; Sunderland; Crystal Palace (as Conference League winners)
- Conference League: Brighton & Hove Albion
- Matches: 380
- Goals: 1,045 (2.75 per match)
- Best player: Bruno Fernandes
- Top goalscorer: Erling Haaland (27 goals)
- Best goalkeeper: David Raya (19 clean sheets)
- Biggest home win: Arsenal 5–0; Leeds United (23 August 2025)
- Biggest away win: Sunderland 0–5; Nottingham Forest (24 April 2026)
- Highest scoring: Fulham 4–5; Manchester City (2 December 2025)
- Longest winning run: 8 matches Aston Villa
- Longest unbeaten run: 18 matches Bournemouth
- Longest winless run: 19 matches Wolverhampton Wanderers
- Longest losing run: 11 matches Wolverhampton Wanderers
- Highest attendance: 74,257; Manchester United 3–2 Burnley (30 August 2025)
- Lowest attendance: 10,762; Bournemouth 1–1 Burnley (20 December 2025)
- Total attendance: 15,820,861
- Average attendance: 41,634

The 2025–26 Premier League was the 34th season of the Premier League and the 127th season of top-flight English football. The fixtures were released on 18 June 2025. The season consisted of 33 weekend and five midweek rounds of matches.

Liverpool were the defending champions, but were unable to defend their title, with Arsenal winning their fourth Premier League title and 14th English title with one match to spare, ending their 22-year Premier League drought since they last won in 2004, following Manchester City's 1–1 draw away against Bournemouth on 19 May 2026, combined with their 1–0 win at home against Burnley the previous day.

This was the first season to feature the Tyne–Wear derby in the Premier League since the 2015–16 season, following Sunderland's promotion via the Championship play-offs.

The summer transfer window opened on 16 June 2025 and closed at 19:00 BST on 1 September 2025. The winter window opened on 1 January 2026 and closed at 19:00 GMT on 2 February 2026.

== Summary ==
=== Title race ===
The early pace-setters were Liverpool, who won their first five games and spent nearly all of August and September combined on top of the Premier League table. However, Arsenal went top of the table on 4 October after a 2–0 win over West Ham United was followed on the same day by a 2–1 defeat for Liverpool against Chelsea; they would remain virtually top for the rest of the season, leading the table for a total of 238 days. Their lead from Manchester City fluctuated and at one point on 22 April, City were ahead of Arsenal on goals scored. However, Arsenal won their next four games and with City's draws at Everton on 4 May and Bournemouth on 19 May, they were confirmed champions with a game to spare.

On 24 May, Arsenal were crowned champions after being presented with the Premier League trophy after a 2–1 away win against Crystal Palace on the final day of the season.

=== European places ===
Nine clubs will play in European competitions next season. The Premier League will have their usual four UEFA Champions League places plus a fifth place due to the European Performance Spot (EPS), awarded to the two best performing associations from the previous season; Arsenal, Manchester City, Manchester United and Aston Villa all confirmed their places with games to spare, and the fifth place went to Liverpool on the last day of the season. Since the FA Cup and EFL Cup winners Manchester City qualified for the Champions League and with the sixth place team qualifying for the UEFA Europa League through the league route, their Europa League place went to the seventh place team and their UEFA Conference League place was given to the eighth place team. Aston Villa won the Europa League final on 20 May, but as they finished fourth on the final day, instead of a sixth place in the Champions League being awarded to the Premier League, the access list was rebalanced and Sporting Lisbon were given the spot in the league phase instead. Sixth-placed Bournemouth alongside seventh-placed Sunderland qualified for the Europa League while Brighton finished eighth and qualified for the UEFA Conference League play-off round. Crystal Palace also gained a Europa League place as the winners of the Conference League final against Rayo Vallecano on 27 May.

=== Relegation ===
Wolverhampton Wanderers became the first team to be relegated to the EFL Championship on 20 April 2026, after a goalless draw between West Ham United and Crystal Palace combined with their 3–0 loss away to Leeds United two days previously. This ended an eight-year stay in the Premier League, and also meant that this would be the first time since the 2022–23 season where at least one promoted club avoided immediate relegation, after all three of the promoted teams went straight back down in 2023–24 and 2024–25.

Burnley became the second team to be relegated to the EFL Championship on 22 April 2026 following their 1–0 loss at home to Manchester City.

The last relegation spot was decided on the final day of the season between London rivals West Ham United and Tottenham Hotspur, with Spurs having a two point advantage. West Ham defeated Leeds United 3–0 in their last match, but due to Tottenham also beating Everton, West Ham became the third team to be relegated. This was the first season since 2010–11 that a club was relegated with as many as 39 points.

=== Promoted clubs ===
Following a 1–1 draw against already relegated Wolverhampton Wanderers on 2 May, Sunderland became mathematically safe from relegation. Leeds United's safety was secured following a 1–0 win for Arsenal against West Ham United on 10 May. Sunderland and Leeds were the first promoted clubs to avoid relegation since the 2022–23 season. Sunderland finished the season in seventh, a joint best for a newly promoted side alongside Wolverhampton Wanderers in the 2018–19 season, and with 54 points, the most since Leeds United's 59 in the 2020–21 season. This is also the third time Sunderland finished the season in seventh with over 50 points, following the 1999–2000 season and the 2000–01 season finishing with 58 and 57 points respectively.

=== Developments ===
This was the first full season with semi-automated offside technology in use, following its introduction during the previous season on 12 April 2025.

Puma also replaced Nike as the official match ball supplier, ending a 25-year partnership between the Premier League and Nike, from the 2000–01 season to the 2024–25 season. Ref-cam technology also appeared in selected matches during its opening round with a view to making the new technology a permanent feature of live TV games for the rest of the season.

== Teams ==
Twenty teams competed in the league – the top seventeen teams from the previous season and three promoted from the Championship. The promoted teams were Leeds United, Burnley, and Sunderland, returning to the top flight after absences of two, one, and eight years, respectively. They replaced Leicester City, Ipswich Town, and Southampton, who were all relegated to the Championship after one year in the top flight. This marked the second consecutive season, and only the third time in Premier League history, in which all three promoted teams were relegated after just one season.

=== Stadiums and locations ===
Locations of the 2025–26 Premier League teams
Greater London Premier League football clubs

Note: Table lists in alphabetical order. Data source:

Team	Location	Stadium	Capacity
Arsenal	London (Holloway)	Emirates Stadium	60,704
Aston Villa	Birmingham	Villa Park	43,205
Bournemouth	Bournemouth	Dean Court	11,307
Brentford	London (Brentford)	Brentford Community Stadium	17,250
Brighton & Hove Albion	Falmer	Falmer Stadium	31,876
Burnley	Burnley	Turf Moor	21,990
Chelsea	London (Fulham)	Stamford Bridge	40,044
Crystal Palace	London (Selhurst)	Selhurst Park	25,194
Everton	Liverpool (Vauxhall)	Hill Dickinson Stadium	52,769
Fulham	London (Fulham)	Craven Cottage	28,800
Leeds United	Leeds	Elland Road	37,645
Liverpool	Liverpool (Anfield)	Anfield	61,276
Manchester City	Manchester (Bradford)	City of Manchester Stadium	52,900
Manchester United	Manchester (Old Trafford)	Old Trafford	74,244
Newcastle United	Newcastle upon Tyne	St James' Park	52,264
Nottingham Forest	West Bridgford	City Ground	31,042
Sunderland	Sunderland	Stadium of Light	48,707
Tottenham Hotspur	London (Tottenham)	Tottenham Hotspur Stadium	62,850
West Ham United	London (Stratford)	London Stadium	62,500
Wolverhampton Wanderers	Wolverhampton	Molineux Stadium	31,750

For the 2025–26 season, the combined stadium capacity of the 20 Premier League clubs was 846,049, with an average of 42,302. This was the first season Everton played at their new stadium, the Hill Dickinson Stadium, following their move from Goodison Park.

=== Personnel and kits ===
Team	Manager	Captain	Kit manufacturer	Shirt sponsor (chest)	Shirt sponsor (sleeve)
Arsenal	(Spain) Mikel Arteta	(Norway) Martin Ødegaard	(Germany) Adidas	(United Arab Emirates) Emirates	Visit Rwanda
Aston Villa	(Spain) Unai Emery	(Scotland) John McGinn	(Germany) Adidas	(Greece) Betano	(United Kingdom) Trade Nation
Bournemouth	(Spain) Andoni Iraola	(England) Adam Smith	(United Kingdom) Umbro	(Philippines) bj88	(United Kingdom) LEOS International
Brentford	(Republic of Ireland) Keith Andrews	(Republic of Ireland) Nathan Collins	(Spain) Joma	(South Africa) Hollywoodbets	(United Kingdom) Cazoo
Brighton & Hove Albion	(Germany) Fabian Hürzeler	(England) Lewis Dunk	(United States) Nike	(United States) American Express	(United States) Experience Kissimmee
Burnley	(England) Mike Jackson (interim)	(Republic of Ireland) Josh Cullen	(United Kingdom) Castore	(Comoros) 96.com	(Australia) Sure
Chelsea	(England) Calum McFarlane (interim)	(England) Reece James	(United States) Nike	(Sweden) IFS^{1}	(Vietnam) FPT
Crystal Palace	(Austria) Oliver Glasner	(England) Dean Henderson	(Italy) Macron	(Vietnam) NET88	(Philippines) Kaiyun Sports
Everton	(Scotland) David Moyes	(Republic of Ireland) Séamus Coleman	(United Kingdom) Castore	(Australia) (Curaçao) Stake.com	(United Kingdom) Christopher Ward
Fulham	(Portugal) Marco Silva	(Scotland) Tom Cairney	(Germany) Adidas	(Philippines) SBOTOP	(United Kingdom) HiBob
Leeds United	(Germany) Daniel Farke	(Wales) Ethan Ampadu	(Germany) Adidas	(Austria) Red Bull	(Cyprus) Parimatch
Liverpool	(Netherlands) Arne Slot	(Netherlands) Virgil van Dijk	(Germany) Adidas	(United Kingdom) Standard Chartered	(United States) Expedia
Manchester City	(Spain) Pep Guardiola	(Portugal) Bernardo Silva	(Germany) Puma	(United Arab Emirates) Etihad Airways	(United States) OKX
Manchester United	(England) Michael Carrick	(Portugal) Bruno Fernandes	(Germany) Adidas	(United States) Qualcomm Snapdragon	(United States) DXC Technology
Newcastle United	(England) Eddie Howe	(Brazil) Bruno Guimarães	(Germany) Adidas	(Saudi Arabia) Sela	(United Arab Emirates) Noon
Nottingham Forest	(Portugal) Vítor Pereira	(England) Ryan Yates	(Germany) Adidas	(United States) Bally's	(United Kingdom) Ideagen
Sunderland	(France) Régis Le Bris	(Switzerland) Granit Xhaka	(Denmark) Hummel	(Philippines) W88	(United Kingdom) LiveScore Bet
Tottenham Hotspur	(Italy) Roberto De Zerbi	(Argentina) Cristian Romero	(United States) Nike	(Hong Kong) AIA	(United States) Kraken
West Ham United	(Portugal) Nuno Espírito Santo	(England) Jarrod Bowen	(United Kingdom) Umbro	(Republic of Ireland) BoyleSports	(United States) QuickBooks
Wolverhampton Wanderers	(Wales) Rob Edwards	(Portugal) Toti Gomes	(United Kingdom) Sudu	(Vietnam) DEBET	(United Kingdom) JD Sports

1. Chelsea ran sponsorless until 20 February 2026.

=== Managerial changes ===
Team	Outgoing manager	Manner of departure	Date of vacancy	Position in the table	Incoming manager	Date of appointment
Tottenham Hotspur	(Australia) Ange Postecoglou	Sacked	6 June 2025	Pre-season	(Denmark) Thomas Frank	12 June 2025
Brentford	(Denmark) Thomas Frank	Signed by Tottenham Hotspur	12 June 2025	Pre-season	(Republic of Ireland) Keith Andrews	27 June 2025
Nottingham Forest	(Portugal) Nuno Espírito Santo	Sacked	8 September 2025	10th	(Australia) Ange Postecoglou	9 September 2025
West Ham United	(England) Graham Potter	Sacked	27 September 2025	19th	(Portugal) Nuno Espírito Santo	27 September 2025
Nottingham Forest	(Australia) Ange Postecoglou	Sacked	18 October 2025	18th	(England) Sean Dyche	21 October 2025
Wolverhampton Wanderers	(Portugal) Vítor Pereira	Sacked	2 November 2025	20th	(Wales) Rob Edwards	12 November 2025
Chelsea	(Italy) Enzo Maresca	Resigned	1 January 2026	5th	(England) Liam Rosenior	8 January 2026
Manchester United	(Portugal) Ruben Amorim	Sacked	5 January 2026	6th	(England) Michael Carrick	13 January 2026
Tottenham Hotspur	(Denmark) Thomas Frank	Sacked	11 February 2026	16th	(Croatia) Igor Tudor	14 February 2026
Nottingham Forest	(England) Sean Dyche	Sacked	12 February 2026	17th	(Portugal) Vítor Pereira	15 February 2026
Tottenham Hotspur	(Croatia) Igor Tudor	Mutual consent	29 March 2026	17th	(Italy) Roberto De Zerbi	31 March 2026
Chelsea	(England) Liam Rosenior	Sacked	22 April 2026	7th	(England) Calum McFarlane (interim)	22 April 2026
Burnley	(England) Scott Parker	Mutual consent	30 April 2026	19th	(England) Mike Jackson (interim)	30 April 2026

== League table ==
Pos	Team	Pld	W	D	L	GF	GA	GD	Pts	Qualification or relegation
1	Arsenal (C)	38	26	7	5	71	27	+44	85	Qualification for the Champions League league phase (Note: The Premier League gained an additional Champions League place as a result of England gaining one of the two European Performance Spots (EPS) awarded to the two associations with the highest UEFA coefficient points in 2025–26.)
2	Manchester City	38	23	9	6	77	35	+42	78	Qualification for the Champions League league phase
3	Manchester United	38	20	11	7	69	50	+19	71	Qualification for the Champions League league phase
4	Aston Villa	38	19	8	11	56	49	+7	65	Qualification for the Champions League league phase
5	Liverpool	38	17	9	12	63	53	+10	60	Qualification for the Champions League league phase
6	Bournemouth	38	13	18	7	58	54	+4	57	Qualification for the Europa League league phase (Note: Since the winners of the 2025–26 FA Cup and 2025–26 EFL Cup, Manchester City, qualified for the Champions League by league position, the spot reserved for the FA Cup winners (Europa League league phase) was passed to the seventh-placed team, and the spot reserved for the EFL Cup winners (Conference League play-off round) was passed to the eighth-placed team.)
7	Sunderland	38	14	12	12	42	48	−6	54	Qualification for the Europa League league phase
8	Brighton & Hove Albion	38	14	11	13	52	46	+6	53	Qualification for the Conference League play-off round
9	Brentford	38	14	11	13	55	52	+3	53	
10	Chelsea	38	14	10	14	58	52	+6	52	
11	Fulham	38	15	7	16	47	51	−4	52	
12	Newcastle United	38	14	7	17	53	55	−2	49	
13	Everton	38	13	10	15	47	50	−3	49	
14	Leeds United	38	11	14	13	49	56	−7	47	
15	Crystal Palace	38	11	12	15	41	51	−10	45	Qualification for the Europa League league phase (Note: Crystal Palace qualified for the Europa League league phase as the 2025–26 UEFA Conference League winners.)
16	Nottingham Forest	38	11	11	16	48	51	−3	44	
17	Tottenham Hotspur	38	10	11	17	48	57	−9	41	
18	West Ham United (R)	38	10	9	19	46	65	−19	39	Relegation to EFL Championship
19	Burnley (R)	38	4	10	24	38	75	−37	22	Relegation to EFL Championship
20	Wolverhampton Wanderers (R)	38	3	11	24	27	68	−41	20	Relegation to EFL Championship

Source: Premier League
Rules for classification: 1) Points; 2) Goal difference; 3) Goals scored; 4) If the champions, relegated teams or qualified teams for UEFA competitions cannot be determined by rules 1 to 3, rules 4.1 to 4.3 are applied – 4.1) Points gained in head-to-head record between such teams; 4.2) Away goals scored in head-to-head record between such teams; 4.3) Play-offs
(C) Champions; (R) Relegated

== Results ==
Home \ Away	ARS	AVL	BOU	BRE	BHA	BUR	CHE	CRY	EVE	FUL	LEE	LIV	MCI	MUN	NEW	NFO	SUN	TOT	WHU	WOL
Arsenal	—	4–1	1–2	2–0	2–1	1–0	2–1	1–0	2–0	3–0	5–0	0–0	1–1	2–3	1–0	3–0	3–0	4–1	2–0	2–1
Aston Villa	2–1	—	4–0	0–1	1–0	2–1	1–4	0–3	0–1	3–1	1–1	4–2	1–0	2–1	0–0	3–1	4–3	1–2	2–0	1–0
Bournemouth	2–3	1–1	—	0–0	2–1	1–1	0–0	3–0	0–1	3–1	2–2	3–2	1–1	2–2	0–0	2–0	1–1	3–2	2–2	1–0
Brentford	1–1	1–0	4–1	—	0–2	3–1	2–2	2–2	2–2	0–0	1–1	3–2	0–1	3–1	3–1	0–2	3–0	0–0	3–0	2–2
Brighton & Hove Albion	0–1	3–4	1–1	2–1	—	2–0	3–0	0–1	1–1	1–1	3–0	2–1	2–1	0–3	2–1	2–1	0–0	2–2	1–1	3–0
Burnley	0–2	2–2	0–0	3–4	0–2	—	0–2	0–1	0–0	2–3	2–0	0–1	0–1	2–2	1–3	1–1	2–0	2–2	0–2	1–1
Chelsea	1–1	1–2	2–2	2–0	1–3	1–1	—	0–0	2–0	2–0	2–2	2–1	0–3	0–1	0–1	1–3	1–2	2–1	3–2	3–0
Crystal Palace	1–2	0–0	3–3	2–0	0–0	2–3	1–3	—	2–2	1–1	0–0	2–1	0–3	1–2	2–1	1–1	0–0	0–1	0–0	1–0
Everton	0–1	0–0	1–2	2–4	2–0	2–0	3–0	2–1	—	2–0	1–1	1–2	3–3	0–1	1–4	3–0	1–3	0–3	1–1	1–1
Fulham	0–1	1–0	0–1	3–1	2–1	3–1	2–1	1–2	1–2	—	1–0	2–2	4–5	1–1	2–0	1–0	1–0	2–1	0–1	3–0
Leeds United	0–4	1–2	2–2	0–0	1–0	3–1	3–1	4–1	1–0	1–0	—	3–3	0–1	1–1	0–0	3–1	0–1	1–2	2–1	3–0
Liverpool	1–0	2–0	4–2	1–1	2–0	1–1	1–1	3–1	2–1	2–0	0–0	—	1–2	1–2	4–1	0–3	1–1	1–1	5–2	2–1
Manchester City	2–1	1–2	3–1	3–0	1–1	5–1	1–1	3–0	2–0	3–0	3–2	3–0	—	3–0	2–1	2–2	3–0	0–2	3–0	2–0
Manchester United	0–1	3–1	4–4	2–1	4–2	3–2	2–1	2–1	0–1	3–2	1–2	3–2	2–0	—	1–0	3–2	2–0	2–0	1–1	1–1
Newcastle United	1–2	0–2	1–2	2–3	3–1	2–1	2–2	2–0	2–3	2–1	4–3	2–3	2–1	2–1	—	2–0	1–2	2–2	3–1	1–0
Nottingham Forest	0–0	1–1	1–1	3–1	0–2	4–1	0–3	1–1	0–2	0–0	3–1	0–1	1–2	2–2	1–1	—	0–1	3–0	0–3	0–0
Sunderland	2–2	1–1	3–2	2–1	0–1	3–0	2–1	2–1	1–1	1–3	1–1	0–1	0–0	0–0	1–0	0–5	—	1–0	3–0	2–0
Tottenham Hotspur	1–4	1–2	0–1	2–0	2–2	3–0	0–1	1–3	1–0	1–2	1–1	1–2	2–2	2–2	1–2	0–3	1–1	—	1–2	1–1
West Ham United	0–1	2–3	0–0	0–2	2–2	3–2	1–5	1–2	2–1	0–1	3–0	0–2	1–1	1–1	3–1	1–2	3–1	0–3	—	4–0
Wolverhampton Wanderers	2–2	2–0	0–2	0–2	1–1	2–3	1–3	0–2	2–3	1–1	1–3	2–1	0–4	1–4	0–0	0–1	1–1	0–1	3–0	—

Source: Premier League
Legend: Blue = home team win; Yellow = draw; Red = away team win.

== Season statistics ==
=== Top scorers ===
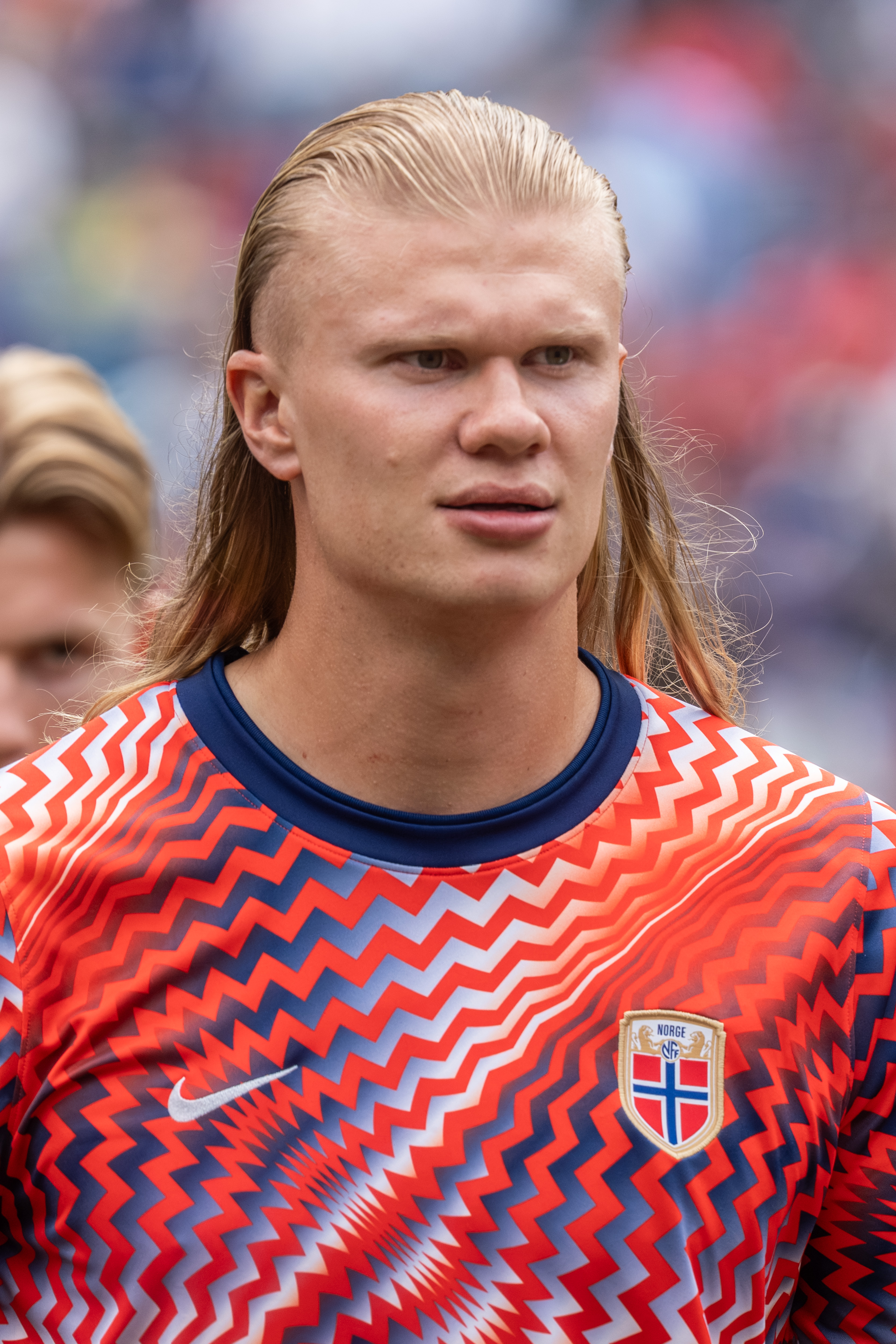
Erling Haaland won his third Premier League Golden Boot in four seasons after scoring 27 goals for Manchester City.

Rank	Player	Club	Goals
1	(Norway) Erling Haaland	Manchester City	27
2	(Brazil) Igor Thiago	Brentford	22
3	(Ghana) Antoine Semenyo	Bournemouth / Manchester City	17
4	(England) Ollie Watkins	Aston Villa	16
5	(England) Morgan Gibbs-White	Nottingham Forest	15
5	(Brazil) João Pedro	Chelsea	15
7	(England) Dominic Calvert-Lewin	Leeds United	14
7	(Sweden) Viktor Gyökeres	Arsenal	14
9	(France) Eli Junior Kroupi	Bournemouth	13
9	(England) Danny Welbeck	Brighton & Hove Albion	13

==== Hat-tricks ====
Player	For	Against	Result	Date
(France) Jean-Philippe Mateta	Crystal Palace	Bournemouth	3–3 (H)	18 October 2025
(England) Eberechi Eze	Arsenal	Tottenham Hotspur	4–1 (H)	23 November 2025
(Germany) Kevin Schade	Brentford	Bournemouth	4–1 (H)	27 December 2025
(Brazil) Igor Thiago	Brentford	Everton	4–2 (A)	4 January 2026
(England) Cole Palmer	Chelsea	Wolverhampton Wanderers	3–1 (A)	7 February 2026
(Brazil) João Pedro	Chelsea	Aston Villa	4–1 (A)	4 March 2026
(England) Morgan Gibbs-White	Nottingham Forest	Burnley	4–1 (H)	19 April 2026

=== Clean sheets ===
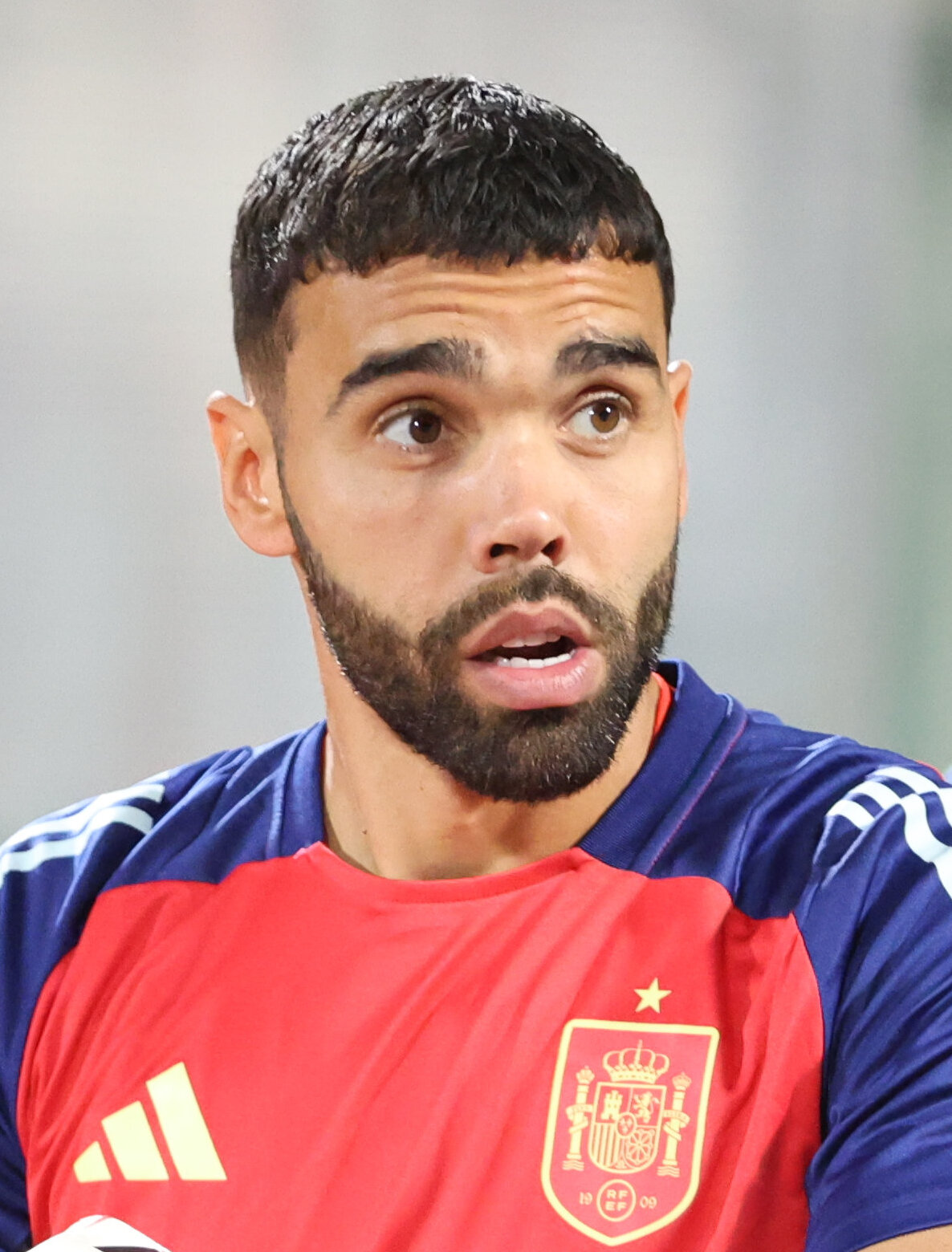
David Raya won his third Premier League Golden Glove in a row after keeping 19 clean sheets for Arsenal.

Rank	Player	Club	Clean sheets
1	(Spain) David Raya	Arsenal	19
2	(Italy) Gianluigi Donnarumma	Manchester City	15
3	(England) Dean Henderson	Crystal Palace	11
3	(Serbia) Đorđe Petrović	Bournemouth	11
3	(England) Jordan Pickford	Everton	11
6	(Republic of Ireland) Caoimhín Kelleher	Brentford	10
6	(Netherlands) Robin Roefs	Sunderland	10
6	(Netherlands) Bart Verbruggen	Brighton & Hove Albion	10
9	(Germany) Bernd Leno	Fulham	9
9	(Spain) Robert Sánchez	Chelsea	9

=== Discipline ===
==== Player ====
- Most yellow cards: 12
  - (Brazil) André (Wolverhampton Wanderers)
  - (England) James Garner (Everton)
- Most red cards: 2
  - (France) Wesley Fofana (Chelsea)
  - (Argentina) Cristian Romero (Tottenham Hotspur)

==== Club ====
- Most yellow cards: 99
  - Tottenham Hotspur
- Fewest yellow cards: 51
  - Arsenal
- Most red cards: 8
  - Chelsea
- Fewest red cards: 0
  - Arsenal
  - Brighton & Hove Albion
  - Manchester City

== Awards ==
=== Monthly awards ===
Month	Manager of the Month		Player of the Month		Goal of the Month		Save of the Month		References
Month	Manager	Club	Player	Club	Player	Club	Player	Club	References
August	(Netherlands) Arne Slot	Liverpool	(England) Jack Grealish	Everton	(Hungary) Dominik Szoboszlai	Liverpool	(England) James Trafford	Manchester City	
September	(Austria) Oliver Glasner	Crystal Palace	(Norway) Erling Haaland	Manchester City	(Spain) Martín Zubimendi	Arsenal	(Italy) Gianluigi Donnarumma	Manchester City	
October	(Portugal) Ruben Amorim	Manchester United	(Cameroon) Bryan Mbeumo	Manchester United	(Argentina) Emiliano Buendía	Aston Villa	(Slovakia) Martin Dúbravka	Burnley	
November	(Italy) Enzo Maresca	Chelsea	(Brazil) Igor Thiago	Brentford	(United States) Tyler Adams	Bournemouth	(England) Jordan Pickford	Everton	
December	(Spain) Unai Emery	Aston Villa	(England) Dominic Calvert-Lewin	Leeds United	(Wales) Harry Wilson	Fulham	(Spain) David Raya	Arsenal	
January	(England) Michael Carrick	Manchester United	(Brazil) Igor Thiago	Brentford	(England) Harrison Reed	Fulham	(France) Alphonse Areola	West Ham United	
February	(Spain) Pep Guardiola	Manchester City	(Ghana) Antoine Semenyo	Manchester City	(England) Dominic Solanke	Tottenham Hotspur	(England) Jordan Pickford	Everton	
March	(Spain) Mikel Arteta	Arsenal	(Portugal) Bruno Fernandes	Manchester United	(Denmark) William Osula	Newcastle United	(England) Aaron Ramsdale	Newcastle United	
April	(Spain) Pep Guardiola	Manchester City	(England) Morgan Gibbs-White	Nottingham Forest	(Japan) Kaoru Mitoma	Brighton & Hove Albion	(Wales) Karl Darlow	Leeds United	

=== Annual awards ===
- The best match of the 2025/26 Premier League season Arsenal 2–3 Manchester United

Award	Winner	Club
Premier League Manager of the Season	(Spain) Mikel Arteta	Arsenal
Premier League Player of the Season	(Portugal) Bruno Fernandes	Manchester United
Premier League Playmaker of the Season	(Portugal) Bruno Fernandes	Manchester United
Premier League Young Player of the Season	(England) Nico O'Reilly	Manchester City
Premier League Transfer of the Season	(Belgium) Senne Lammens	Manchester United
Premier League Goal of the Season	(England) Harrison Reed	Fulham
Premier League Save of the Season	(England) Jordan Pickford	Everton
PFA Players' Player of the Year	(Portugal) Bruno Fernandes	Manchester United
PFA Young Player of the Year	(England) Nico O'Reilly	Manchester City
FWA Footballer of the Year	(Portugal) Bruno Fernandes	Manchester United

PFA Team of the Year
Goalkeeper	(Spain) David Raya (Arsenal)			
Defenders	(Netherlands) Jurriën Timber (Arsenal)	(Brazil) Gabriel (Arsenal)	(France) William Saliba (Arsenal)	(England) Nico O'Reilly (Manchester City)
Midfielders	(France) Rayan Cherki (Manchester City)		(England) Declan Rice (Arsenal)	(Portugal) Bruno Fernandes (Manchester United)
Forwards	(Brazil) Igor Thiago (Brentford)		(Norway) Erling Haaland (Manchester City)	(Ghana) Antoine Semenyo ( Bournemouth / Manchester City)

Premier League Fan Team of the Season
Goalkeeper	(Spain) David Raya (Arsenal)			
Defenders	(Netherlands) Jurriën Timber (Arsenal)	(Brazil) Gabriel (Arsenal)	(France) William Saliba (Arsenal)	(England) Nico O'Reilly (Manchester City)
Midfielders	(Hungary) Dominik Szoboszlai (Liverpool)		(England) Declan Rice (Arsenal)	(Portugal) Bruno Fernandes (Manchester United)
Forwards	(Brazil) Igor Thiago (Brentford)		(Norway) Erling Haaland (Manchester City)	(Ghana) Antoine Semenyo (Bournemouth / Manchester City)

== Attendances ==
Premier League clubs listed by average home league attendance in the 2025–26 season:

Pos	Club	Average attendance
1	Manchester United	73,975
2	West Ham United	62,347
3	Liverpool FC	60,389
4	Arsenal	60,217
5	Tottenham Hotspur	59,702
6	Manchester City	52,640
7	Newcastle United	52,161
8	Everton	52,132
9	Sunderland AFC	46,578
10	Aston Villa	41,977
11	Chelsea	39,602
12	Leeds United	36,695
13	Brighton & Hove Albion	31,379
14	Nottingham Forest	30,425
15	Wolverhampton Wanderers	29,835
16	Fulham	27,228
17	Crystal Palace	24,925
18	Burnley FC	21,005
19	Brentford FC	17,132
20	AFC Bournemouth	11,175
