= Fulham F.C. =

Association football club in London, England

Fulham
- Full name: Fulham Football Club
- Nickname: The Cottagers
- Short name: FFC
- Founded: September 1879; 147 years ago (as St Andrews Cricket & Football Club)
- Ground: Craven Cottage
- Capacity: 28,107
- Owner: Shahid Khan
- Chairman: Shahid Khan
- Head coach: Álvaro Arbeloa
- League: Premier League
- 2025–26: Premier League, 11th of 20
- Website: fulhamfc.com
Home colours	Away colours	Third colours

Fulham Football Club is a professional football club based in Fulham, South West London, England. The club competes in the Premier League, the top tier of English football. Founded in 1879, they have played home games at Craven Cottage since 1896. Fulham contest West London derby rivalries with Chelsea, Brentford and Queens Park Rangers. The club adopted a white shirt and black shorts as its kit in 1896, which has been used ever since.

Founded in 1879, they are London's oldest professional football club. They joined the Southern League in 1898 and won two First Division titles (1905–06 and 1906–07), as well as two Second Division titles and a Western League title. Elected into the Second Division of the Football League in 1907, Fulham would win the Third Division South in 1931–32, four years after being relegated. They won the Second Division title in 1948–49, though were relegated after three seasons. Promoted back to the First Division again in 1958–59, the form of star player Johnny Haynes helped Fulham to remain in the top-flight until consecutive relegations occurred by 1969. They were promoted in 1970–71 and went on to reach the final of the 1974–75 FA Cup.

Fulham drifted between the second and fourth tiers until being taken over by Mohamed Al-Fayed in 1997. They went on to win two divisional titles in three seasons to reach the Premier League by 2001. They won the UEFA Intertoto Cup in 2002 and were beaten in the 2010 final of the UEFA Europa League. However, 13 consecutive seasons in the top flight culminated in relegation in 2014. Since then, the club have moved between the first and second tiers under new owner Shahid Khan. Fulham changed divisions in five successive seasons between 2017–18 to 2021–22, being relegated after winning the 2018 and 2020 EFL Championship play-off finals. They then won the 2021–22 EFL Championship title, settling in the Premier League since 2022.

== History ==
=== 1879–1907: Formation and Southern League years ===
The Second XI team, in 1886

Fulham were formed in 1879 as Fulham St Andrew's Church Sunday School F.C., founded by worshippers (mostly adept at cricket) at the Church of England on Star Road, West Kensington (St Andrew's, Fulham Fields). Fulham's mother church still stands today with a plaque commemorating the team's foundation. They won the West London Amateur Cup in 1887 and, having shortened the name from Fulham St Andrews to its present form in December 1888, they then won the West London League in 1893 at the first attempt. One of the club's first ever kits was half red, half white shirts with white shorts worn in the 1886–87 season. Fulham started playing at their current ground at Craven Cottage in 1896, their first game against now defunct rivals Minerva.

Postcard of the 1903–04 line-up

The club gained professional status on 12 December 1898, the same year that they were admitted into the Southern League's Second Division. They were the third club from London to turn professional, following Arsenal, then named Royal Arsenal 1891, and Millwall in 1893. They adopted a red and white kit during the 1896–97 season. In 1902–03, the club won promotion from this division, entering the Southern League First Division. The club's first recorded all-white club kit came in 1903, and ever since then the club has been playing in all-white shirts and black shorts, with socks going through various evolutions of black, white, or both, but now are normally only white. The club won the Southern League twice, in 1905–06 and 1906–07.

=== 1907–1949: Football League ===
The "Rabbit Hutch" stand along Stevenage Road sometime before Archibald Leitch's redesign in 1904–05

Fulham joined The Football League after the second of their Southern League triumphs. The club's first league game, playing in the Second Division's 1907–08 season, saw them lose 1–0 at home to Hull City in September 1907. The first win came a few days later at Derby County's Baseball Ground by a score line of 1–0. Fulham finished the season three points short of promotion in fourth place. The club progressed all the way to the semi-final of that season's FA Cup, a run that included an 8–3 away win at Luton Town. In the semi-final, however, they were heavily beaten, 6–0, by Newcastle United. This is still a record loss for an FA Cup semi-final game. Two years later, the club won the London Challenge Cup in the 1909–10 season. Fulham's first season in Division Two turned out to be the highest that the club would finish for 21 years, until in 1927–28 when the club were relegated to the 3rd Division South, created in 1920. Hussein Hegazi, an Egyptian forward, was one of the first non-British players to appear in The Football League, though he only played one game for Fulham in 1911, marked with a goal, afterwards playing for non-league Dulwich Hamlet.

During this period, businessman and politician Henry Norris was the club chairman and curiously he had an indirect role in the foundation of Fulham's local rivals Chelsea. When he rejected an offer from businessman Gus Mears to move Fulham to land where the present-day Chelsea stadium Stamford Bridge is situated, Mears decided to create his own team to occupy the ground. In 1910, Norris started to combine his role at Fulham with the chairmanship of Arsenal. Fulham became the first British team to sell hot dogs at their ground in 1926. Fulham had several high-profile international players during the 1920s, including Len Oliver and Albert Barrett.

Yearly performance of Fulham in the Football League

After finishing fifth, seventh and ninth (out of 22 teams) in their first three seasons in the Third Division South, Fulham won the division in the 1931–32 season. In doing so they beat Torquay United 10–2, won 24 out of 42 games and scored 111 goals, thus being promoted back to the Second Division. The next season they missed out on a second consecutive promotion, finishing third behind Tottenham Hotspur and Stoke City. A mixed bag of league performances followed, although the club also reached another FA Cup semi-final during the 1935–36 season. Fulham were also to draw with Austria in 1936 before Anschluss. On 8 October 1938, Craven Cottage saw its all-time highest attendance at a match against Millwall, with a crowd of 49,335 watching the game.

League and cup football were severely disrupted by the outbreak of World War II in 1939, with the Football League split into regional divisions temporarily, with a national Football League War Cup and a London War Cup up for grabs. Craven Cottage was used like many grounds for fitness and training of the army youth reserves. Post-war, a full league programme was only restored for 1946–47. In the third season of what is now considered the modern era of football, Fulham finished top of the Second Division, with a win–loss–draw record of 24–9–9 (identical to that which won them the Third Division South 17 years previously). John Fox Watson made a pioneering transfer to Real Madrid in 1948, becoming one of the first players from the United Kingdom to sign for a high-profile side abroad.

=== 1949–1970: First Division Cottagers ===
Promotion to the top tier of English football saw the club perform poorly, finishing 17th in their first year and 18th in their second. In only their third season of First Division football, Fulham finished rock bottom of the 22-team league in the 1951–52 season, winning only eight of 42 games. On 20 May 1951, Fulham played one of their first ever games in North America in an exhibition match against Celtic at Delorimier Stadium in Montreal in front of 29,000 spectators.

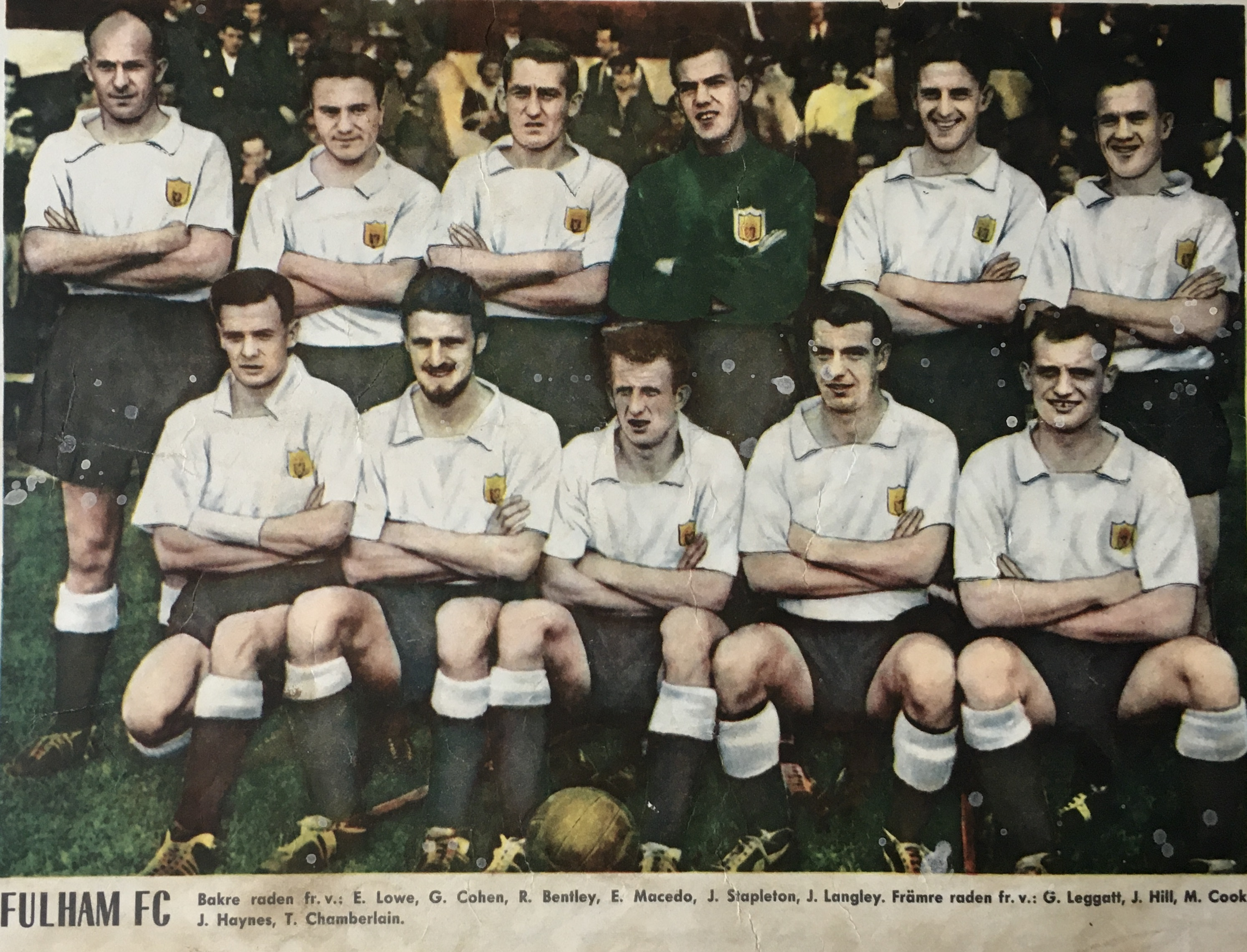
Fulham FC in 1958 with Johnny Haynes, player number two from right in the front line

Possibly the single most influential character in Fulham's history is Johnny Haynes. "Mr. Fulham" or "The Maestro", as Haynes later came to be known, signed for The Cottagers as a schoolboy in 1950, making his first team debut on Boxing Day against Southampton at Craven Cottage in the 1951/52 relegation season. Haynes played for another 18 years, notching 657 appearances (along with many other club records too), his last appearance for Fulham coming on 17 January 1970. He is often considered as the greatest player in Fulham history, and never played for another team in Britain. He gained 56 caps for England (22 as captain), with many being earned while playing for Fulham in the Second Division. Haynes was injured in a car accident in Blackpool in 1962, but by his own admissions never regained the fitness or form to play for England again, missing out on England's victory in the 1966 FIFA World Cup for which he would have stood a chance of being selected. The Stevenage Road Stand was renamed in his honour after his death in a car crash in 2005.

Fulham reached the 1957–58 FA Cup semi-finals, the best cup run of Haynes' career and nearest he came to a major trophy win playing in England. They were eliminated in a replay by the remnants of Manchester United's Busby Babes team that had been decimated in the Munich air disaster the month before. United were the first top division team Fulham played in that cup run. Fulham won promotion back to the First Division in the following season by finishing second to Sheffield Wednesday. Also joining Fulham in 1958 was Graham Leggat, who went on to score 134 goals in 277 appearances, (making him the club's fifth all-time top scorer). In the 1959–60 season, they achieved tenth position in the First Division, which until finishing ninth in the 2003–04 season was their highest-ever league position. This accompanied another appearance in the last four of the FA Cup in 1962. By this time, the club were regularly playing in front of 30,000 plus crowds at Craven Cottage, despite struggling in the league.

The club earned a reputation for constantly battling against relegation most seasons, with numerous narrow escapes; none more so than in 1965–66. On the morning of 26 February 1966, Fulham were bottom with just 15 points from 29 matches. The last 13 games saw Fulham win nine and draw two to reach safety. Eventually, however, the club suffered relegation in the 1967–68 season, having won just ten out of their 42 games. Even that, however, was not as catastrophic as the calamity of next season. Winning only seven in 42, the club were relegated to the Third Division.

=== 1970–1994: Mixed fortunes outside the top flight ===
The aforementioned Third Division hiatus lasted only two seasons before the club was promoted back to the Second Division as runners-up in 1970–71. This spell also saw Fulham invited to the Anglo-Italian Cup, which saw the club draw four out of four games in 1972–73 season. This preceded a period of high-profile signings for the club under Alec Stock in the mid-1970s, including Alan Mullery and Bobby Moore. Fulham reached their only FA Cup final to date in 1975, having won their first semi-final in five attempts. The club lost 2–0 to West Ham United in the final at Wembley Stadium. This gained the club qualification for another European tournament, the Anglo-Scottish Cup, where they reached the final, losing to Middlesbrough.

George Best played 47 times for the club in the 1976–77 season. Rodney Marsh, who having grown up with Fulham in the 1960s went on to play First Division football and play for England, rejoined the club in the same season, playing only 16 games. This capped one of the most successful eras in Fulham history.

The club were relegated again after winning only 11 in 42 matches in the 1979–80 season, which eventually resulted in Bobby Campbell's dismissal in October 1980, to be replaced by Malcolm Macdonald. With a strong squad during his 1980–1984 period in charge (with players such as Ray Houghton, Tony Gale, Paul Parker, Gerry Peyton and Ray Lewington), they won promotion again in 1981–82 back to the Second Division, although the promotion was overshadowed by the suicide of former defender Dave Clement a few weeks before promotion was sealed.

In 1980, Fulham founded the rugby league club that is now London Broncos designed to be an extra stream of income for the football club, but which made financial losses every year while linked to Fulham F.C. Then called "Fulham Rugby League", they played at Craven Cottage until moving away from the parent club in 1984.

In 1978, Fulham had signed Gordon "Ivor" Davies who, during two spells at Fulham, became the club's leading goalscorer of all time with a total of 178 goals in all competitions; the record still stands. Fulham narrowly missed out on back-to-back promotions to the First Division, losing 1–0 to Derby County away on the last day of the 1982–83 season – although the match was abandoned after 88 minutes due to a pitch invasion and inexplicably never replayed or finished. The side which had shown so much promise was quickly sold off as the club were in debt, so it was little surprise when the club were relegated again to the Third Division in 1986. The club nearly went out of business in 1987 via an ill-advised merger attempt with Queens Park Rangers. It was only the intervention of ex-player Jimmy Hill that allowed the club to stay in business by formation of a new company, Fulham FC (1987) Ltd. In 1987, the club took part in what was then the longest penalty deciders ever recorded – it needed 28 spot kicks to sort out a winner between them and Aldershot following a Football League Trophy match. Fulham later broke the record when they played at Championship side Preston North End in the 2024 EFL Cup in 2024 when it took 31 spot kicks to separate the two teams.

In 1992, the foundation of the Premier League, and the resignation of 22 clubs from The Football League, restored Fulham to that league's Second Division. However, the club were relegated to the new Third Division after a poor 1993–94 season, following which Ian Branfoot was appointed as team manager.

=== 1994–1997: Fulham's lowest ebb ===
After an eighth-place finish in Branfoot's first season in charge, the club hit its lowest-ever final league position in the 1995–96 season, finishing 17th out of 24. Branfoot was dismissed as manager, but remained at the club in other capacities for a short while. In February 1996, Micky Adams became player-manager. Adams oversaw an upturn in form that lifted the side out of relegation danger. The next season, he engineered a second-place league finish, missing out on first place because several years previously the league had dropped the old "goal difference" system in favour of a "goals scored" tally, meaning Fulham finished behind Wigan Athletic. The club's chairman Jimmy Hill had argued in 1992 that goals scored should decide places of teams tied on points, and the Football League clubs had voted the system in.

=== 1997–2001: Al-Fayed takeover ===
Egyptian businessman Mohamed Al-Fayed bought the club for £6.75 million in the summer of 1997. The club was purchased via Bill Muddyman's Muddyman Group. Al-Fayed had Micky Adams replaced in the aftermath of a mid-table start to the season. He installed a two-tier management "dream team" of Ray Wilkins as First Team Manager and Kevin Keegan as chief operating officer, pledging that the club would reach the Premier League within five years. After an argument over team selection, Wilkins left the club in May 1998 to hand over the full managerial duties to Keegan. Keegan then helped steer the club to promotion the next season, winning 101 points out of a possible 138, after spending £1.1 million to sign Paul Peschisolido from West Bromwich Albion. Peschisolido was top scorer and captained by Chris Coleman – then the most expensive footballer outside the top two divisions of the English league.

In 1999, Keegan left Fulham to become manager of England, and Paul Bracewell was put in charge. Bracewell was dismissed in March 2000, as Fulham's promising early season form dwindled away to a mid-table finish. Frenchman Jean Tigana was put in charge and, having signed a number of young stars (including French striker Louis Saha), he guided Fulham to their third promotion in five seasons in the 2000–01 season, giving Fulham top-flight status for the first time since 1968. Fulham once again amassed 101 points out of a possible 138 in their scintillating title run, which was crowned with an open-top bus parade down Fulham Palace Road. They are the only team to have twice reached 100 points in a season. During the season, Chris Coleman was involved in a car crash that put him out of action for well over a year and eventually ended his playing career after he failed to make a sufficient recovery. Fulham's run through the divisions saw a large turnover of players, with the only player to play for the club in all four leagues being Sean Davis.

=== 2001–2007: Early Premier League years ===
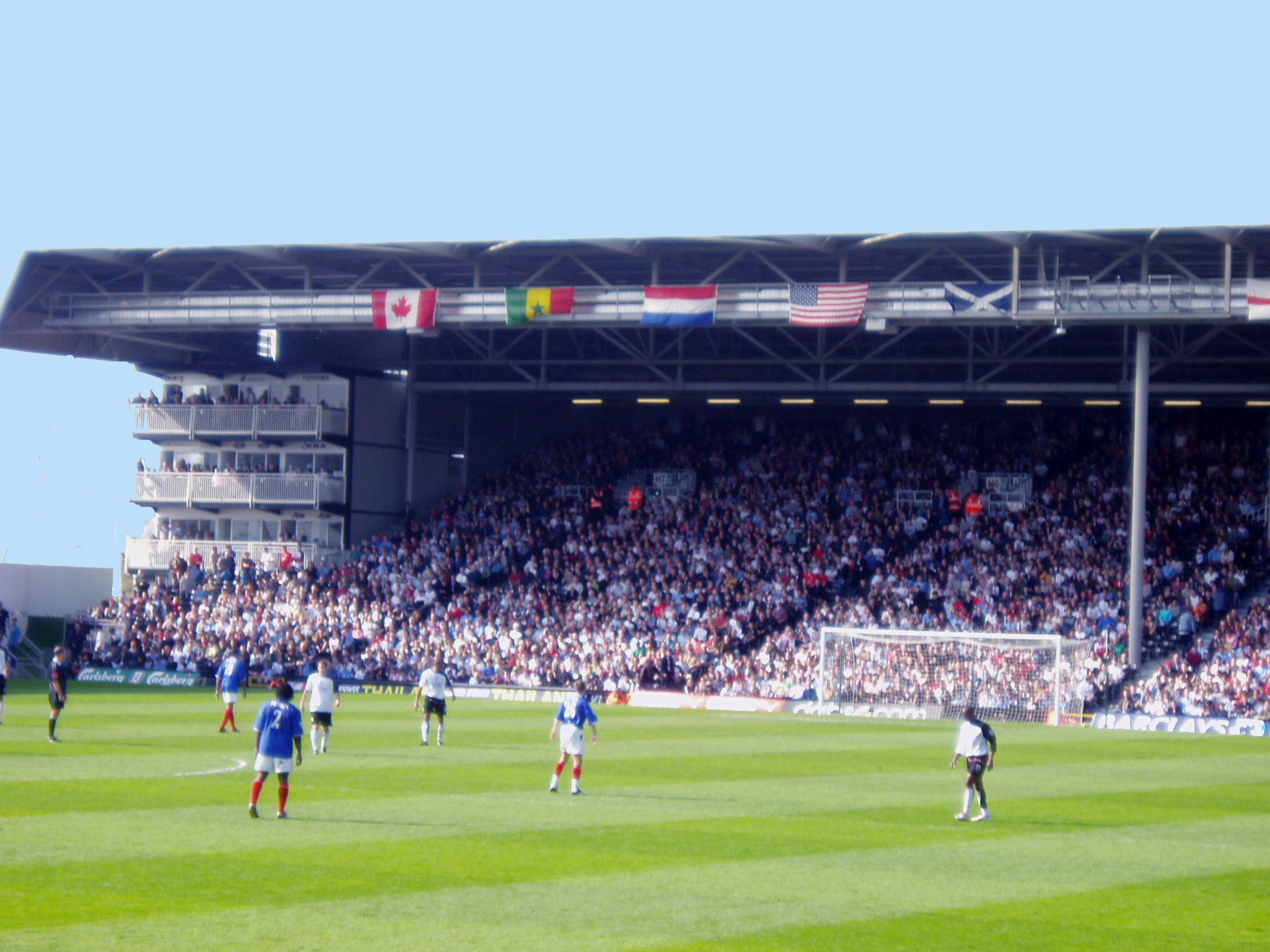
Fulham (white) playing Portsmouth (blue) in front of Fulham fans in the Hammersmith End

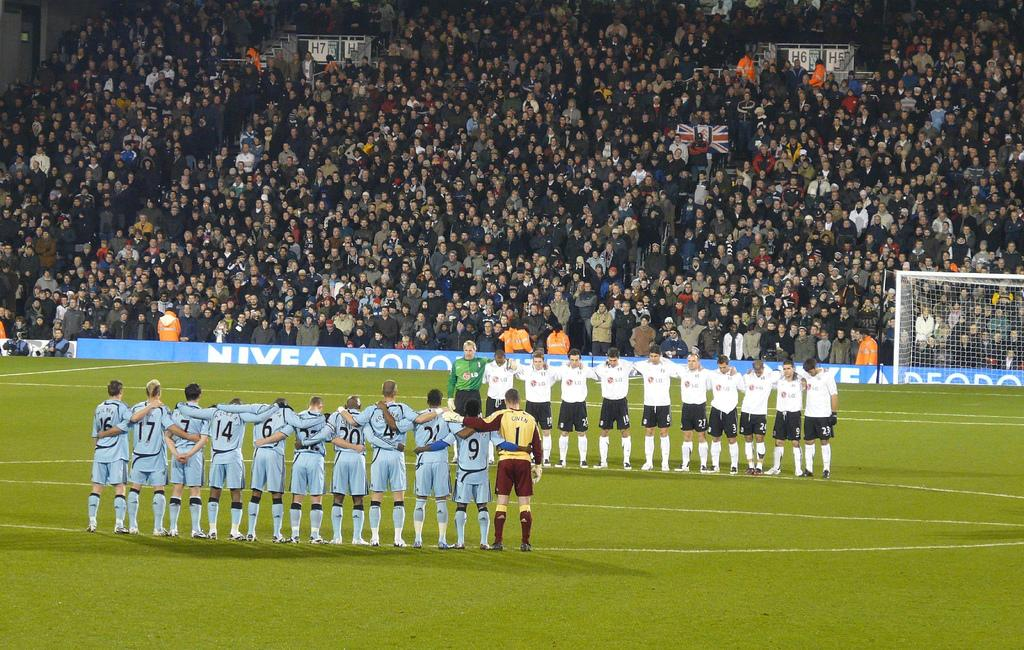
A minute's silence for Jim Langley

Fulham returned to the top division of English football, and competed in the Premier League for the first time. The club finished the 2001–02 season in 13th place. Fulham were the only team to host top-flight football with some standing areas in the 21st century, but due to restrictions on standing, this was not allowed to continue; clubs promoted from the second division had only three years to make their ground all-seater. Fulham were forced to groundshare with QPR at Loftus Road during the 2002–03 and 2003–04 seasons while Craven Cottage was rebuilt as an all-seated stadium. There were fears that Fulham would not return to the Cottage, after it was revealed that Al-Fayed had sold the first right to build on the ground to a property development firm.

The Cottagers were invited to the 2002 UEFA Intertoto Cup, which was the club's first appearance in a European competition. They advanced to the final where they defeated Bologna 5–3 on aggregate. They shared the title with Málaga and Stuttgart. As Intertoto Cup winners, Fulham qualified for the first round of the 2002–03 UEFA Cup. However, their European campaign ended in the third round with a 2–1 aggregate defeat to Hertha BSC.

In 2002–03, Fulham spent most of the season in the lower half of the table. Chairman Al-Fayed told manager Jean Tigana that his contract would not be renewed at the end of the season. However, with five games left to play and relegation still possible, Tigana was dismissed, and Chris Coleman was temporarily put in charge. Fulham won 10 points from a possible 15 and managed to avoid relegation. Coleman was appointed manager on a permanent basis in the summer of 2003; despite predictions that the inexperience of Coleman would result in Fulham's relegation, he kept the club well clear of relegation, guiding them to a club record ninth-place finish in his debut season. This might have been greater had the club not come under significant financial pressure to sell Louis Saha to Manchester United, for whom they received a then-club record £13 million.

Fulham lost a legal case against former manager Tigana in 2004 after Al-Fayed wrongly alleged that Tigana had overpaid more than £7 million for new players and had negotiated transfers in secret.

Coleman notched up another satisfactory performance in the 2004–05 season and guided Fulham to a secure 13th-place finish. The following season Fulham improved by one place, finishing 12th – the high point of the season was a 1–0 win over local rivals and reigning champions Chelsea in the West London derby – Chelsea had only lost two games in two and a half years. The 2006–07 season proved to be Coleman's last, as on 10 April 2007, Fulham terminated his contract with immediate effect. His replacement was Northern Ireland manager Lawrie Sanchez. Fulham only gained four points from five games with Sanchez as caretaker manager. They ensured top-flight survival that season by defeating a weakened Liverpool side 1–0 in the penultimate match of the season, and Sanchez was appointed manager.

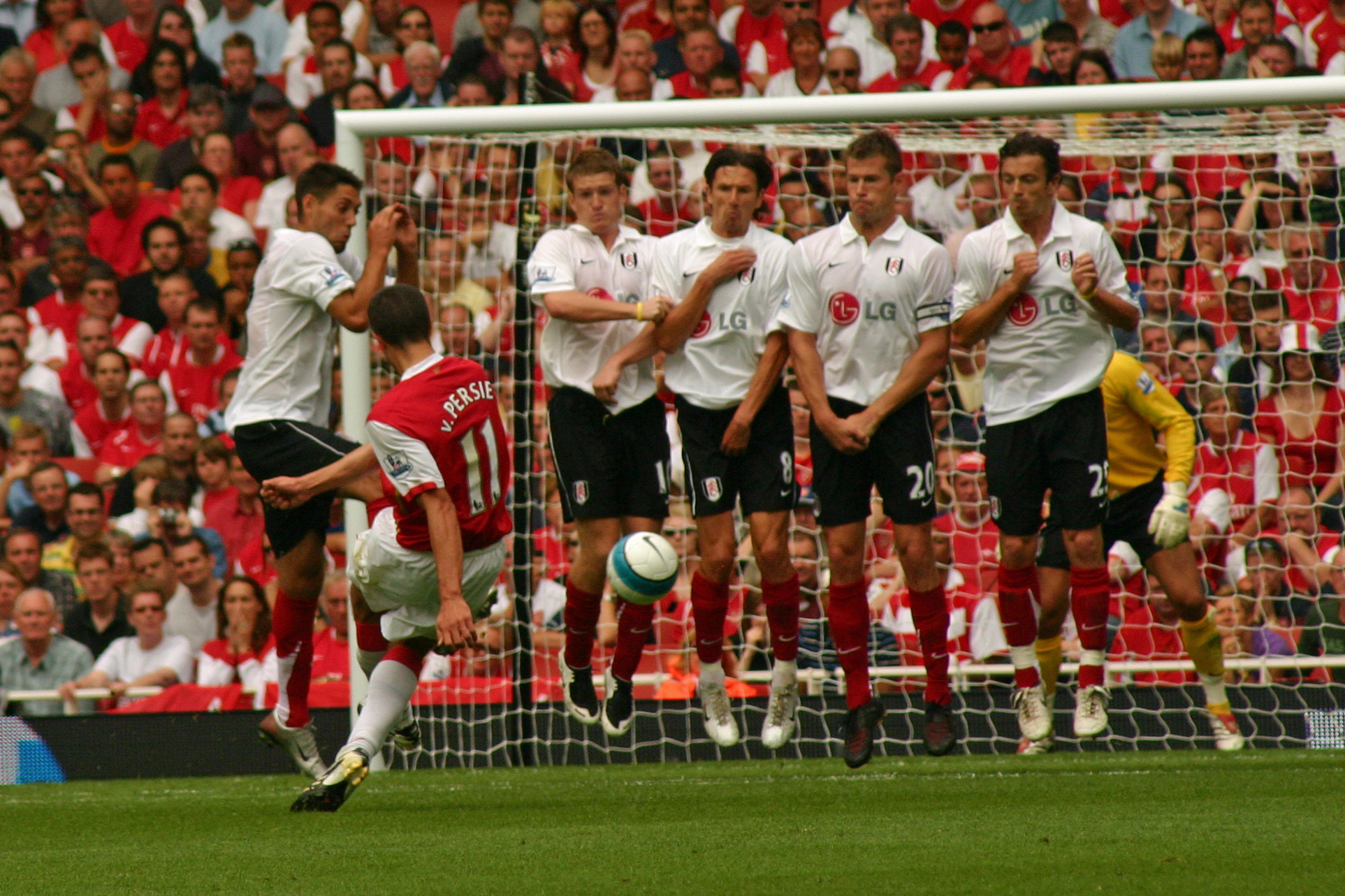
Robin van Persie takes a free kick as Fulham players form a defensive wall.

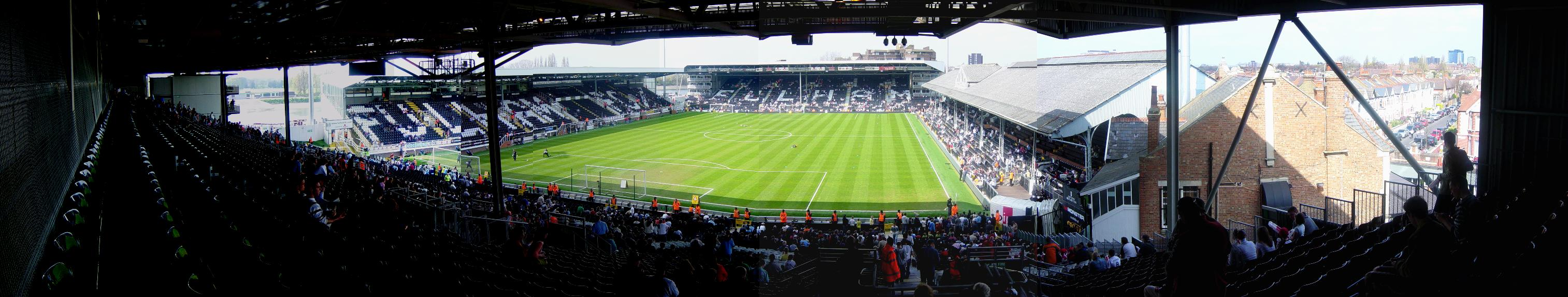
Craven Cottage, the home of Fulham FC, in 2007.

=== 2007–2010: Hodgson's transformation ===
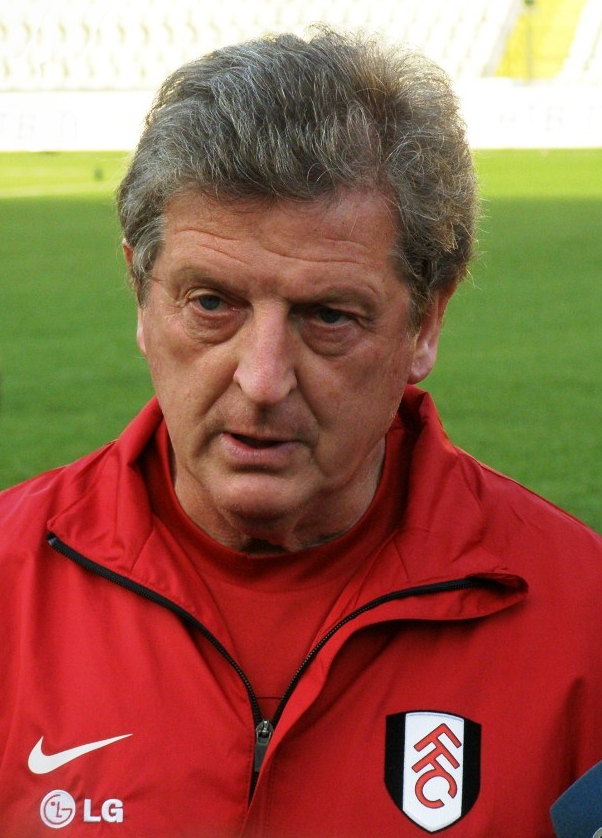
Roy Hodgson as manager at Fulham

Sanchez received strong financial backing from the board and made a number of signings during the summer break, but, after just two league wins in the first five months of the season and with Fulham in the relegation zone, he was dismissed on 21 December 2007 after a defeat to Newcastle United. Roy Hodgson was named as the new manager of Fulham on 28 December 2007 and took up his contractual duties on 30 December, just two days before the January transfer window opened.

Hodgson's tenure did not start well and it took a month to secure his first win, against Aston Villa, courtesy of a Jimmy Bullard free-kick. Fulham continued to struggle and a 3–1 home defeat in April at the hands of fellow strugglers Sunderland left Hodgson on the verge of tears in the post-match press conference and many pundits writing off Fulham's survival chances. The turning point of the season came in the third-to-last match, against Manchester City. Fulham trailed 2–0 at half-time and had the Premier League scores at that time become results, they would have been relegated. However, the introduction of Diomansy Kamara heralded the start of a fantastic comeback—Kamara struck twice as Fulham registered a 3–2 victory. Fulham then won a crucial match against fellow strugglers Birmingham City at Craven Cottage, leaving survival in the club's own hands. Barring a goal-rush from fellow strugglers Reading, a win against a Portsmouth side looking ahead to their fourth FA Cup final would guarantee survival. With 15 minutes to play at Portsmouth, Fulham were drawing, and with Birmingham City and Reading leading comfortably against Blackburn Rovers and Derby County respectively, they looked likely to be relegated. However, Fulham earned a free-kick with 76 minutes played; Jimmy Bullard's delivery found Danny Murphy, who headed home the decisive goal, sparking manic celebrations from the travelling fans. Hodgson had ensured survival against all odds, breaking several club records in the process and cementing his place in Fulham folklore. Fulham narrowly missed out on a UEFA Cup place via Fairplay by a dubious 0.8 of a point behind Manchester City, who lost 8–1 at Middlesbrough.

In the 2008–09 season, Fulham finished seventh, their highest-ever league placing, earning qualification for the inaugural UEFA Europa League, the second time that the club had entered a UEFA competition.

2009–10 was arguably the most successful season in the club's history. They were eliminated from the FA Cup in the quarter-finals for the second year running, and finished 12th in the Premier League, despite fielding weakened teams in the last few matches. In the inaugural Europa League season, however, Fulham reached the final, meeting Spanish club Atlético Madrid, at the Volksparkstadion in Hamburg. In their first European cup final, the Cottagers were beaten 2–1 after extra time, having drawn 1–1 after full-time. The achievement of taking Fulham so unexpectedly far, beating famous teams like Hamburger SV, Juventus, holders Shakhtar Donetsk and Basel in the competition, led to Roy Hodgson being voted the LMA Manager of the Year by the widest margin in the history of the award. The home match in the round of 16 was arguably Fulham's greatest result in the history of the club. Despite losing 3–1 in the first leg at Italian giants Juventus and falling behind minutes into the second leg at Craven Cottage, Fulham scored four goals with no reply from Juventus. At the end of the season, Hodgson left Fulham to manage Liverpool.

=== 2010–2013: Established in the Premier League ===
On 29 July 2010, Mark Hughes was named the successor to Hodgson, signing a two-year contract with the club. Hughes resigned as manager of Fulham on 2 June 2011, having spent fewer than 11 months at the club. The Whites had an encouraging finish in eighth position and qualified for the Europa League via Fairplay.

On 7 June 2011, Martin Jol signed a two-year contract with Fulham, becoming successor to Hughes. Fulham navigated their way with some ease to the group stage in the Europa League through late summer. However, the Cottagers were knocked out with the last seconds of the group stage matches, Odense Boldklub equalising, leaving Fulham in third place, with Polish side Wisła Kraków instead progressing to the next round.

Fulham's Premier League form in the 2011–12 season was mixed, with the continuing away-record hangover of previous seasons dragging on. In the 2012–13 season, Fulham finished the season in 12th place.

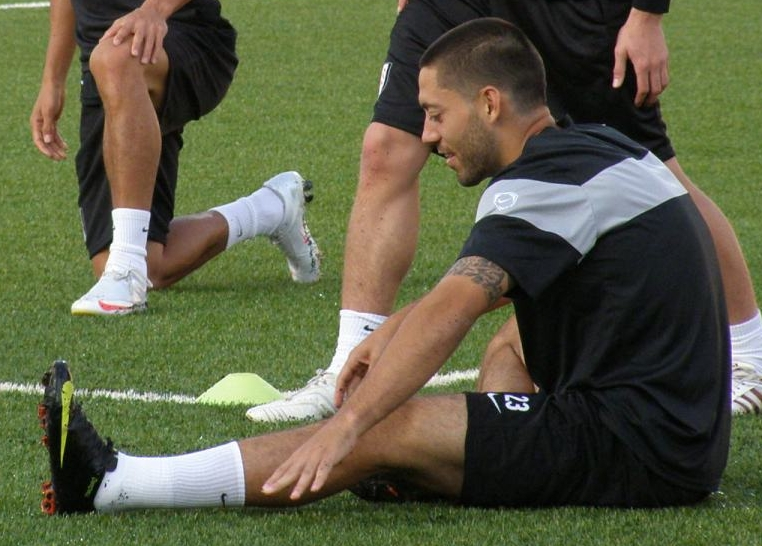
Clint Dempsey scored a club record 50 Premier League goals for Fulham between 2007 and 2012.

=== 2013–present: Shahid Khan's ownership ===
Shahid Khan took over as chairman in July 2013, but after a poor start to the 2013–14 season, having only amassed 10 points from 13 games, Martin Jol was dismissed as manager in December 2013, with René Meulensteen taking charge as head coach. Meulensteen was replaced by Felix Magath after just 17 games in charge following no upturn in form, but fortunes did not improve, and Fulham were eventually relegated to the Championship after a 4–1 defeat away to Stoke on 3 May.

Fulham broke the Championship transfer record that summer in a restructuring of the squad by Magath, but after a disastrous start to the new season, amassing just one point in seven games, Magath was dismissed in September 2014, with Kit Symons appointed as caretaker manager. Fulham eventually finished the season in 17th place. The team suffered an inconsistent start to the following season and after a 5–2 loss at home to Birmingham City, and lying in 12th place, Kit Symons was dismissed as manager in November 2015. It paved the way for Serbian Slaviša Jokanović to be appointed on 27 December 2015. Fulham's fortunes did not improve greatly following Jokanović's appointment, but the team finished the 2015–16 Championship season in 20th place, avoiding relegation by 11 points.

The 2016–17 season saw huge improvements in both results and performances. Despite an inconsistent start, the team saw a significant improvement from October onwards which saw them secure a 6th-place finish. They entered the play-offs, but lost to Reading 2–1 on aggregate in the semi-final. During this time, club owner Shahid Khan's son Tony Khan was named as Vice Chairman and Director of Football Operations, and he also holds the roles of General Manager and Sporting Director. Despite a slow start to the following season, the club went on a club-record 23 game unbeaten run in the league which led to a 3rd-place finish, just missing out on automatic promotion after a 1–3 away defeat to Birmingham City. The team went on to win the EFL Championship play-off final against Aston Villa to return to the Premier League on 26 May 2018.

During the season, the club signed Aleksandar Mitrović, initially on loan until the end of the season. Mitrović would go on to score more than 100 goals for the club, becoming the eighth player in Fulham's history to do so.

Following a poor start to life back in the Premier League, Jokanović was dismissed in November 2018 and replaced with former Leicester manager Claudio Ranieri. Results ultimately did not improve under Ranieri, as well as him alienating several key players, and he left the club in February 2019. He was replaced by Scott Parker as caretaker manager who could not save the club from relegation on 3 April 2019. Parker was appointed as manager on a permanent basis on 10 May 2019. In a season that was interrupted by the COVID-19 pandemic, Parker led the club straight back to the Premier League on 4 August 2020, defeating London rivals Brentford 2–1 in the play-off final after a fourth-place finish. However, the club would once again be relegated after just a single season back in the top flight after a 2–0 defeat to Burnley on 10 May 2021.

In the aftermath of relegation, Parker left the club by mutual consent and was replaced by former Everton manager Marco Silva. After relegation, Fulham under Silva earned promotion back to the top tier with four games to go, winning the 2021–22 Championship title. Fulham started the 2022–23 Premier League season much better than prior years. At the halfway point, Fulham sat in 6th place, had tallied a 2–1 win over West London rivals Chelsea, whom they had not defeated in nearly 16 years, and collected a string of four consecutive top-flight victories for the first time since April 1966. The following season saw the club reach the semi-finals of the EFL Cup for the first time, and in 2024–25 they recorded a new club Premier League record points haul.

Fulham produced another solid performance in 2025–26 season, finishing 11th and without any risk of relegation. After five years in change, Marco Silva left at the end of the season to take over at Benfica. He was soon replaced by former Real Madrid manager Álvaro Arbeloa, who agreed a three-year contract.

== Grounds ==
Between the years 1879 and when Fulham had a ground to call their own in 1896, they played at a number of stadiums, only some of which were recorded and this should not be regarded as a full or complete list. Only rivals and former landlords Queens Park Rangers have played at more home stadiums. Some of the early grounds listed below are likely to have been parks and parkland, which have now been developed. Even when the club purchased Craven Cottage and the surrounding land in 1894, they had to wait two years before they could play a game there.

- 1879–1883: 'The Mud Pond', Star Road, Fulham
- 1883–1886: Lillie Road, Fulham
- 1886–1888: Ranelagh House, Fulham
- 1888–1889: Barn Elms Playing Fields, Barnes (this was the site of The Ranelagh Club)
- 1889–1891: Parsons Green, Fulham and Roskell's Fields (next to Parsons Green Underground station)
- 1891–1895: The Half Moon, Putney
- 1895–1896: Captain James Field, near Halford Road, West Brompton
- 1896–2002: Craven Cottage, Fulham
- 2002–2004: Loftus Road, Shepherd's Bush (groundshare with Queens Park Rangers during Craven Cottage's renovation)
- 2004–present: Craven Cottage, Fulham

== Club identity ==
=== Kit ===
Fulham adopted a white shirt and black shorts as its kit in 1896, which has been used ever since. Fulham's sponsorship by Betfair in 2002–03 was the first gambling sponsorship in English football, and came before the Gambling Act 2005 permitted the industry to advertise on television and radio; within fifteen years half of Premier League teams were sponsored by such companies.

On 27 July 2021, it was announced that World Mobile would become the official principal partner for the next three years.

In July 2022, it was announced that the gambling company W88 would sponsor the team in a kit deal for the 2022–23 season. The deal saw the betting firm's logo placed on the front of both the men's and women's kit. The confirmation of the deal came during a decrease in gambling sponsors for Premier League teams. In June 2023, it was announced that betting company SBOBET would replace W88 as the team's main sponsor for the 2023–24 season. In February 2024, it was announced that FlyFish Limited would become an official partner.

Period	Kit manufacturer	Shirt sponsor (chest)	Shirt sponsor (sleeve)	Shirt sponsor (back)	Shorts sponsor
1974–1977	Umbro	None	None	None	None
1977–1981	Adidas	None	None	None	None
1981–1984	Osca	None	None	None	None
1984–1985	Umbro	William Younger	None	None	None
1985–1987	Umbro	Prestige Travel	None	None	None
1987	Scoreline	None	None	None	None
1988	Scoreline	Emirates	None	None	None
1988–1990	Scoreline	TeleConnect	None	None	None
1990–1991	Ribero	TeleConnect	None	None	None
1991–1992	Ribero	None	None	None	None
1992–1993	DMF Sportswear	None	None	None	None
1993–1996	Vandanel	GMB	None	None	None
1996–1997	Le Coq Sportif	GMB	None	None	None
1997–1998	Adidas	GMB	None	None	None
1998–2001	Adidas	Demon Internet	None	None	None
2001–2002	Adidas	Pizza Hut	None	None	None
2002–2003	Adidas	Betfair.com	None	None	None
2003–2005	Puma	dabs.com	None	None	None
2005–2006	Puma	Pipex	None	None	None
2006–2007	Airness	Pipex	None	None	None
2007–2010	Nike	LG	None	None	None
2010–2013	Kappa	FxPro	None	None	None
2013–2015	Adidas	Marathonbet	None	None	None
2015–2017	Adidas	Visit Florida	None	None	None
2017–2018	Adidas	Grosvenor Casinos	None	Pro Evolution Soccer	GameTime Hydration
2018–2019	Adidas	Dafabet	ICM.com	None	None
2019–2020	Adidas	Dafabet	None	Skilling	RingCentral
2020–2021	Adidas	BetVictor	ClearScore	None	None
2021–2022	Adidas	World Mobile	None	Spreadex Trading	None
2022–2023	Adidas	W88	World Mobile	None	None
2023–2024	Adidas	SBOBET	WebBeds	None	None
2024–2025	Adidas	SBOBET	WebBeds	Go MonGOlia (in FA Cup matches)	None
2025–2026	Adidas	SBOBET	HiBob	Go MonGOlia (in FA Cup matches)	None
2026–2027	Adidas	ClickHouse	HiBob	Go MonGOlia (in FA Cup matches)	None

=== Mascot ===
The Fulham mascot is Billy the Badger, who was the winning design sent in by Kyle Jackson after an online competition by the club. Billy the Badger wears the number 79 Fulham shirt, in reference to the club's year of founding, 1879. Controversy first surrounded Billy when he tried to cheer up Chelsea manager Avram Grant during a home match in front of the television cameras. Secondly, Billy was seen on television being sent off during the home game against Aston Villa on 3 February 2008 for break-dancing in the corner of the pitch after the referee had commenced the game. Billy blamed his badger hearing and eyesight for the incident, and apologised to referee Chris Foy. On 11 March 2009, Billy walked across the goal during a match although it was not spotted by the referee. The former mascot for Fulham was Sir Craven of Cottage, the Knight. The cheerleaders were known as the Cravenettes.

== Rivalries and supporters ==
Fulham fans consider their main rivals to be Chelsea. Despite this fixture not being played that often in the years preceding Fulham's ascent to the top division, this is a clear local derby as Chelsea's ground, Stamford Bridge, is within Fulham and only 1.8 miles from Craven Cottage.

Fulham consider their secondary rivals to be Queens Park Rangers. Fulham beat QPR twice in the 2011–12 Premier League season. They won 6–0 at Craven Cottage, and also 1–0 away from home at Loftus Road. The two clubs have played each other several times since in the Championship.

Fulham's third closest rivalry is with Brentford, who they defeated 2–1 on 4 August 2020 in the Championship play-off final. Fulham also have rivalries with several other London clubs to a lesser extent, such as Crystal Palace.

Outside of London, Gillingham are still considered rivals to some Fulham supporters despite the two clubs not having played in the same division since the 2000–01 season. Fulham and Gillingham were involved in several ill-tempered matches in the lower leagues, including the death of a Fulham supporter.

The fans' all time best FFC Premier League XI

Fulham's fan base has fluctuated over the years, with high crowds coinciding with the club's success in the Premier League. Fulham supporters have played a vital role in the club's long term stay at Craven Cottage. When the club moved temporarily to Loftus Road, a committee known as Back to the Cottage was formed, committed to ensuring the club continued to play at their traditional home. Fulham fans have traditionally come from the Fulham and Hammersmith areas, and also from other areas in South-West London, such as Putney, Richmond, Sutton and Worcester Park.

In July 2012, the club website asked supporters using Facebook and Twitter to pick their best FFC Premier League XI from 2001 to the present. The supporters picked their favourite goalkeeper, full-backs, centre-backs, wingers, centre midfielders and forwards in a classic 4–4–2 formation. In August 2022, the club asked fans for an updated all time Premier League XI as part of the Premier League's 30th anniversary celebrations.

== Records and statistics ==
=== Fulham in Europe ===
Fulham are a member of the European Club Association, having qualified four times for European Competition, firstly the UEFA Intertoto Cup after their inaugural season in the Premier League, then the UEFA Cup as a result of winning that, and then the UEFA Europa League twice. Fulham are unbeaten at home in European competition, in 23 games, with a record of 17 wins and six draws. In 2010, Fulham reached the UEFA Europa League final, which they lost 2–1 to Atlético Madrid.

== Players ==
=== Current squad ===
As of 2 September 2026

Note: Flags indicate national team as defined under FIFA eligibility rules; some limited exceptions apply. Players may hold more than one non-FIFA nationality.

No.	Pos.	Nation	Player
1	GK	GER	Bernd Leno
2	DF	NED	Kenny Tete
3	DF	NGR	Calvin Bassey
4	DF	ESP	Jorge Cuenca
5	DF	DEN	Joachim Andersen
6	MF	ENG	Harrison Reed
7	FW	ESP	Gonzalo García
8	MF	ESP	César Palacios
9	FW	BRA	Rodrigo Muniz
10	MF	SCO	Tom Cairney (captain)
11	FW	BRA	Kevin
14	FW	NOR	Oscar Bobb
15	MF	SWE	Hugo Larsson (on loan from Eintracht Frankfurt)

No.	Pos.	Nation	Player
16	MF	NOR	Sander Berge
17	MF	NGR	Alex Iwobi
18	FW	SWE	Jonah Kusi-Asare
19	MF	NIR	Shea Charles
20	MF	ESP	Manuel Ángel
21	DF	BEL	Timothy Castagne
22	DF	AUT	David Affengruber
23	GK	FRA	Benjamin Lecomte
24	MF	ENG	Josh King
30	MF	ENG	Ryan Sessegnon
32	MF	ENG	Emile Smith Rowe
33	DF	USA	Antonee Robinson
36	GK	USA	Alex Borto

=== Out on loan ===
As of 25 August 2026

Note: Flags indicate national team as defined under FIFA eligibility rules; some limited exceptions apply. Players may hold more than one non-FIFA nationality.

No.	Pos.	Nation	Player
—	GK	ENG	Alfie McNally (on loan at York City)
—	DF	CAN	Luc de Fougerolles (on loan at Real Salt Lake)

No.	Pos.	Nation	Player
—	MF	WAL	Luke Harris (on loan at Wigan Athletic)
—	FW	ENG	Aaron Loupalo-Bi (on loan at Fleetwood Town)

=== Academy ===
Fulham's Academy combines academic education with athletic development, supporting players in pursuing qualifications such as BTECs and A-Levels alongside football training. Coaches and educators coordinate to tailor schedules that balance school commitments with on-pitch requirements.

The Fulham FC Foundation's Player Pathway programme provides players who have previous knowledge and experience of the game (U7–U16) with structured coaching delivered by FA-qualified and UEFA-qualified staff. Training follows a four-corner model, developing physical, technical/tactical, psychological, and social skills. Sessions promote creativity, player autonomy, and regular participation during school terms.

Since 2022, the Academy has used performance-tracking technology from Israeli sports tech company Playermaker. The system's footwear-mounted sensors collect technical and physical performance data, supporting training design, performance analysis, and inclusivity initiatives across youth squads.

== Club staff ==
Position	Name
Chairman	Shahid Khan
Chief executive officer	Alistair Mackintosh
Finance director	Sean O'Loughlin
Non-executive director	Mark Lamping

Position	Name
Head coach	Álvaro Arbeloa
Assistant head coach	Julián Carmon
First team coach	Ali Melloul
Lead goalkeeping coach	Borja Fernandez Freiria
Goalkeeping coach	Geoff Warne
Head of analysis	Francis Sanchez
Head of performance	Ricardo da Silva
Head of strength and conditioning	Alex Salvador
Head of player development	Kevin Cardeiro
First team development coach	Colin Omogbehin
Under-23s head coach	Steve Wigley

=== Managerial history ===
Fulham have had 38 managers in 122 years. Prior to the appointment of the first manager at the club (Bradshaw in 1904), the duties normally assigned to a modern-day manager would have been shared between club secretary, captain, and other officials.

Name	From	To
Harry Bradshaw	1904	1909
Phil Kelso	1909	1924
Andy Ducat	1924	1926
Joe Bradshaw	1926	1929
Ned Liddell	1929	1931
Jimmy McIntyre	1931	1934
Jimmy Hogan	1934	1935
Jack Peart	1935	1948
Frank Osborne*	1948	1949
Bill Dodgin Sr.	1949	1953
Frank Osborne*	1953	1956
Doug Livingstone	1956	1958
Bedford Jezzard	1958	1964
Vic Buckingham	1965	1968
Bobby Robson	1968	1968
Bill Dodgin Jr.	1969	1972
Alec Stock	1972	1976
Bobby Campbell	1976	1980
Malcolm Macdonald	1980	1984
Ray Harford	1984	1986
Ray Lewington	1986	1990
Alan Dicks	1990	1991
Don Mackay	1991	1994
Ian Branfoot**	1994	1996
Micky Adams	1996	1997
Ray Wilkins	1997	1998
Kevin Keegan^{†}	1998	1999
Paul Bracewell	1999	2000
Jean Tigana	2000	2003
Chris Coleman	2003	2007
Lawrie Sanchez	2007	2007
Roy Hodgson	2007	2010
Mark Hughes	2010	2011
Martin Jol	2011	2013
René Meulensteen^{§±}	2013	2014
Felix Magath	2014	2014
Kit Symons	2014	2015
Slaviša Jokanović^{±}	2015	2018
Claudio Ranieri	2018	2019
Scott Parker^{±}	2019	2021
Marco Silva^{±}	2021	2026
Álvaro Arbeloa^{±}	2026	Present

- * Frank Osborne was employed continuously by the club from 1948 to 1963, but only spent the above periods as designated manager.
- ** Ian Branfoot continued to be employed by the club after his dismissal as manager.
- ^{†} Kevin Keegan was employed by the club as chief operating officer (during which time he essentially acted as an assistant manager) during the time of his predecessor (Ray Wilkins) being the actual manager.
- ^{§} René Meulensteen was appointed as head coach under previous manager Martin Jol (during which time he essentially acted as an assistant manager), but never took on the title of "manager" after Jol's departure, despite assuming the duties usually assigned to one. He remained as head coach for four days after Magath's appointment before being released.
- ^{±} Some managers have only had the official description of "head coach" rather than "manager": René Meulensteen, Slaviša Jokanović, Scott Parker, Marco Silva and Álvaro Arbeloa as well as interim head coach Peter Grant.

Managerial records:

- Only one man has managed the club through two different spells, Frank Osborne, in 1948–49 and then 1953–56.
- The longest spell as Fulham manager was by Phil Kelso, 15 years (1909–1924)
- Several managers have failed to last more than a year at the club: Bobby Robson, Ray Wilkins, Paul Bracewell, Lawrie Sanchez, Mark Hughes, René Meulensteen, Felix Magath, and Claudio Ranieri. Further to this, Frank Osborne only had a year after his initial arrival at the club during which he was principally in charge of the team (before Dodgin, senior) arrived, although he later took sole charge of the club for an extended period.

Temporary managers at the club have included:

- Johnny Haynes: Took over after Bobby Robson was dismissed in 1968 for only a handful of matches. The Maestro was offered the role permanently but had no inclination to become a manager.
- Karl-Heinz Riedle: when Paul Bracewell was dismissed halfway through the 1999–2000 season, there was a temporary period of Fulham being managed by their striker Karl-Heinz Riedle, assisted his old boss at Liverpool, Roy Evans. Riedle injured a lung in the season's penultimate game.
- Chris Coleman: after Tigana resigned four months before planned in 2003, Chris Coleman was appointed as caretaker manager, much to the delight of the fans. Having initially denied he wanted the post, Coleman accepted the role of full-time manager that summer.
- Lawrie Sanchez: when Coleman was dismissed, Sanchez came in to take control of the club for the remaining five games of the season. (See above)
- Ray Lewington: took temporary charge of Fulham for three games following Lawrie Sanchez's dismissal in December 2007. Lewington also took temporary charge of the club in July 2010 after Roy Hodgson had left the club until the appointment of Mark Hughes.
- Kit Symons: temporarily took charge of Fulham after Felix Magath's dismissal in September 2014 before being appointed on 29 October.
- Peter Grant: took charge of Fulham for three games after Kit Symons' dismissal.
- Stuart Gray: succeeded Grant as temporary manager (holding down the job title of "senior coach") after poor results in Grant's three games in charge whilst the board looked for a permanent successor to Kit Symons.
- Scott Parker: took over as caretaker after Claudio Ranieri left the club on 28 February 2019 until he was permanently appointed on 10 May 2019.

=== Ownership ===
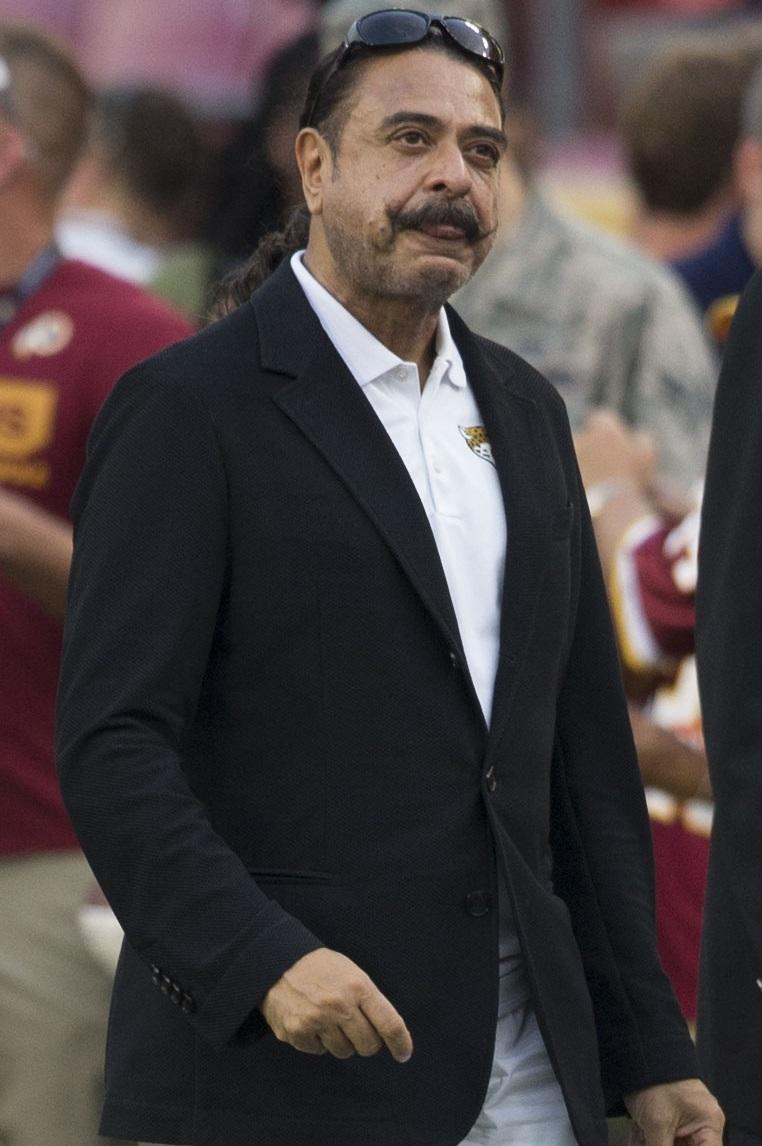
Shahid Khan, owner and chairman

Fulham Football Club is owned by Shahid Khan. Khan completed his purchase of the club from Mohamed Al-Fayed on 12 July 2013 for a reported £150–200 million.

During his ownership of Fulham, Al-Fayed had provided the club with £187 million in interest-free loans. In March 2011, Fulham posted annual losses of £16.9 million, with Al-Fayed stating that he would "continue to make funds available to achieve our goals both on and off the pitch" and that "the continued success of Fulham and its eventual financial self-sustainability is my priority." As of January 2013, Fulham were effectively debt-free as Al-Fayed converted the loans into equity in the club.

== Honours ==
League

- Second Division / First Division / Championship (level 2)
  - Champions: 1948–49, 2000–01, 2021–22
  - Runners-up: 1958–59
  - Play-off winners: 2018, 2020
- Third Division South / Third Division / Second Division (level 3)
  - Champions: 1931–32, 1998–99
  - Runners-up: 1970–71
  - Promoted: 1981–82
- Third Division (level 4)
  - Runners-up: 1996–97

Cup

- FA Cup
  - Runners-up: 1974–75
- UEFA Europa League
  - Runners-up: 2009–10
- UEFA Intertoto Cup
  - Winners: 2002

Minor titles

- Southern League First Division
  - Champions: 1905–06, 1906–07
- Southern League Second Division
  - Champions: 1901–02, 1902–03
- Western League Division One Section A
  - Champions: 1906–07
- West London League
  - Champions: 1892–93
- London Challenge Cup
  - Winners: 1909–10, 1931–32, 1951–52
- West London Cup
  - Winners: 1886–87, 1890–91 1892–93
- London Fives Tournament
  - Winners: 1955, 1957, 1982
