= Len Oliver (footballer) =

English footballer

Personal information
- Full name: Leonard Frederick Oliver
- Date of birth: 1 August 1905
- Place of birth: Fulham, England
- Date of death: 1967 (aged 61–62)
- Position: Right half

Senior career*
Years	Team	Apps	(Gls)
- Fulham

International career
1929	England	1	(0)
- * Club domestic league appearances and goals

Leonard Frederick Oliver (1 August 1905 – 1967) was an English international footballer, who played as a right half.

== Career ==
Born in Fulham, Oliver played professionally for Fulham, and earned one cap for England in 1929.
