= West London League =

Association football competition in West London

The West London League was an association football competition featuring teams located in and around West London. It was formed in 1892, and featured only amateur teams.

== History ==
The league was formed in 1892, with its original members being Fulham, Queen's Park Rangers, Stanley, Paddington, Southall, Grove House, Kildare, and St. John's College.

== Champions ==
- 1892–93 – Fulham
- 1895–96 – Stanley FC
- 1900–1901 – Staines Town
- 1931–1932 – Lighthouse Football Club
