= Xóc đĩa =

Vietnamese gambling game

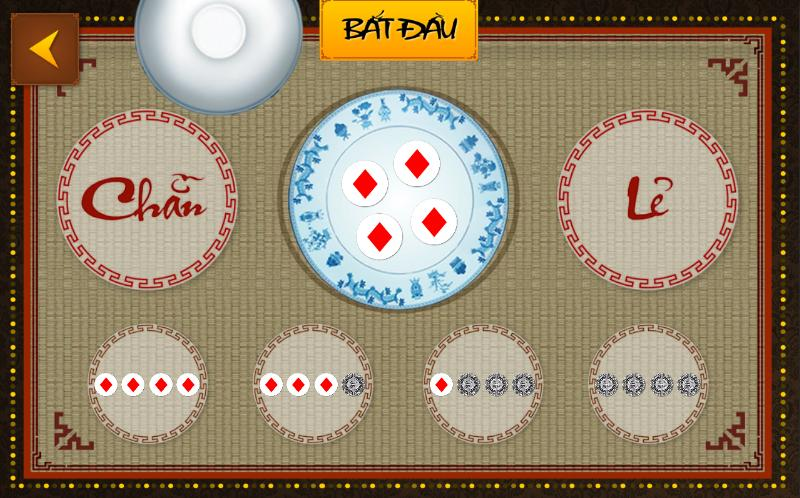
An online xóc đĩa

Xóc đĩa (Chữ Nôm: 觸碟) is a gambling game, originated in northern Vietnam. The game probably originated around 1909. This game is considered illegal by the governmental authorities because it's thought to be linked with criminal activities and gambling is defined as an illegal act in the Vietnamese Criminal Code.

== Playing ==
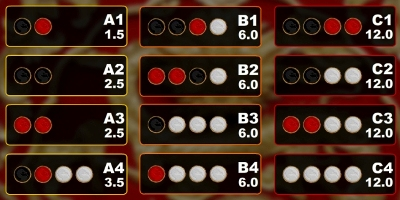
Combination chart

It is played with 4 coin shaped tokens in 3 different colors.

Combination	Possibility
black black red red	1/16
black black grey grey	1/16
red red grey grey	1/16
grey grey grey grey	1/16
black black red grey	2/16
red red black grey	2/16
black grey grey grey	2/16
red grey grey grey	2/16
black red grey grey	4/16
