= NET88 =

Online gambling company

- Industry: Gambling
- Founded: 2015
- Products: Sports betting, online casino

NET88 is a Vietnamese betting firm founded in 2015.

== History ==
NET88 was founded in 2015. The UK trademark was filed on 13 March 2024. In 2024, NET88 became the sponsor of Premier League club Crystal Palace for a two-year deal, replacing previous sponsor Cinch. NET88 had little online presence before the deal, and did not have a Twitter account until June 2024.

== Sponsorship and media coverage ==
In June 2024, NET88 was announced as the new front-of-shirt sponsor for Crystal Palace Football Club in a multi-year partnership deal. The club officially announced the partnership on their social media platforms and website on June 13, 2024.

According to SportsPro, the deal was reported to be worth approximately £10 million per season, representing a significant increase from the club's previous sponsorship arrangements. The Athletic reported that the partnership came as Premier League clubs were facing a deadline to secure new front-of-shirt sponsors following regulatory changes in the gambling sector.

Following the announcement, some media outlets noted that public records showed trademarks for NET88 and Wolverhampton Wanderers' sponsor DEBET had been filed on the same day, leading to discussions about potential connections between the entities and cast doubt on the identity of the company's founder.
