= HiBob =

Israel-British human resources platform

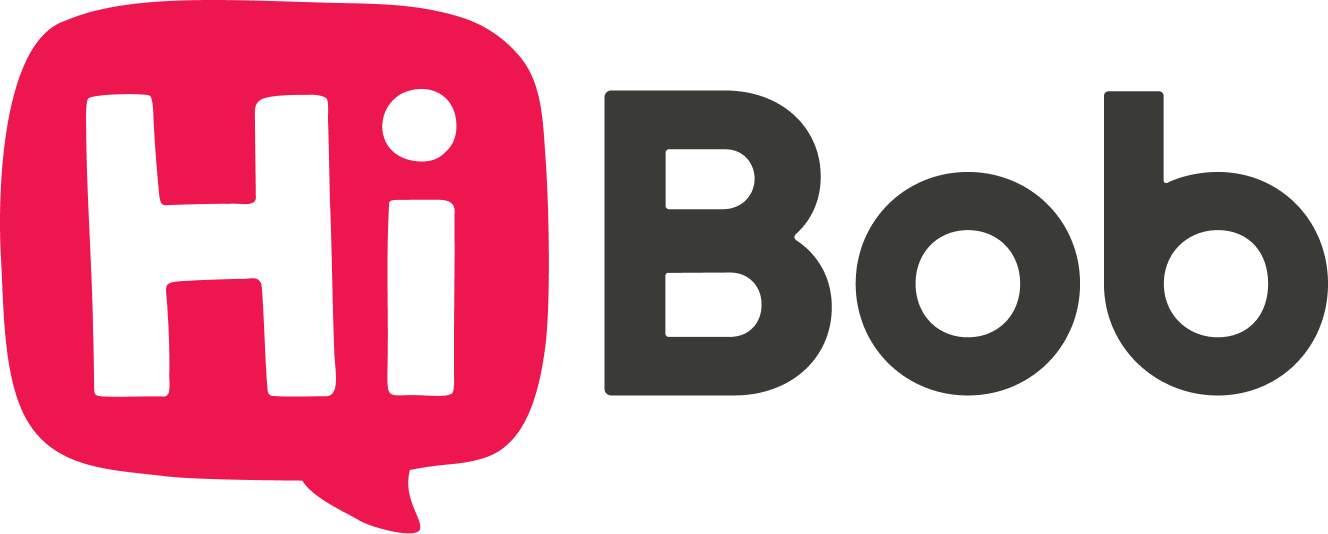
- Type: Private
- Industry: Software
- Founded: 2015; 11 years ago in Tel Aviv, Israel
- Founders: Amit Knaani; Ronni Zehavi; Israel David; Andy Bellass
- Headquarters: London, United Kingdom
- Area served: Worldwide
- Products: Bob
- Services: HCM software; HRIS platform; Core HR tools
- Website: hibob.com

HiBob is a human resources software company that develops Bob, a cloud-based human capital management platform. The company was founded in Tel Aviv in 2015 by Amit Knaani, Ronni Zehavi, Israel David, and Andy Bellass, and is headquartered in London. HiBob has raised several rounds of venture funding, including a US$150 million Series C in 2021 and a US$150 million funding round in 2023 that valued the company at nearly US$2.7 billion.The company expanded its platform through the acquisitions of payroll automation company Pento in 2024 and financial planning and analysis platform Mosaic in 2025.

== History ==
HiBob was founded in 2015 in Tel Aviv by Amit Knaani, Ronni Zehavi, Israel David, and Andy Bellass to develop human resources software intended for internationally distributed workforces. Early funding came from U.S.-based venture capital firms.

In 2016, HiBob launched its platform in the United Kingdom. A year later, in 2017, it received $17.5 million in a Series A funding round. In 2019, it received additional funding of $20 million.

In 2020, HiBob raised $70 million in Series B funding; by late 2020 it had raised approximately US$124 million in venture capital funding. Following this round, the company expanded hiring in the United States.

HiBob then raised US$150 million in Series C funding in October 2021, followed by another US$150 million Series D round in August 2022. The rounds valued the company at US$1.65 billion and US$2.45 billion, respectively. Another US$150 million funding round occurred in September 2023, led by Farallon Capital and Alpha Wave Global, raising HiBob's valuation to nearly US$2.7 billion and bringing total funding to approximately US$574 million.

In 2021, HiBob acquired Cassiopeia and subsequently integrated its anonymous reporting tool, Your Voice, into the HiBob platform. In 2022, the company acquired Bugle, a Lisbon-based company, and established a research and development center in Portugal.

In November 2022, Time selected HiBob for its annual "200 Best Inventions" list. HiBob also appeared on Forbes' Cloud 100 in both 2023 and 2024.

In 2024, HiBob acquired Tiger Global-backed Pento, a payroll automation platform based in London. In 2025, the company acquired Mosaic, a U.S.-based financial planning and analysis software company that utilizes artificial intelligence in financial management.

== Platform ==
Bob is HiBob’s cloud-based HCM and HRIS platform delivered as software-as-a-service. It is aimed at mid-market employers and used to manage multiple human resources functions. Bob supports core HR administration, workforce management, talent and engagement processes, compensation, analytics, payroll, benefits administration, automation, and integrations.

The platform also includes tools for hybrid-work scheduling and geographically distributed teams. Following HiBob’s acquisition of Pento, Bob expanded its payroll automation capabilities. The acquisition of Mosaic added financial-planning functionality, including tools for connecting HR data with budget modeling and workforce cost planning.

AI-assisted reporting, including natural-language report generation was later integrated into the platform.
