= 2021 takeover of Newcastle United F.C. =

Takeover of football club led by Public Investment Fund

The Public Investment Fund of Saudi Arabia purchased an 80% stake in Newcastle United

The 2021 takeover of Newcastle United F.C. by a consortium of the Saudi Public Investment Fund (PIF), PCP Capital Partners, and the Reuben Brothers was a takeover proceeding that commenced in April 2020 and was successfully concluded in October 2021.

The takeover process gained notoriety for allegations of improper conduct against the Premier League through a purported deliberate misapplication of its Owners' and Directors' test to block the deal, following allegations of undue influence from the Qatari-owned beIN Sports (with whom Saudi Arabia have strained bilateral relations) and rival clubs to Newcastle United. Wider debates ensued regarding fan privacy, impact on the Premier League and UK-Saudi Arabia relations, and perceived sportswashing. After interventions from then-Prime Minister of the United Kingdom, Boris Johnson, and the governments of Saudi Arabia and Qatar, the takeover process lasted for 18 months, and was completed in October 2021.

Supporters of the takeover cited a lack of uproar over other, similar takeovers, while most Newcastle United fans argued the takeover would enable greater investment in the Tyneside region, which has seen historic underdevelopment. Other supporters of the takeover pointed to the potential of strengthening the diplomatic ties between the UK and Saudi Arabia, likely increased emphasis by Saudi Arabia on their grassroots football, and reduction in Islamophobia in the UK.

== April 2020 to July 2020: Initial Owners' and Directors' Test ==
On 14 April 2020, it emerged that a request to undertake the Premier League's Owners' and Directors' Test had been filed by a consortium consisting of PCP Capital Partners, Reuben Brothers and the Public Investment Fund of Saudi Arabia (PIF), as the final stage of their £300m bid to purchase ownership of Newcastle United from Mike Ashley. A final decision on the outcome of the test was to be delivered by the Premier League board, populated by Gary Hoffman (chairman), Richard Masters (chief executive) and Kevin Beeston (non-executive director).

The bid drew opposition from various third parties. One such party was Qatar's state-owned media group beIN, the rights holder for broadcasting Premier League matches in the MENA region, which is the league's highest value overseas contract and was due to be renewed in December 2020. beIN had been caught up in a geopolitical dispute between Qatar and Saudi Arabia over Qatar's alleged sponsoring of terrorism, whereby beIN had been banned by the Saudi government from broadcasting in Saudi Arabia since mid-2017. Furthermore, a WTO report released in 2020 had accused the Saudi Arabian government of not previously doing enough to prevent the illegal streaming of beIN Sport's broadcasts in Saudi Arabia through illegal service beoutQ; beoutQ was shut down in August 2019 but had caused significant financial damage to beIN.

Consequently, in April 2020 Yousef Al-Obaidly – CEO of beIN – wrote to the Premier League and all of its member clubs demanding that the prospective takeover of Newcastle United be blocked. He also attached a letter from beIN Sport's legal adviser, Stephan Nathan QC, saying that the KSA government had supported beoutQ and that the government would become a shadow director of Newcastle if the takeover was approved.

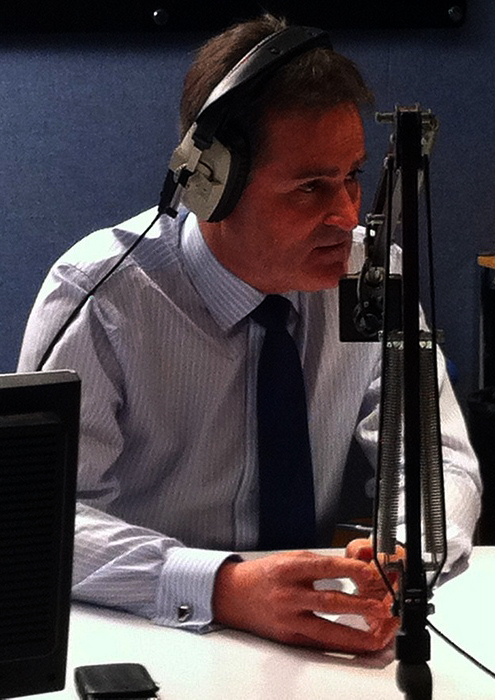
Richard Keys, lead presenter at beIN Sports, regularly spoke out against the prospective takeover

beIN also commenced an intense public lobbying campaign through the broadcasting of regular briefs against the takeover on their channels. One example of this was on beIN Sport's Keys and Gray show, where lead presenter Richard Keys said that his "very good friend" Gary Hoffman (chairman of the Premier League) had to "tread carefully" around the fact that "we at beIN Sports have spent the last two years fighting Saudi Arabia, who have been broadcasting our sports rights illegally (through) a company called beoutQ".

beIN's legal advice to the Premier League was contradicted by the Saudi Arabian government, who asserted that their outlawing of beoutQ alongside the SAIP's subsequent clampdown on piracy was proof that they were robustly tackling the piracy issue. They also advised that PIF was a separate legal entity to the government. In June 2020 however, the Saudi Arabian Football Federation wrote to various major sports bodies across world football to acknowledge that it had a "responsibility" to continue fighting broadcasting piracy.

On 21 April 2020, Amnesty International voiced their opposition to the takeover attempt, saying that it was part of Saudi Arabia's efforts to "sportswash" their poor human rights record alongside their other recent significant investments in international sports. In June 2020 however, The Guardian reported that the fact the UK government had recently advised human rights groups that "there are grounds for cautious optimism regarding social reform and modernisation in the (Saudi) kingdom" was positive news for the takeover. Similarly, the Premier League's Owners' and Directors' test does not provide parameters for rejecting takeovers on moral grounds.

In July 2020, it was retrospectively claimed by the buying consortium that future member clubs of the failed European Super League and Project Big Picture (where a handful of elite clubs attempted to gain increased control over matters including finances and the approval of takeovers) such as Liverpool and Tottenham, had strongly lobbied the Premier League to block the takeover.

It was widely anticipated that it would take around four weeks for the Premier League to deliver a decision on the test, owing to the record of previous tests. However, on 14 July 2020, a senior employee at Newcastle United told The Athletic that the ongoing delay to the Premier League's making a decision was causing uncertainty for the club and consequently substantial damage to Newcastle United's long-term planning. When asked for an update at various intervals by members of the media and MPs, Richard Masters – Chief Executive of the Premier League – refused to give any comment or time-frame for the ongoing process.

On 30 July 2020 the consortium pulled out of the buying process, citing the prolonged delay for a decision from the Premier League alongside the league's refusal to communicate a time-frame for it, as causing their acquisition of Newcastle United to become untenable, particularly given their contract of sale with seller Mike Ashley had lapsed. The buyers also claimed that the geopolitical interference from Qatar, as well as from influential Premier League clubs, had caused the Premier League to purposely avoid either approving the deal or issuing an improper rejection that could be appealed.

== August 2020 to September 2021: Fans' demand for transparency, legal challenges ==
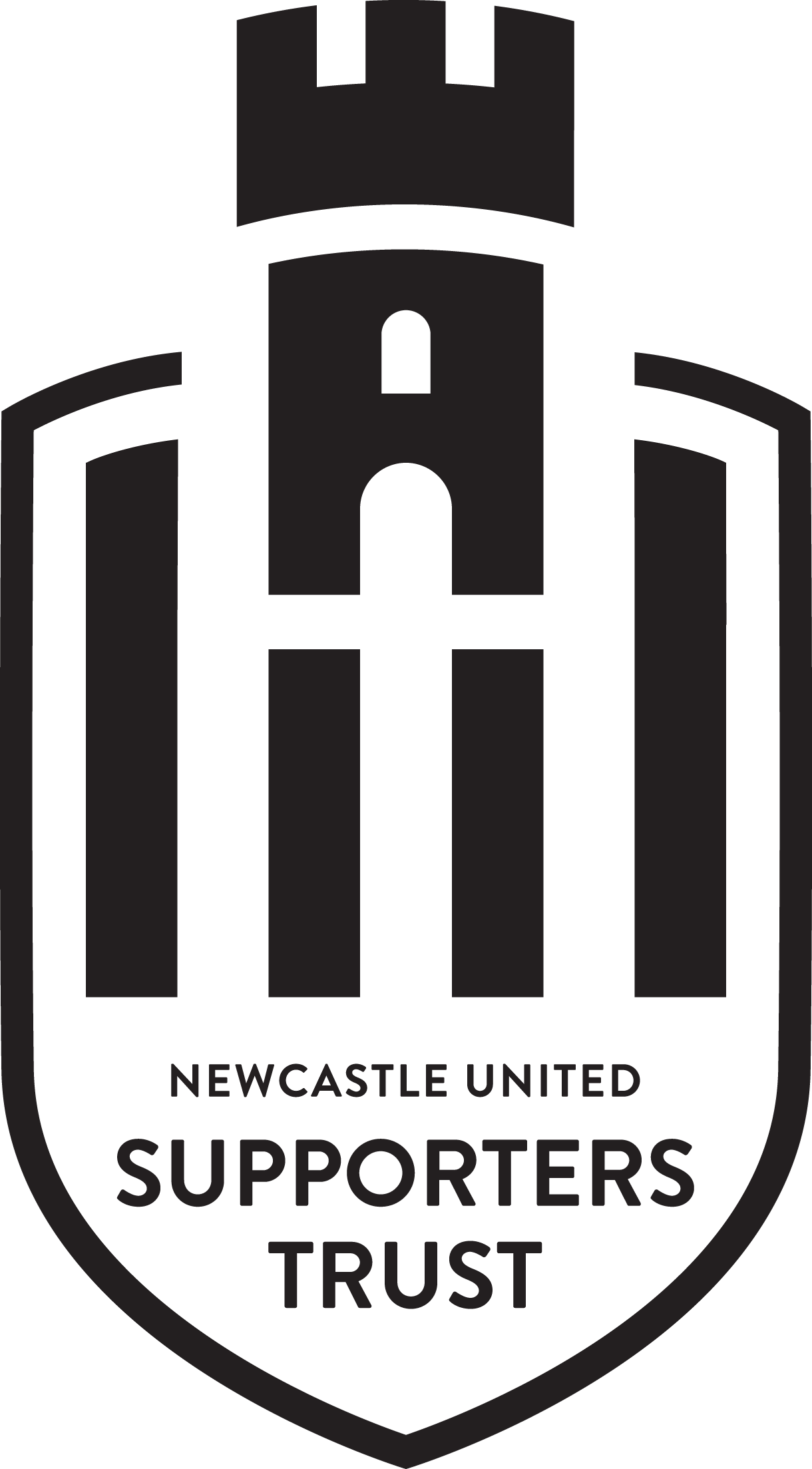
97% of NUST members supported the takeover, due to the prospective investment in their club and wider region

After the buyers pulled out, Newcastle United fans reacted with outrage, with 97% of the Newcastle United Supporters Trust (NUST) having been in favour of the takeover owing to the consortium's plans to invest heavily in to the club and surrounding communities. Newcastle United fans started a petition, calling for a government investigation into the Premier League's conduct due to the league's perceived lack of transparency and integrity; it gained more than 110,000 signatures. In addition, over eighty MPs and the Independent Football Ombudsman (IFO) wrote to Richard Masters demanding transparency on the process of Newcastle United's subjection to the Owners' and Directors' test. The Prime Minister of the United Kingdom, Boris Johnson, further urged Masters and the Premier League that "there must be clarity on why there was a significant delay in a decision being made".

On 14 August 2020, Richard Masters issued his first public statement on Newcastle United's taking of the Premier League's Owners' and Directors' test, stating in a reply to MP Chi Onwurah that the Premier League had deemed there to be insufficient legal separation between the Public Investment Fund of Saudi Arabia (PIF) and the Saudi Arabian government, and so the government would become a shadow director if the takeover were approved. He also asserted that the consortium had declined the Premier League's offer of independent arbitration on the matter. Furthermore, Masters emphasised that the test was conducted objectively and independently by the Premier League board, and denied any claims of third-party influence over the process. The consortium responded that arbitration would already be available to them after the Premier League had delivered its overall decision and that undergoing arbitration before the Premier League's overall decision was a highly irregular procedure. They also claimed that the Premier League's desire to undertake an arbitration process – which had taken over a year to complete in previous instances – for one individual aspect of the Owners' and Directors' Test was demonstrative of the Premier League's attempts to delay their delivery of a final decision.

On 9 September 2020, Newcastle United released a statement which apparently confirmed that the Premier League had finally officially rejected the buying consortium's proposed takeover of Newcastle United through the consortium's failing of the Premier League's Owners' and Directors' Test. Furthermore, the club's statement advised that "this conclusion has been reached despite the club providing the Premier League with overwhelming evidence and legal opinions that PIF is independent and autonomous of the Saudi Arabian government. The club and its owners do not accept that Premier League chief executive Richard Masters and the Premier League have acted appropriately in relation to this matter and will be considering all relevant options available to them." However, on 10 September 2020, the Premier League responded with a statement which defended the actions of Masters and the Premier League, and advised that "the club's assertion that the Premier League has rejected the takeover is incorrect". According to various media reports, these statements were the result of shuttle diplomacy conducted by elements of the UK government between the buying consortium and Richard Masters, which continued informal communications even after the official withdrawal of the buying consortium's bid. During these informal communications, the offer of further concessions from the buying consortium had been rejected by Richard Masters and the Premier League.

Newcastle United subsequently launched two separate legal actions against the Premier League in an attempt to push through the takeover. Firstly, on 14 September 2020 Blackstone Chambers announced that they had appointed Nick De Marco QC and Shaheed Fatima QC to represent Newcastle United in the club's legal arbitration action against the Premier League's determination that the Saudi Arabian government and PIF were not separate entities. The legal arbitration hearing was scheduled to take place in July 2021. An additional claim was filed with the UK Competition Appeal Tribunal (CAT) on 22 April 2021, where St James Holdings – the holding company of Newcastle United – asserted that the Premier League had acted anti-competitively and "prevented, or hindered, the proposed takeover and knew that its actions would prevent and/or delay the proposed takeover". The Competition Appeal Tribunal would later, on 27 July 2021, list the jurisdiction hearing for the case to take place on 29 September 2021, after the Premier League applied to have the case thrown out.

On 1 July 2021, Newcastle United released a statement calling for the Premier League to agree to their request to conduct the forthcoming takeover arbitration hearing – scheduled for later in July and by default a private event – in public and "finally accept public scrutiny of its decision-making process". On 4 July 2021, Mehrdad Ghodoussi of PCP Capital Partners accused the Premier League of "delay tactics" and "zero transparency", following multiple extensions of deadlines at the Premier League's request within both legal cases. On 6 July 2021, Amanda Staveley spoke out to add further support to Newcastle United's request for the Premier League to agree to a public takeover arbitration hearing. She also wrote a letter to Oliver Dowden MP, the then UK Secretary of State for Digital, Culture, Media and Sport, urging the government to intervene and enforce transparency:

Fans surely deserve absolute transparency from the regulators across all their processes – to best ensure that they act responsibly. They [the Premier League] are performing a function like that of a government regulator – but without the same systems for accountability.

On 16 July 2021, around 300 Newcastle United fans travelled to London to protest outside Downing Street and the Premier League's headquarters to demand a public takeover arbitration hearing.

Initially, the Premier League repeatedly declined to comment on these requests for transparency and similarly rejected the proposition of a public arbitration hearing. Later however, on 20 August 2021 Richard Masters advised that the Premier League's "arbitration proceedings are always confidential" and that "Newcastle United FC, along with all other member Clubs, agreed to these procedural rules for arbitration".

On 19 July 2021, it was announced that the takeover arbitration hearing had been postponed to "early 2022". In response, Mehrdad Ghodoussi accused the Premier League of further "playing games". The new date was later defined by a QC representing the Premier League as being 3 January 2022 and that the hearing would last "little more than a week".

On 22 July 2021, Tracey Crouch MP – chair of the fan-led review into the UK's football governance, which had taken extensive evidence from fans including meeting with the NUST – announced the review's interim findings. In them, it was stated that football authorities had "lost the trust and confidence" of fans, and it was recommended that a new independent regulator be created to oversee matters such as club takeovers. These findings were backed by Oliver Dowden MP (then Secretary of the DCMS), who added that "the Premier League had its fit and proper persons test (for the Newcastle United takeover) and they're going through that. I want them to get on with it. They need to do it quickly and transparently. They should have done it quicker."

On 29 September 2021, the jurisdiction hearing for the CAT case took place. Attendees at the virtual hearing were Daniel Jowell QC representing St James Holdings, Nick De Marco QC representing Newcastle United, Adam Lewis QC representing the Premier League, as well as the three members of the tribunal panel led by Mr Justice Miles. The majority of the hearing was publicly livestreamed through the CAT's website, with approximately 33,000 people from over 50 countries watching the proceedings. However, the Premier League insisted that certain segments of the hearing take place in private, as they said these segments contained information related to the concurrently running and confidential arbitration case. Key arguments that were debated during the hearing included:

- The similarities and differences between the arbitration case and the CAT case
- Whether St James Holdings was bound by Premier League rules to conduct all disputes through the league's own private arbitration mechanism
- Whether tangible loss had yet been suffered by St James Holdings

Daniel Jowell QC also alleged that the Premier League "abused its position" by blocking the takeover after it was "improperly influenced" by rival Premier League clubs and beIN Sports. Furthermore, he said that the Premier League had threatened to expel Newcastle United from the league. Mr Justice Miles concluded proceedings by advising all parties that a decision on whether the CAT case was to proceed would be reached and communicated to them after the tribunal panel "going away and considering with care" all of the evidence submitted.

== October 2021: completion of takeover ==
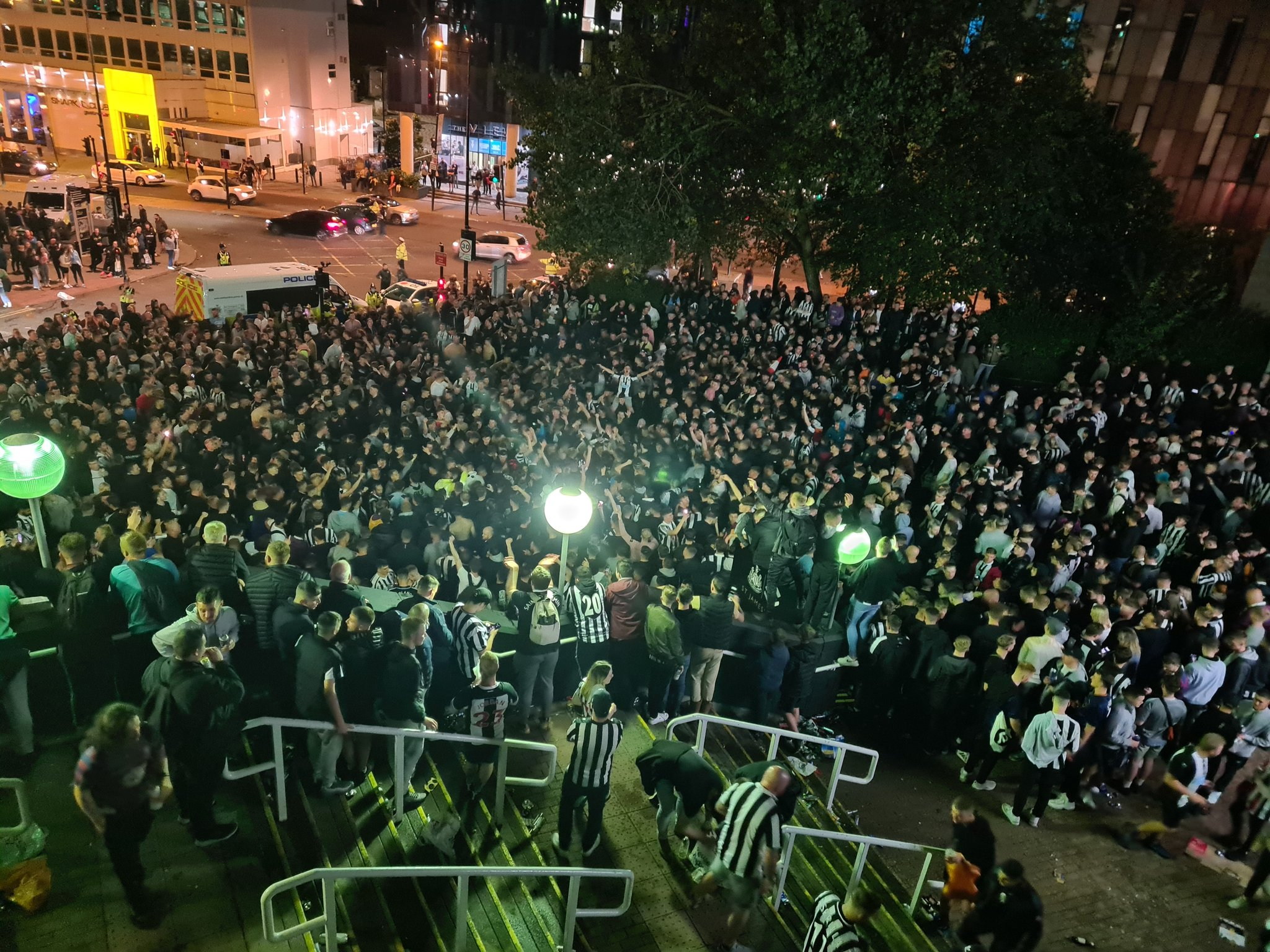
Image from Newcastle Fans TV, showing thousands of fans celebrating the completed takeover outside St James' Park on 7 October 2021

On 6 October 2021, news emerged that Saudi Arabia had lifted their ban on the broadcasting of beIN Sports in their country. This was said to have been a key issue behind the Premier League's blocking of the takeover and it was soon widely reported that a compromise had been reached between the Premier League, Newcastle United and the buying consortium for the takeover to go through.

On 7 October 2021, the takeover of Newcastle United was officially confirmed, with the Public Investment Fund taking a majority 80% stake in the club, whilst PCP Capital Partners and Reuben Brothers each took 10%. In a statement, the Premier League said that they had "now received legally binding assurances that the Kingdom of Saudi Arabia will not control Newcastle United Football Club". In a concurrent statement, Yasir Al-Rumayyan – the Governor of PIF and the new Non-Executive Director of Newcastle United – said:

We are extremely proud to become the new owners of Newcastle United, one of the most famous clubs in English football. We thank the Newcastle fans for their tremendously loyal support over the years and we are excited to work together with them.

The takeover led to widespread speculation that manager Steve Bruce was expected to leave the club. Staveley stated Bruce was to remain for the new owners first game against Tottenham Hotspur, his 1000th match as a football manager; however, he left the club by mutual consent the following week.

Eddie Howe was appointed as the consortium's debut managerial signing on 8 November 2021.

Lee Charnley, who acted as managing director under Ashley's ownership, left the club on 19 November 2021 following a six-week handover period. His departure was the final of Mike Ashley's hierarchy, with Staveley stating the club was undergoing a "formal process" to appoint a new figure to replace the role.

Following the takeover of the club, the consortium would remove the Sports Direct sponsorship all over the stadium with Staveley claiming she was "looking forward" to remove the Sports Direct branding to get new sponsors with the sponsor being removed on 6 December, which led to former owner Mike Ashley taking legal action against Staveley and her husband Mehrdad Ghodoussi after Ashley alleged that both Staveley and Ghodoussi breached their agreement to continue to sponsor St James' Park until the end of the 2021–2022 Premier League season.

In February 2022, Dan Ashworth was appointed as the consortium's technical director of football.

== Reaction ==
Newcastle United's Premier League rivals reacted with fury to the takeover's successful conclusion. On 12 October 2021, an emergency meeting was convened by the other 19 Premier League clubs between themselves and the Premier League, where they voiced their anger at the league's decision to ratify the takeover; Newcastle United were the only Premier League club to be excluded from attending the meeting. On 18 November 2021, Premier League clubs voted to tighten the Premier League's financial controls in order to limit Newcastle United's spending power. On 16 November 2021, Gary Hoffman resigned from his role as Premier League chairman with effect from the end of January 2022, after Newcastle's rivals held him responsible for the takeover's completion.

On 23 October 2021, at Newcastle United's first away game since the takeover, at Selhurst Park, home of Crystal Palace, a banner was displayed by Palace supporters targeting the takeover. It featured illustrations of a man dressed in traditional Arabian clothing, carrying a sword with dripping blood, next to Premier League chief executive Richard Masters. It also feature a checklist with alleged offences carried out by the Saudi Arabia regime. On a picture of a clipboard under the headline 'Premier League Owners Test' were listed the words 'Terrorism, beheading, civil rights abuses, murder, censorship and persecution'. Police assessed the banner and decided that no criminal offence had occurred.

On 17 November 2021, an online Fans Forum Survey conducted by "ChronicleLive and its sister websites" found that 84.4% of neutral football fans thought the completed takeover was good for the game, with 7.3% stating they thought it was bad whilst 8.3% said they were unsure.

In May 2022, Amnesty International criticised the new away kit of Newcastle United F.C., stating that it amounted to sportswashing by the club's Saudi Arabian owners. The kit's colours, which were white with a green trim, strongly resembled the colours of Saudi's national football team. Although the Premier League guaranteed that Saudi Arabia would not control Newcastle, the leaked images of the club's new kit suggested otherwise. Amnesty UK's head of campaigns, Felix Jakens said it was a "clear evidence of the regime using Newcastle to portray a positive image".

In March 2023 Amnesty further called for the United Kingdom to examine Newcastle's link to Saudi Arabia after a legal brief in a United States court case between the PGA Tour and the PIF funded LIV Golf tour that was issued by lawyers of the PIF and current Newcastle club chairman and PIF governor Yasir Al-Rumayyan; stated that the PIF was a "sovereign instrumentality" of Saudi Arabia and that Rumayyan was a current Saudi Arabian government minister.

== Aftermath ==
In April 2023, a report of UK government emails related to the takeover by The Athletic, stated that the United Kingdom government believed a potential failure of the takeover posed a risk to Saudi Arabia–United Kingdom relations and that a number of senior UK government officials actively promoted the takeover and had pressured the Premier League to allow it. The report also stated that the UK Department of International Trade had created a public relations offer to the Premier League in an apparent attempt to bolster the reputation of Saudi Arabia and that the PIF planned to make $30 billion of direct investment in the United Kingdom between 2018 and 2028, outside of the Newcastle takeover.

In April 2023 the Premier League changed its ownership rules to now disqualify potential owners and club directors who have been confirmed to have committed human rights abuses as defined by the United Kingdom's Global Human Rights Sanctions Regulations of 2020, and/or under sanctions by the United Kingdom government from the league's ownership and directors test.
