= Mike Ashley (businessman) =

British entrepreneur (born 1964)

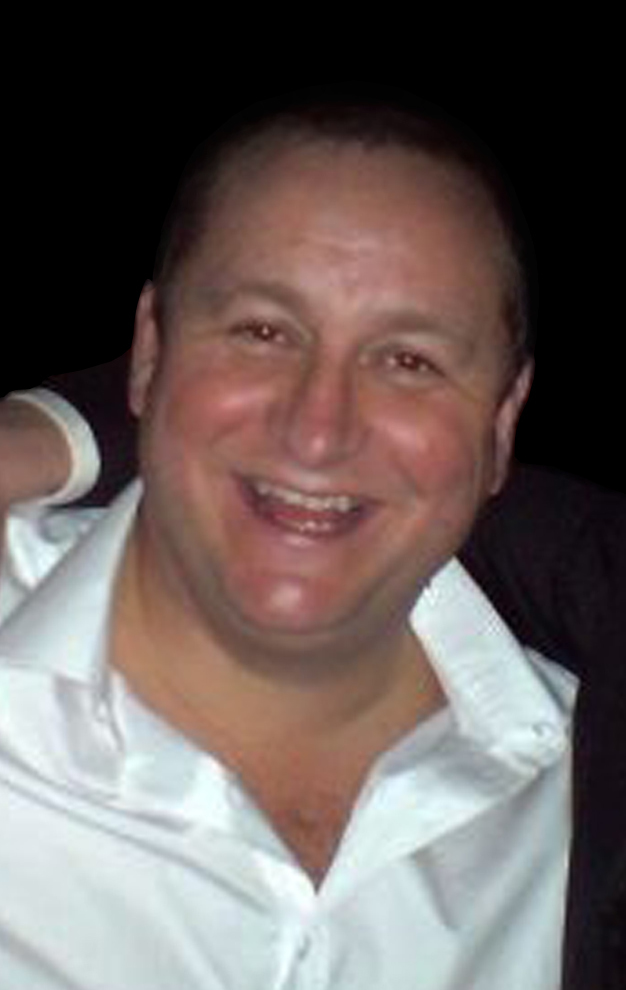
- Ashley in 2008
- Born: Michael James Wallace Ashley; 9 September 1964 (age 62); Walsall, Staffordshire, England
- Occupations: CEO of Sports Direct (1982–2018); Newcastle United owner (2007–21); CEO of Frasers Group (2018–2022)
- Years active: 1980–present
- Spouse: Linda Jerlmyr (m. 1988; div. 2003)
- Children: 3

Michael James Wallace Ashley (born 9 September 1964) is a British entrepreneur who is the founder and former chief executive of Frasers Group plc (formerly Sports Direct International). He owned Newcastle United Football Club between 2007 and 2021.

According to the Sunday Times Rich List in 2026, Ashley was the 48th richest person in the UK with an estimated net worth of £3.44 billion. In August 2021, Ashley announced that he intended to step down as chief executive of Frasers Group in May 2022, but would remain a director of the main board. He was succeeded as chief executive by his son-in-law, Michael Murray, on 1 May 2022. In September 2022, Frasers Group announced that Ashley would not stand for re-election as a director and would leave the board following the company's annual general meeting on 19 October 2022.

== Early life ==
Ashley was born in Walsall in the West Midlands in 1964 and grew up in Burnham, Buckinghamshire. His father was a manager at a food distribution depot. Ashley was educated at Burnham Grammar School and left school at 16 without any qualifications.

== Career ==
In 1982, at age 18, he opened his first sport and ski shop in Maidenhead with a £10,000 (equivalent to £37,315 in 2024) loan from his family. The chain quickly expanded in and around London and in the late 1990s, Ashley rebranded the chain as Sports Soccer. He was a sole trader and was not required to file accounts at Companies House; Sports Soccer became a limited liability company in 1999. Ashley hired Merrill Lynch for an initial public offering in November 2006 and the group was initially valued at up to £2.5bn ahead of the flotation on the London Stock Exchange.

The first brand Ashley added to his portfolio was Donnay Sports, followed by Dunlop Slazenger in February 2003, which he purchased for £40 million. He acquired Karrimor in March 2003 and later purchased Kangol for £10 million. Ashley took a £9 million stake and signed a long-term deal with Umbro. In mid-2006, he took a 25% stake in Matalan and installed mezzanine floors in larger Matalan stores for Sports World outlets. He also had a 29.4% stake in Blacks Leisure Group, owner of Millets and Mambo, and in 2005 purchased 9% stake in JJB Sports and 19% stake in JD Sports. In 2006, it overtook JJB Sports as the UK's largest sportswear retailer. He also owns Lonsdale. In 2019, there were more than 400 Sports Direct, Lillywhites, and USC stores in the United Kingdom, which employed more than 20,000 people across the UK, Ireland, Belgium and Slovenia.

Sports Direct acquired a 38.5% stake in retailer Game Digital and, in June 2019, Ashley placed a £52 million bid to buy The Times. In February 2020, he bought a 12.5% stake in Mulberry and, in August, his Fraser Group purchased assets from DW Sports Fitness in a deal worth up to £44 million. The group initially bought 46 leisure clubs and 31 retail outlets from DW Sports Fitness for £37 million to merge with its own business. In February 2023, it was announced that he was in advanced negotiations to buy The Mall Luton and Overgate Centre for a combined total of £100m.

In 2000, Ashley gave the Office of Fair Trading evidence of business meetings held by sports retailers to fix the price of football shirts. At a meeting held at Allsports' chairman David Hughes' home in Cheshire, Dave Whelan reportedly told Ashley: "There's a club in the north, son, and you're not part of it." On 26 July 2017, Ashley won a legal dispute against investment banker Jeffrey Blue, who alleged that during a "night of heavy drinking" at the Horse and Groom pub in London, Ashley agreed to pay Blue £15 million if Sport Direct's shares doubled to £8. The High Court ruled (in Blue v Ashley) that no-one would have thought that what Ashley said was serious. In March 2020, Ashley and Sports Direct were criticised after an announcement that they would stay open despite increased government restrictions associated with the COVID-19 pandemic. A few days later, they announced that they would be closing until given the green light to reopen by the government.

On 31 January 2010, an episode of BBC North East and Cumbria's Inside Out, titled "Mike Ashley Uncovered," journalist and host Chris Jackson travelled to Thailand to visit Lonsdale's factories. His experiences purchasing Newcastle United without knowing how much debt the club was in were also detailed. Neither Ashley nor his representatives showed interest in taking part in the film, declaring that the film was producing a majority of inaccuracies. They did, however, state that they would be reviewing the film closely. No further comments were made. In 2016, he was ordered by the Department for Business, Innovation and Skills to investigate working conditions at a Sports Direct warehouse in Shirebrook following allegations of misconduct. During the hearing, MPs compared Sports Direct to a "Victorian workhouse." In 2020, The Guardian reported that an undercover investigation revealed that working conditions had improved only incrementally.

On 20 December 2024, Mike Ashley faced rejection from Boohoo shareholders in his bid for a board seat, with 64% voting against his appointment during a meeting in Manchester. Despite Frasers Group holding a 27 per cent stake as Boohoo's largest shareholder, the online retailer cited "irreconcilable conflicts of interest" in opposing the appointments.

In February 2026, Mike Ashley was listed on the Sunday Times Tax list with an estimated £175.9 million.

== Football ==
=== Newcastle United ===
On 23 May 2007, Ashley bought Sir John Hall's 41.6% stake in Newcastle United at one pound per share, for a total cost of £55,342,223 via his company St James Holdings Ltd. Under the terms of UK takeover law, purchases of more than 30% of a company require the buyer to offer to buy remaining shares at the same or greater price. On 31 May, it was reported that the Newcastle board were considering Ashley's offer and, on 7 June, chairman Freddy Shepherd agreed to sell his 28% share to Ashley. By 15 June 2007, Ashley owned a 77.06% stake in Newcastle United, on course to withdraw the club from the stock exchange, having surpassed the 75% threshold required. The following month, Ashley paid around £134 million to acquire the remaining 22.94%, making him sole owner of the club. He paid off large sums of debt inherited from the previous owner but was criticised for not doing due diligence when buying the club, as he subsequently revealed he had been unaware of issues such as the upfront payment of club finances, including the Northern Rock sponsorship and the presence of outstanding liabilities for long-past player transfers.

Ashley installed Chris Mort as chairman and gave him the responsibility to run the club. Meanwhile, Ashley watched games from the stands among other fans. Sunderland publicly refused to give Ashley permission to wear his team shirt in the Stadium of Light corporate box for the Tyne–Wear derby on 10 November. Instead of dressing up for the game, as is customary, Ashley watched the game from the stands with other Newcastle fans as usual. Ashley's popularity increased further with the return of Kevin Keegan as manager on 16 January 2008 to replace the unpopular Sam Allardyce. On 30 August 2008, Ashley was shown on live television drinking beer while with fans in the away stand during Newcastle's game against Arsenal in London, contravening Premier League licensing rules stating that alcohol may not be consumed in sight of the pitch. Ashley subsequently "received words of advice" from the police during the game. A Newcastle United statement said Ashley had been given the beer and told that it was non-alcoholic, despite the fact that Emirates Stadium does not sell non-alcoholic beer.

On 2 September 2008, Ashley learned that Keegan was allegedly sacked by managing director Derek Llambias after expressing disdain with Director of Football Dennis Wise's interference in team matters. Keegan's official resignation on 4 September led to prolonged protests from fans, who dubbed Ashley and Wise the "Cockney Mafia." The League Managers Association advised the club to develop a structure to satisfy Keegan's replacement and to avoid damage to the club's image. Ashley put the club up for sale on 14 September, one day after the first home game since Keegan's resignation, which Ashley did not attend. He acknowledged the fans' anger and stated that he had the utmost respect for Keegan, and no longer wanted to subsidise the club, as he believed it would no longer be safe for him or his family to attend matches. He appointed Joe Kinnear as temporary Director of Football, replacing Wise, as he began his search. After a trip to the Middle East, reportedly to solicit potential buyers, Ashley handed responsibility of the club's sale to a London law firm. The Newcastle United Supporters Club, an organisation meant to "properly" represent fans' views to future Board members, was established at this time, and there was an increase in interest of whether it was feasible to have a fan buyout of the club. On 28 December, Ashley announced that the club was no longer up for sale after no acceptable buyer was identified.

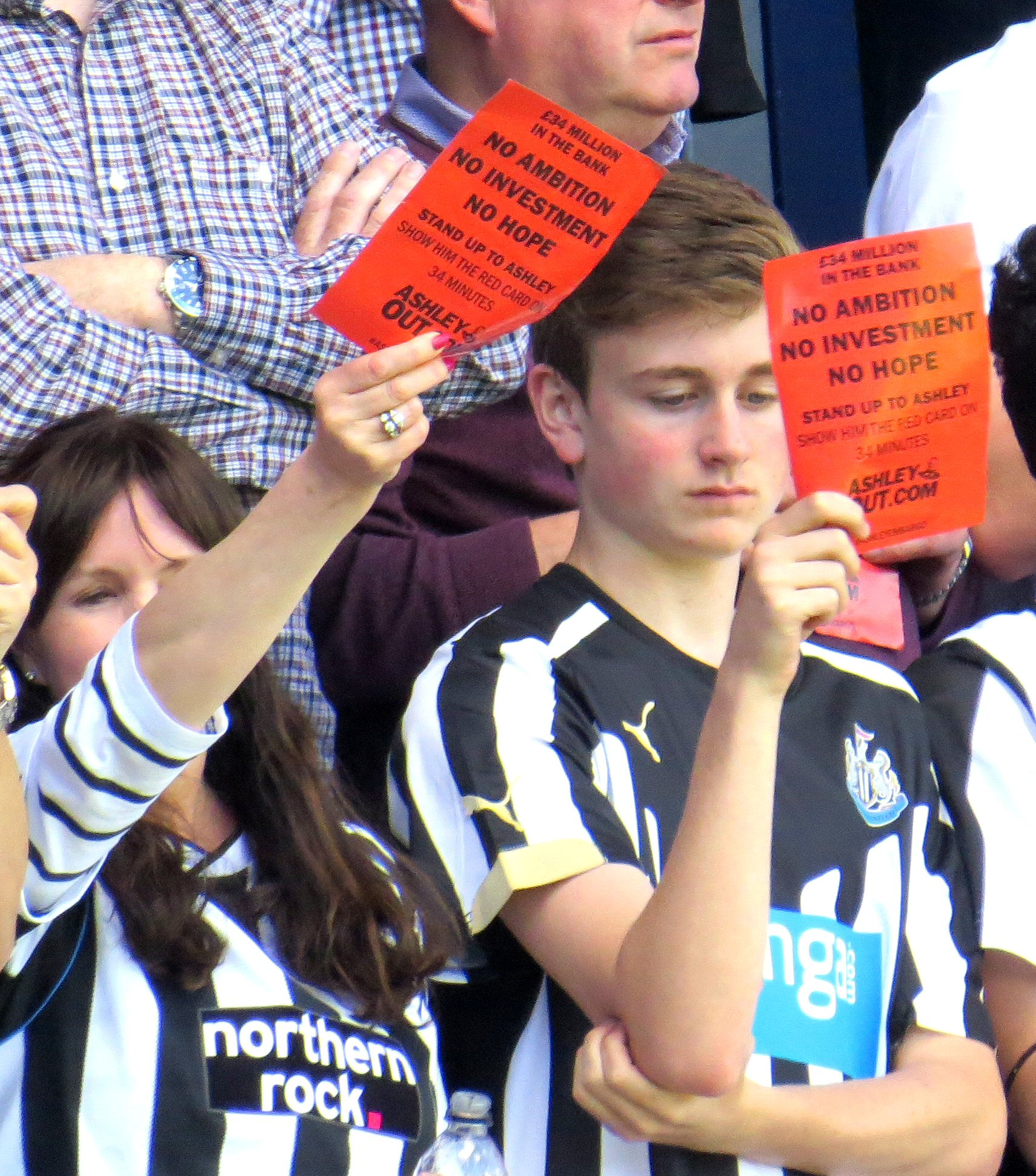
Newcastle fans show "Mike Ashley Out" cards away to QPR in May 2015.

In January 2009, interim manager Joe Kinnear was offered a full-time position at the club, but suffered heart trouble in February and took leave from the club. On 1 April, Ashley appointed Alan Shearer to assume Kinnear's duties; Shearer, however, was unable to achieve more than five points from the eight games played under his charge. On 24 May, Newcastle United was relegated to the Championship; the following day, Ashley apologised to fans for mistakes made throughout the season and praised the staff, including Shearer and Kinnear, for their efforts. Ashley began searching for a buyer again in August and September 2009. Local businessman Barry Moat reportedly opened negotiations with the club but these fell through. On 2 October, a Premier League arbitration panel found the club guilty of "constructive dismissal" and Ashley was made to pay Keegan £2,000,000 compensation plus interest for his mistreatment during the time at the club. The club was off the market again by 27 October and Ashley put an additional £20m into the club. This move was criticised by fans, as he had stated the week prior that he regretted the purchase of the club and felt he never had the required stance and knowledge to own a football club. In this statement, the club also announced they would be attempting to sell the club's naming rights to the stadium in an effort to pay off debts. This move outraged fans, who argued that the club would lose heritage if the name was changed. A few days later, on 4 November, it was announced that Ashley's Sports Direct would sponsor the stadium, rebranding it the "sportsdirect.com @ St James' Park Stadium" until the end of the season.

Criticism from fans mounted on 6 November 2010, when manager Chris Hughton was sacked and subsequently replaced with Alan Pardew. Ashley assumed the role of managing director following the June 2013 resignation of Llambias; Lee Charnley was hired as his permanent replacement in 2014. On the final day of the 2014–15 season, Ashley gave his first televised interview to Sky Sports, eight years after buying the club. He stated that he would sell up, but only when the club had won a trophy, quickly reiterating that qualifying for the Champions League would also count. With Steve McClaren's appointment as head coach, Ashley stepped down from the Newcastle United board of directors. Within ten months, McClaren left and was replaced by Rafael Benítez, and Ashley gave another interview, where he reiterated his regret about buying the team but admitted that he was "wedded" to the club. He also felt that Benítez was the right man to keep the club in the Premier League. The club was relegated for a second time under Ashley's ownership at the end of the following season after local rivals Sunderland beat Everton 3–0.

During the final stages of buying the club for £300m from Ashley in April 2020, a consortium consisting of PCP Capital Partners, Reuben Brothers, and the Public Investment Fund of Saudi Arabia received notification from the Premier League that they were required to undertake the Owners' and Directors' Test to prevent corruption. The document detailed PCP's long-running legal case against Barclays in particular. Two months later, the consortium pulled out of the buying process, citing the prolonged delay from the Premier League to communicate a decision as the catalyst. Ashley was then engaged in various legal battles with the Premier League, after Newcastle United released a statement saying that "the club and its owners do not accept that Premier League chief executive Richard Masters and the Premier League have acted appropriately" in relation to their conducting of the Owners' and Directors' Test. On 7 October 2021, the consortium finalised the £300 million purchase of the club.

=== Other clubs ===
Ashley acquired a 8.92% stake in the Rangers International Football Club, the parent company of Scottish football club Rangers, in October 2014. The Scottish Football Association rejected Ashley's request to raise his shareholding to 29.9% due to the fact he already owned a large amount of Newcastle United shares, which was seen as a conflict of interest. In January 2015, Rangers fans protested against Mike Ashley's plans to secure a £10 million loan using the club's stadium as security, expressing major concern and distrust about his nature and the purpose of his intentions. On 23 June 2017, Ashley sold his entire Rangers shareholding to Club 1872 and Julian Wolhardt.

On 17 November 2022, Ashley bought the CBS arena, Coventry City's stadium. On 13 December 2022, it was reported that Ashley had issued an eviction notice to the club, which caused backlash from both the club and fans, as Coventry had previously signed a contract letting them stay in the stadium for an additional 10 years in 2021. The club had signed a short-term contract to extend their tenancy. On 23 August 2025, the club announced it had purchased the stadium from Frasers Group, thus granting them full ownership of the stadium.

== Personal life ==
Ashley is very private about his personal life. In 1988, he married Linda Jerlmyr, a Swedish-born economics graduate, and the couple have three children. Ashley and Jerlmyr divorced in 2003, culminating in one of the biggest settlements in British legal history, with Ashley reportedly handing over the family home, multiple properties, and assets with a total worth of £50 million.
