= Dinnage =

Dinnage is a surname. Notable people with the surname include:

- Jessica Dinnage (born 1993), Danish actress
- Rosemary Dinnage (1928–2015), British author and critic
- Susanna Dinnage (born 1966/67), British businesswoman

== See also ==
- Dinenage
