= Richard Masters (football executive) =

British football executive

- Education: Solihull School
- Alma mater: University College London
- Title: Chief executive of the Premier League

Richard Masters is a British football executive. He is the current chief executive of the Premier League, the highest tier of association football in England.

== Biography ==
Masters attended the independent Solihull School. He later studied for a BSc Economics and Geography degree at University College London.

He was the marketing manager for England and Wales Cricket Board from 1994 to 2000, before serving as commercial director for the English Football League from 2001 to 2006. He moved to the Premier League in 2006 where he became the director of sales and marketing, holding the position from January 2006 until November 2018. In 2019, English Football Association announced Masters as the CEO of the Premier League, the top tier of English football.

Masters has two sons, and is a supporter of Aston Villa F.C..

== Premier League ==
Masters was appointed as the chief executive of the Premier League in November 2019. This followed a year-long interim period in the position, after Richard Scudamore resigned in December 2018. Masters' role was created after Scudamore's executive chairman role was split into the two roles of chief executive and chair, following Scudamore's resignation. While Alison Brittain was appointed as the latest chair on 26 July 2022, Masters retains authority as holding the highest position at the Premier League, with his other responsibilities including leading negotiations on new media rights contracts, resolving club disputes and ownership issues, and overseeing operations.

Masters was the Premier League's fourth choice for the role, following a protracted recruitment process that involved Susanna Dinnage, Tim Davie and David Pemsel all being offered - but later declining - the position ahead of him. There were also accusations that the biggest teams in the Premier League held too much influence over the process, with Liverpool and Manchester United alleged to have held private talks with candidates chosen by the Premier League's official nominating committee, before deciding whether to enact their unofficial veto over the decision.

=== Controversies ===
==== "Small clubs" remark ====
On 16 January 2024, Masters described Nottingham Forest and Everton Football Clubs as "small clubs" during a session of the Culture, Media and Sport Committee, prompting a furious reaction from fans and media alike. The chair of the CMS Committee, Dame Caroline Dinenage MP, wrote to Masters asking him to clarify his comments, stating:

“Richard Masters’ implication that nine-times league title winners Everton and double European Cup winners Nottingham Forest are ‘small clubs’ will have raised eyebrows with fans. To suggest clubs are categorised according to size raises wider questions about whether every member of the league truly does receive treatment that is fair and consistent."

==== Governance review ====
On 22 July 2021, Tracey Crouch MP, chair of the fan-led review into the UK's football governance, announced that the Premier League under Masters had "lost the trust and confidence" of fans within the review's interim findings. The review further recommended that a new Independent Football Regulator be created to oversee the league's governance.

==== APT regulations crisis ====
On 9 October 2024, Masters withdrew from a high-level golf event with key Premier League broadcasters to focus on the crisis surrounding the Premier League’s Associated Party Transaction (APT) regulations. On 7 October 2024, an independent tribunal had ruled that the league’s regulations were unlawful following a legal challenge from Manchester City. Masters was due to chair a subsequent emergency meeting between all twenty Premier League clubs on 17 October 2024.

==== Newcastle United takeover ====
On 9 September 2020, Masters was accused by Newcastle United of not "acting appropriately" in relation to the Premier League's blocking of the attempted takeover of the club by a consortium consisting of PCP Capital Partners, Reuben Brothers and the Public Investment Fund of Saudi Arabia. This followed accusations from the consortium that the Premier League had deliberately misapplied their Owners' and Directors' test in order to frustrate the deal, due to improper influence from various third parties to block it. On 29 September 2021, a competition appeal tribunal heard that Masters and the Premier League "abused its position" after it was "improperly influenced" by outside agencies such as the Qatari owned media outlet, BeIN Sports.

On 28 March 2023, Masters told the MPs that he could not comment on whether Newcastle's connection with Saudi Arabia was being reinvestigated following a US court case, which described the Saudi PIF as "a sovereign instrumentality of the Kingdom of Saudi Arabia". The court case also said about the PIF governor and the Newcastle chairman, Yasir Al-Rumayyan, that he is "a sitting minister of the government" with "sovereign immunity". It raised concerns about the degree of independence between PIF and Newcastle.

Relationship with Manchester City and serious allegations of biases and incompetence .

Richard Masters has faced huge criticism from Manchester City fans of alleged favouritism and inability to scrutinise historical giants of the English game. City fans have echoed these frustrations through displays outside Premier League board meetings. Masters strongly denies these allegations stating to a Parliamentary committee that the Premier League board “applies rules consistently irrespective of the club in question”.

On November 16 2026, reports came out alleging that Masters and other top Premier League officials are asking for help from Premier League clubs amidst possible threats of Manchester City sponsors filing for a defamation case. This is despite their initial public confidence that the Premier League commissions verdict established all the facts regarding Manchester City’s activity regarding sponsorship deals.

Richard Masters has been chief executive of the Premier League amidst an ongoing disciplinary process with Premier League club Manchester City. The club were found guilty of 114 out of 115 charges of breaches to the Premier League’s financial rules however this is subject to an ongoing appeal. The Premier League faces allegations of perpetrating a conspiracy theory against the club by CEO Ferran Soriano.

Calls to Resign

Due to allegations of incompetence and bias, a petition which was started in 2024 has called for Masters immediate resignation as chief executive of the Premier League. The petition states “as passionate football fans we have been deeply affected by the actions and decisions made by Richard Masters. His reign has been marked by favouritism and dictatorial approach to the disciplinary process.” The petition is now at 24,000 signatures.
