= Blue v Ashley =

2017 English contract law case on formation

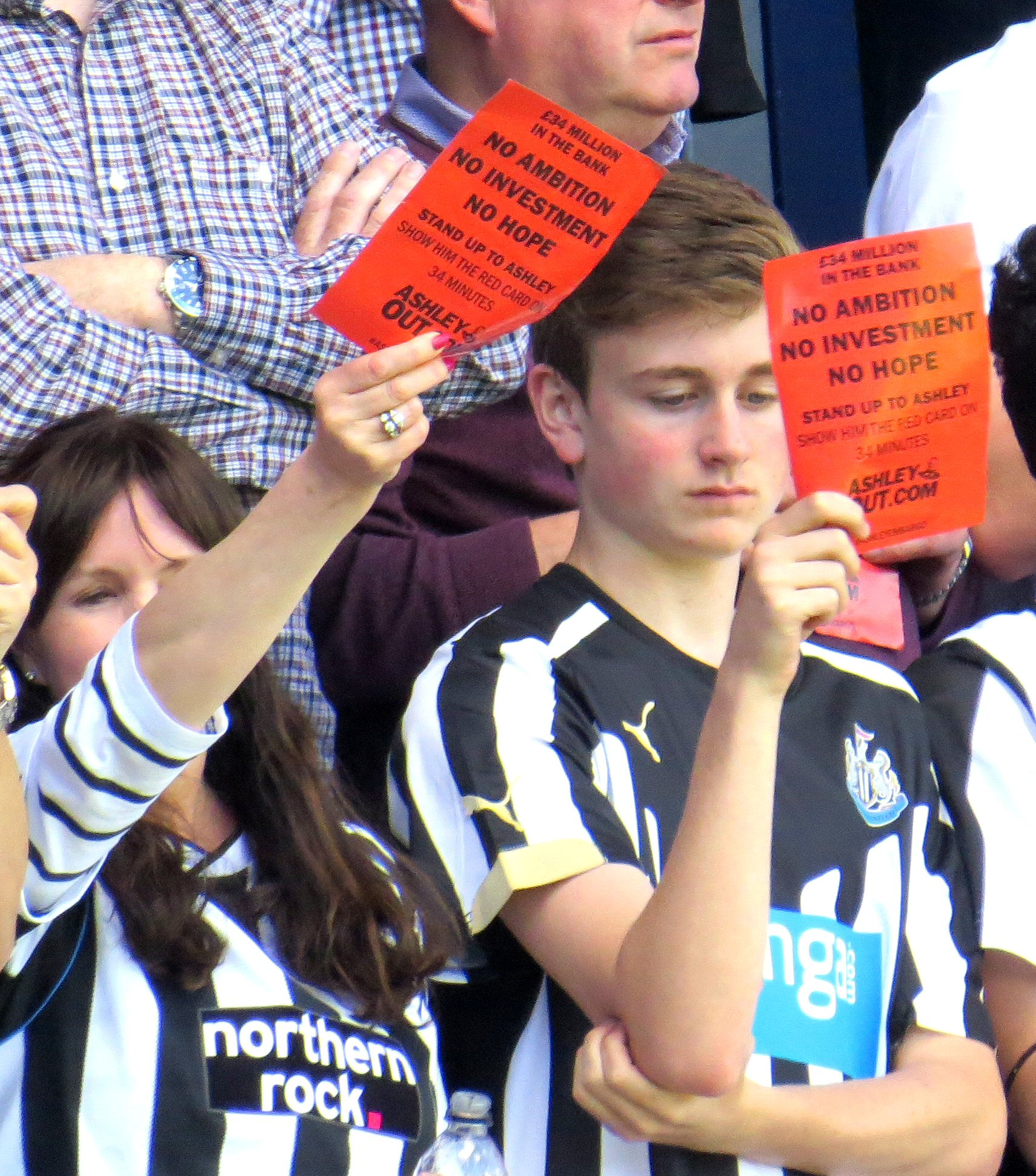
- Football fans hold "Mike Ashley out" fliers, after controversial actions at Sports Direct
- Court: High Court
- Citation: [2017] EWHC 1928

Keywords
- Agreement

Blue v Ashley [2017] EWHC 1928 is an English contract law case, concerning the objective question of whether there is a contract.

== Facts ==
Two men were drinking and talking about business in the Horse and Groom pub at 128 Great Portland Street, London. Jeffrey Blue—an investment banker—was told by Mike Ashley that if he managed to make the shares of Sports Direct International Plc reach £8, he would receive a bonus of £15 million. Blue then claimed this was a binding contract, and brought a claim.

== Judgment ==
The High Court held that there was no binding contract because, at the time, nobody thought that the offer was genuine. Several elements were taken into account: the tone, the language, the setting and the purpose of the meeting. Leggatt J said the following:

(i) Agreement

50. In general, the agreement necessary for a contract is reached either by the parties signing a document containing agreed terms or by one party making an offer which the other accepts. Acceptance may be by words or conduct. Typically, acceptance involves promising to do something but in one kind of contract known as a "unilateral contract", where the offer made by A is to reward someone for doing something, a contract is established when the recipient of the offer (B) starts to perform the action required to earn the reward, even though B does not promise A to do anything. The example of a "unilateral contract" taught to all first year law students is an offer by A to pay B £100 if B walks from London to York. B is not obliged to walk to York, but if B sets out on the journey, A's offer becomes contractually binding.

...

VI. Was a binding contract made? 80. The next question is whether what was said on 24 January 2013 gave rise to a binding contract. In answering this question, the key issue is whether, when Mr Ashley said that he would pay Mr Blue £15 million if he could get the Sports Direct share price to £8 per share, this would reasonably have been understood as a serious offer capable of creating a legally binding contract. Having heard the evidence, I am quite sure that it would not. I have reached this conclusion for eight main reasons.

The setting 81. The first is the setting. As described by Mr Tracey, it was "five guys and a barman in a pub". A fair amount of alcohol had been consumed. Those circumstances by themselves do not prevent a contract from being made – any more than did the fact that in MacInnes v Gross [2017] EWHC 46 (QB) the relevant discussion took place over dinner in a smart restaurant. As Coulson J said in that case (at para 81), a contract can be made anywhere in any circumstances. But an evening of drinking in a pub with three investment bankers is an unlikely setting in which to negotiate a contractual bonus arrangement with a consultant who was meeting them on behalf of the company.

82. It was argued on behalf of Mr Blue that, while this might be true in the case of an ordinary businessman, Mr Ashley is not an ordinary businessman but is someone who adopts an "unorthodox approach to taking business decisions in informal settings while consuming substantial amounts of alcohol". In particular, Mr Blue relied on the fact that, at Sports Direct's weekly senior management meetings he had witnessed Mr Ashley (and others) drinking alcohol, sometimes allegedly in copious quantities. When Mr Blue was working at Sports Direct such meetings were held at the Lion Hotel in Worksop. Between 10 and 20 members of Sports Direct's senior management would typically attend and Mr Blue attended these meetings regularly. The meetings would begin by, at latest, 8pm with people first congegrating in the bar area. There is a conference facility at the hotel where the main part of the meeting would take place and where food would be served at around 9:30pm. The purpose of the meetings was for senior managers to update each other on the performance of the business and current developments. The meetings were divided into two parts, each around an hour long. One part would consist of a presentation from someone on a particular topic. Topics that featured regularly included: (i) retail operations, (ii) online strategy, (iii) IT and infrastructure, (iv) international expansion, (v) brand management, and (vi) property. The other part of the meeting consisted of going through a "management pack" of information and receiving a weekly update on each area of the business.

83. Mr Ashley agreed that at these meetings alcohol was frequently consumed and said that, at a typical meeting, he might drink four pints of beer followed by wine with the food or, if he stayed with beer, say six pints of beer during the evening. Mr Blue said that he thought Mr Ashley made alcohol freely available at these meetings as a deliberate strategy to encourage his senior managers to speak more openly than might otherwise be the case in a more formal meeting environment. He described this approach as typical of Mr Ashley's personality and business style. He may well be right about this but the evidence about these meetings does not seem to me to carry Mr Blue's case very far. The Sports Direct senior management meetings certainly show that Mr Ashley is happy to combine discussion of business matters with the consumption of alcohol. But there is no evidence to suggest that Mr Ashley has ever negotiated or concluded a contract at one of these meetings. The evening at the Horse & Groom was, in any event, a considerably less formal occasion than the senior management meetings, as there was no agenda or structure for the occasion and the conversation was largely social or general chat, rather than being specifically directed to any business subject.

(ii) The purpose of the occasion 84. In addition to its setting, a second significant feature of the context in which the conversation on 24 January 2013 took place is the purpose of the occasion. Counsel for Mr Blue are plainly right in saying that the meeting with the ESIB traders was not merely social and that it had a business purpose. But that purpose was not to discuss Mr Blue's work for Sports Direct or terms for his remuneration. It was an outward-facing occasion in which Mr Ashley and Mr Blue were both representing Sports Direct in meeting the representatives of a prospective service provider. In particular, the aim was to enable the senior people on the trading side of ESIB to meet Mr Ashley in an informal setting in order to build a commercial relationship with Mr Ashley / Sports Direct. I accept Mr Blue's evidence that, given the demands on his time, Mr Ashley would not have agreed to attend the meeting, let alone have invested the time and energy in it that he did, had he not believed that securing the services and enthusiastic support of ESIB as the company's new corporate broker was important for Sports Direct. But that very fact is inconsistent with the notion that it was an occasion to agree with Mr Blue a personal incentive bonus plan. Not only is it inherently unlikely that a matter personal to Mr Blue would have been the subject of serious discussion in the presence of strangers, but such a discussion would have been completely extraneous to the serious purpose which the meeting had.

(iii) The nature and tone of the conversation 85. The third feature of the occasion which is inconsistent with an intention to make a serious contractual offer to Mr Blue is the nature and tone of the conversation. Before the topic of the Sports Direct share price came up, there had been talk about football in which Mr Ashley had been impressing and flattering the ESIB traders by talking about potential purchases of players in the transfer market and making them feel they were getting an inside track on Mr Ashley's role as the owner of a Premier League club. When the conversation turned to the Sports Direct share price, it was obviously jocular, with some joshing about just how wealthy Mr Ashley would be if the share price were to reach various levels.

...

(iv) Lack of commercial sense 88. The fourth reason why no reasonable business person would have thought that a serious contractual offer was being made is that Mr Ashley had no commercial reason to offer to pay Mr Blue £15 million as an incentive to do work aimed at increasing the Sports Direct share price. I do not accept the submission made on Mr Blue's behalf that he was at that stage "a trusted and close business associate of Mr Ashley". He had only been working as a consultant for Sports Direct for around two months and Mr Ashley did not know Mr Blue particularly well...

...

89. Counsel for Mr Blue argued that promising to pay Mr Blue £15 million if he could get the share price above £8 made "obvious" or "perfect" commercial sense for Mr Ashley. Their argument was that, if Mr Blue managed to achieve the £8 share price target, Mr Ashley would personally be worth an additional £1.6 billion – or around a hundred times what he would have to pay Mr Blue. If, on the other hand, the share price did not reach £8 per share, Mr Ashley would still benefit from Mr Blue's efforts without them costing him anything at all.

90. It seems to me that there are two major flaws in this argument. The first is that, had Mr Ashley been having a serious business discussion about paying Mr Blue an incentive bonus, I am sure that he would not have approached it by remarking how enormously the value of his shares in Sports Direct would increase if the share price were to double to £8 per share. No entrepreneur who has built up a successful business decides whether or how much money to pay for something purely on the basis of what they might gain: they are also concerned not to incur an unnecessary cost. My impression from the evidence accords with the submission of Mr Blue's counsel (made in the context of the £1 million payment) that Mr Ashley is "clearly a person who understands the value of money … He is simply not the kind of person to throw one million pounds at Mr Blue ..."

...

(v) Incongruity with Mr Blue's role 94. This point goes further than merely showing the absence of a good commercial reason to offer Mr Blue a £15 million incentive. Mr Blue's evidence – which I have accepted as probably accurate – is that Mr Ashley said he would pay the £15 million to Mr Blue if Mr Blue could "get" the Sports Direct share price above £8 per share. However, on even the most generous view of the value of Mr Blue's services, the idea that he could somehow, through his skills and contacts in corporate finance, "get" the share price to double its then level seems plainly fanciful....

(vi) Vagueness of the "offer" 97. This leads to the sixth reason why no reasonable person would have understood Mr Ashley to be making a contractual offer, which is that the "offer" was far too vague to have been seriously meant. Any serious discussion of a £15 million payment to incentivise Mr Blue would have required consideration of exactly what work Mr Blue was going to do to earn this bonanza and how the utility or effect of his work was going to be measured.

...

(vii) Perceptions of the ESIB witnesses 98. The seventh reason why I am confident that no reasonable person would have understood Mr Ashley to be making a contractual offer is that none of the three witnesses from ESIB who took part in the conversation thought that he was being serious.

...

(viii) Mr Blue's perception 102. My eighth and last main reason for concluding that, objectively, there was no intention to make a contract is that I am satisfied that Mr Blue himself did not understand there to be such an intention at the time when the conversation in the Horse & Groom took place or in the period immediately afterwards. That is indicated by Mr Tracey's evidence that he did not understand Mr Blue to be taking the conversation seriously when they first spoke about the evening (probably within the next day or so) but only gained this impression some months later at or around the time of the barbecue at Mr Blue's house on 10 August 2013....

...

VIII. Conclusion

142. In the course of a jocular conversation with three investment bankers in a pub on the evening of 24 January 2013, Mr Ashley said that he would pay Mr Blue £15 million if Mr Blue could get the price of Sports Direct shares (then trading at around £4 per share) to £8. Mr Blue expressed his agreement to that proposal and everyone laughed. Thirteen months later the Sports Direct share price did reach £8. But no reasonable person present in the Horse & Groom on 24 January 2013 would have thought that the offer to pay Mr Blue £15 million was serious and was intended to create a contract, and no one who was actually present in the Horse & Groom that evening – including Mr Blue – did in fact think so at the time. They all thought it was a joke. The fact that Mr Blue has since convinced himself that the offer was a serious one, and that a legally binding agreement was made, shows only that the human capacity for wishful thinking knows few bounds.

== See also ==
- English contract law
