= Saudi Arabia–United Kingdom relations =

- Saudi Arabia: United Kingdom

Diplomatic mission
- Embassy of Saudi Arabia, London, United Kingdom: Embassy of the United Kingdom, Riyadh, Saudi Arabia

Envoy
- Saudi Arabian Ambassador to the United Kingdom Khalid bin Bandar Al Saud: British Ambassador to Saudi Arabia Neil Crompton

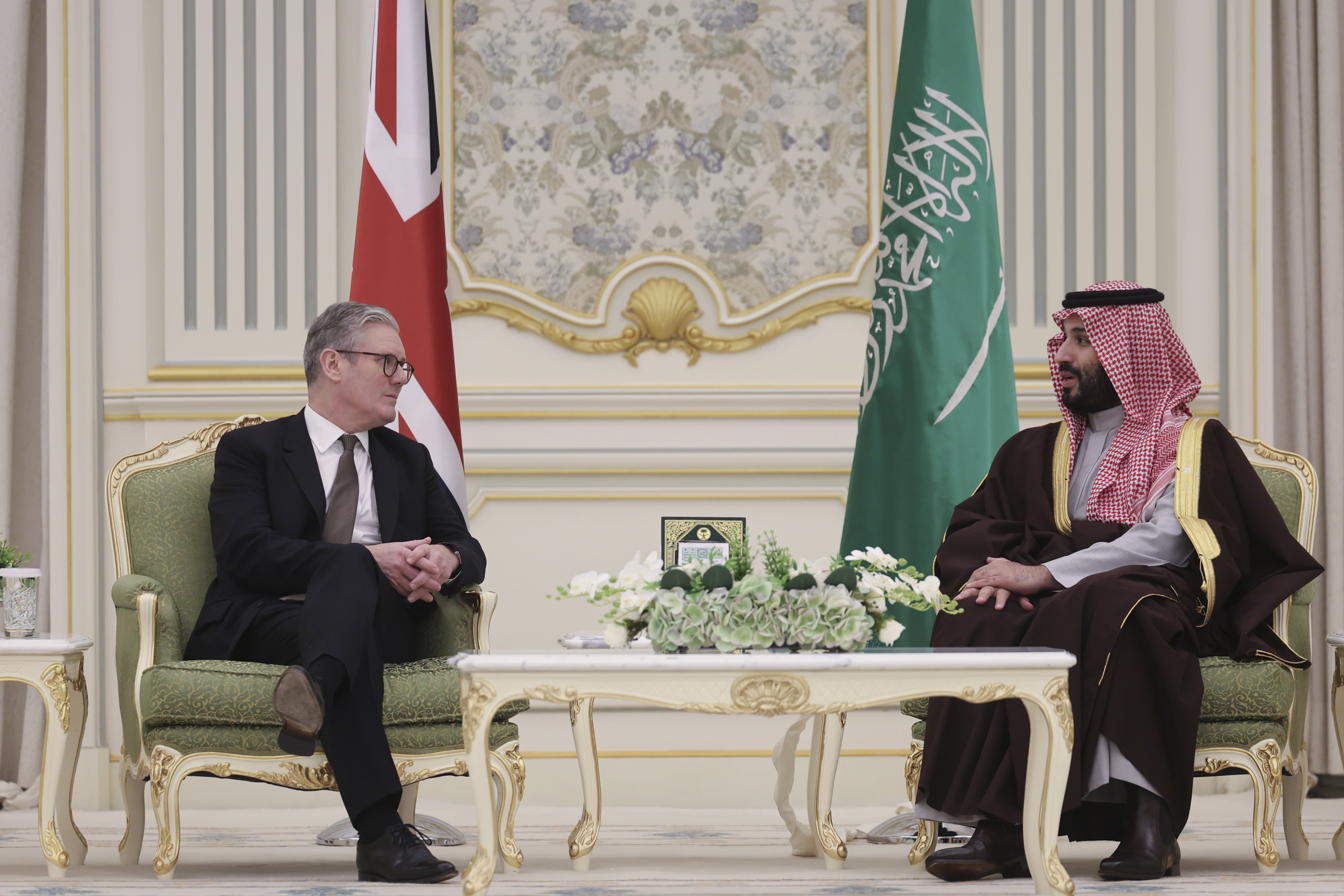
British Prime Minister Keir Starmer with Saudi Crown Prince Mohammed bin Salman in Riyadh, December 2024.

According to the British government, the United Kingdom of Great Britain and Northern Ireland and the Kingdom of Saudi Arabia have long been close allies. Relations between the two countries date back to 1848, when Faisal bin Turki, ruler of the Second Saudi state, formally requested the support of the British Political Resident in Bushire for his representative in Trucial Oman.

Saudi Arabia and the United Kingdom are strategic allies. There are more than 200 joint ventures between British and Saudi Companies, worth $17.5 billion, and some 30,000 British nationals are living and working in Saudi Arabia as well as nearly 100,000 Saudi nationals living in the UK. Saudi Arabia is the United Kingdom's primary trading partner in the Middle East and the United Kingdom is Saudi Arabia's closest European ally.

== History ==
In 1865, the British government sent Colonel Lewis Pelly to meet with the Saudi ruler Faisal bin Turki and develop bilateral relations with the Saudis, in order to spread British influence in the region after the British occupation of Bahrain. Lewis Pelly's initiative facilitated the development of a Saudi-British alliance, which subsequently led to a series of bilateral treaties between the Saudis and the British covering a range of commercial and military issues. In 1866, the Saudi state issued a declaration of friendship with the British, in which the Saudi ruler Abdullah ibn Faisal pledged to protect British assets in Saudi territories and refrain from initiating hostilities with other British allies.

After the second Saudi state was crushed, members of the Saudi dynasty found refuge in British-controlled Kuwait. With British help, Ibn Saud conquered Riyadh in 1902 and established a third Saudi-Wahhabi state. Following the Saudi capture of Riyadh, Ibn Saud and his father ʿAbd al-Raḥmān ibn Fayṣal Āl Saʿūd made several overtures to British officials and requested protectorate status for the third Saudi state on multiple occasions. However, in order to avoid openly provoking the Ottoman empire, these requests were declined by the British Foreign Office.

After the outbreak of the First World War in 1914, the British empire sought to secure military support of Ibn Saud and to mobilize Saudi forces against the Ottoman empire and its ally, the Emirate of Jabal Shammar. Britain offered formal guarantees to the Saudi state, including British protection, in return for Saudi support. Ibn Saud was committed to supporting British empire during World War 1, and signed the 1915 Treaty of Darin with the British government, thereby formalizing the Anglo-Saudi alliance and turning the Saudi state into a British protectorate. Britain's main objectives in securing Saudi support included defeating the Ottoman-aligned Rashidi Emirate in the Second Saudi-Rashidi war and safeguarding the logistics and military communications of British forces in the Gulf and Iraq. Following the signing of the Treaty of Darin in 1915, the Saudis became formally aligned with the Entente side during WW1.

On 20 May 1927, the British government and the Kingdom of Nejd concluded the Treaty of Jeddah, a further agreement. The United Kingdom was among the first states that recognised the country in 1926 and had a diplomatic delegation in the country. Saudi Arabia opened its embassy in London in 1930, which was the country's second official foreign affairs body abroad and led by Hafiz Wahba.

=== Al-Yamamah arms deal controversy ===
In 1985, British Prime Minister Margaret Thatcher and Bandar bin Sultan Al Saud, son of the Saudi defence minister, negotiated the Al-Yamamah arms deal for British-based arms company British Aerospace (now privatised and known as BAE Systems). Since then, the deal has brought in £43 billion in revenue for BAE Systems.

According to police estimates, more than £6 billion may have been paid to Saudi officials in order for BAE Systems to gain this contract. According to 'US sources', cited by the Guardian newspaper, millions of pounds went to Prince Bandar himself, distributed in chunks of up to $30 million (£15 million) at a time. Asked about allegations of royal corruption in 2001, Prince Bandar said: "If you tell me that building this whole country [...] out of $400bn, that we misused, or got, $50bn, I'll tell you, 'Yes. So what?'"

According to the Guardian, around £60 million was allegedly spent by BAE Systems on extravagant holidays, fleets of classic cars, shopping trips and escorts for Prince Turki bin Nasser Al Saud, who controlled the Royal Saudi Air Force. The newspaper also alleged that Bandar's father and Turki bin Nasser's father-in-law Prince Sultan bin Abdulaziz Al Saud was described by a British ambassador as having "a corrupt interest in all contracts" while the Guardian's legal sources alleged that BAE disguised many of the payments by making them through an anonymous offshore company called Poseidon.

With reference to this scandal, former British defence secretary Ian Gilmour, Baron Gilmour of Craigmillar told the BBC: "If you are paying bribes to high-up people in the government, the fact that it's illegal in Saudi law doesn't mean much."

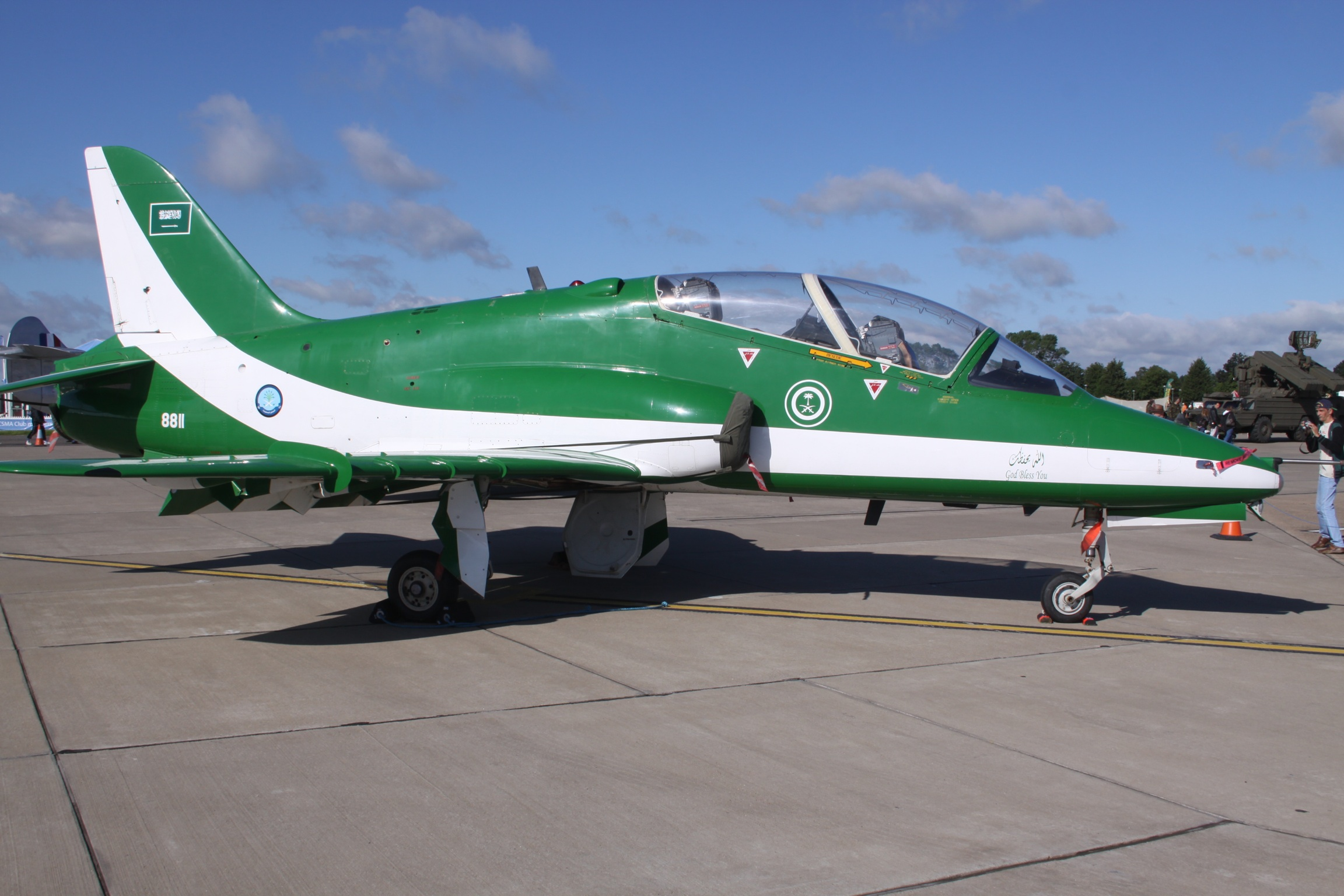
Royal Saudi Hawk at RAF Waddington

Senior British figures were aware of the allegations. Within days of the deal being announced, Margaret Thatcher's chief adviser Charles Powell, Baron Powell of Bayswater, who went on to work for BAE Systems, received an Arab-language magazine which detailed accusations of Bandar and others taking huge commissions. The British government advised the Ministry of Defence not to comment on the allegations.

Decades later, after these allegations were repeated in the Guardian newspaper in 2004, BAE Systems admitted it was being investigated by Britain's Serious Fraud Office. Several senior BAE Systems employees were interviewed or arrested.

In 2005, the United Kingdom and Saudi Arabia agreed a military agreement, where BAE Systems would equip Saudi Arabia with Eurofighter Typhoons. In 2006, the Saudis threatened to end co-operation with the UK unless the Serious Fraud Office dropped its investigation into BAE Systems over the Al-Yamamah arms deal. On 8 December 2006, Tony Blair (who was the British Prime Minister at the time), wrote a secret personal letter to the Attorney General, Lord Goldsmith, in which he urged Goldsmith to stop the Serious Fraud Office investigation. In the letter, Blair stated he was worried about the "critical difficulty" the investigation could cause for the negotiations of the new Eurofighter Typhoon sales contracts. Shortly after, the investigation was shelved on 'national security' grounds. This decision was later found to have not been legal by the High Court. Two senior judges condemned what they called the government's "abject" surrender to a "blatant" threat by the Saudis.

While BAE Systems never admitted to corruption or bribery, they did pay fines of £286 million in order to settle British and American probes into corruption at the company. No further action was taken against the company and nobody working for the British or Saudi governments or BAE Systems ever served prison time as a result of the allegations.

=== British reaction to Saudi-led Intervention in Yemen ===
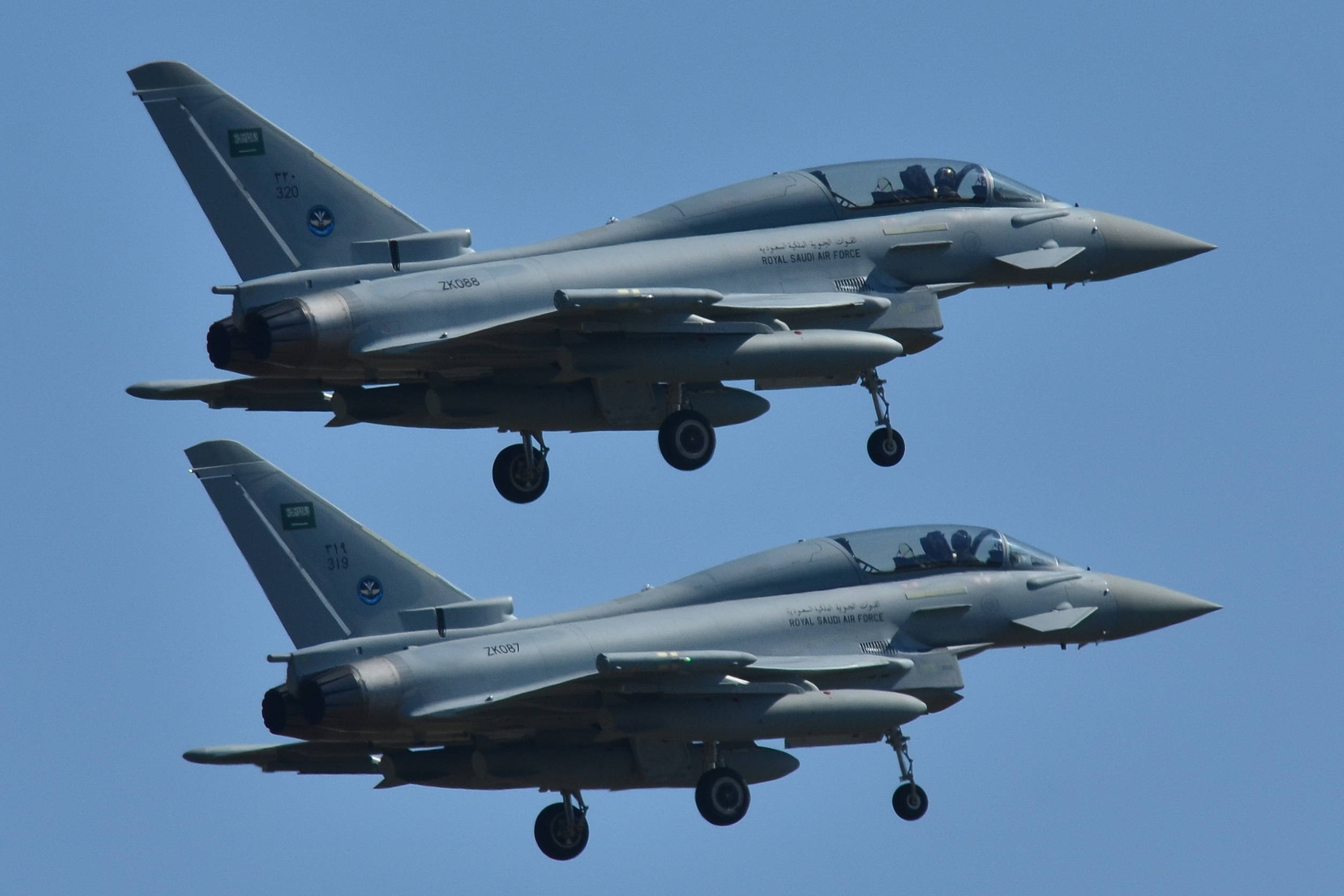
Saudi Arabia's UK-supplied Eurofighter Typhoons are playing a central role in Saudi-led bombing campaign in Yemen.

In March 2015, after Houthi rebels took control of Yemen and ousted former president Abdrabbuh Mansur Hadi, a coalition of Gulf states led by Saudi Arabia began to bomb and impose a naval blockade on Yemen. The coalition was led by the Saudi Arabian Air, Ground and Naval forces, who confirmed the use of 100 fighter jets, 150.000 ground forces and some naval units. Saudi Arabia was assisted by the armies of the United Arab Emirates, Bahrain, Kuwait, Sudan and Egypt who have each committed between 3 and 30 fighter jets, as well as Jordan and Morocco, who confirmed their support, but the details of which remain unspecified. Between the start of the attack and December 2016, Britain licensed £3.3 billion worth of arms to Saudi Arabia despite protests from the public, politicians, media outlets and campaign groups. This included £2.2 billion worth of ML10 licenses (aircraft, helicopters and drones), £1.1 billion worth of ML4 licenses (grenades, bombs, missiles, countermeasures) and £430,000 of ML6 licenses (armoured vehicles and tanks).

The UK's biggest arms company BAE Systems sold over £17 billion worth of equipment and services to the Saudi Arabian military since 2015.

In June 2016, Campaign Against Arms Trade gained permission from the British High Court to bring a judicial review against the government over British arms sales to Saudi Arabia. In response to this decision, Campaign Against Arms Trade spokesman Andrew Smith said: "This is a historic decision and we welcome the fact that arms exports to Saudi Arabia will be given the full scrutiny of a legal review, but they should never have been allowed in the first place. The fact that UK aircraft and bombs are being used against Yemen is a terrible sign of how broken the arms export control system is. For too long, government has focused on maximising and promoting arms sales, rather than on the human rights of those they are used against". After hearing closed evidence kept concealed "on grounds of national security", Lord Justice Burnett and Mr Justice Haddon-Cave found that the secretary of state's decision to sustain the UK's arms trade with Saudi Arabia was "not unlawful". CAAT vowed to appeal the decision.

In November 2016, two parliamentary committees (Committee on Arms Export Controls and International Development and Business Committee) released a joint report calling for the British government to stop licensing arms exports to Saudi Arabia until a UN investigation had been conducted into alleged breaches of international humanitarian law. However, British government ministers Liam Fox, Boris Johnson, Michael Fallon and Priti Patel released a statement saying they disagreed with the parliamentary committee's recommendations.

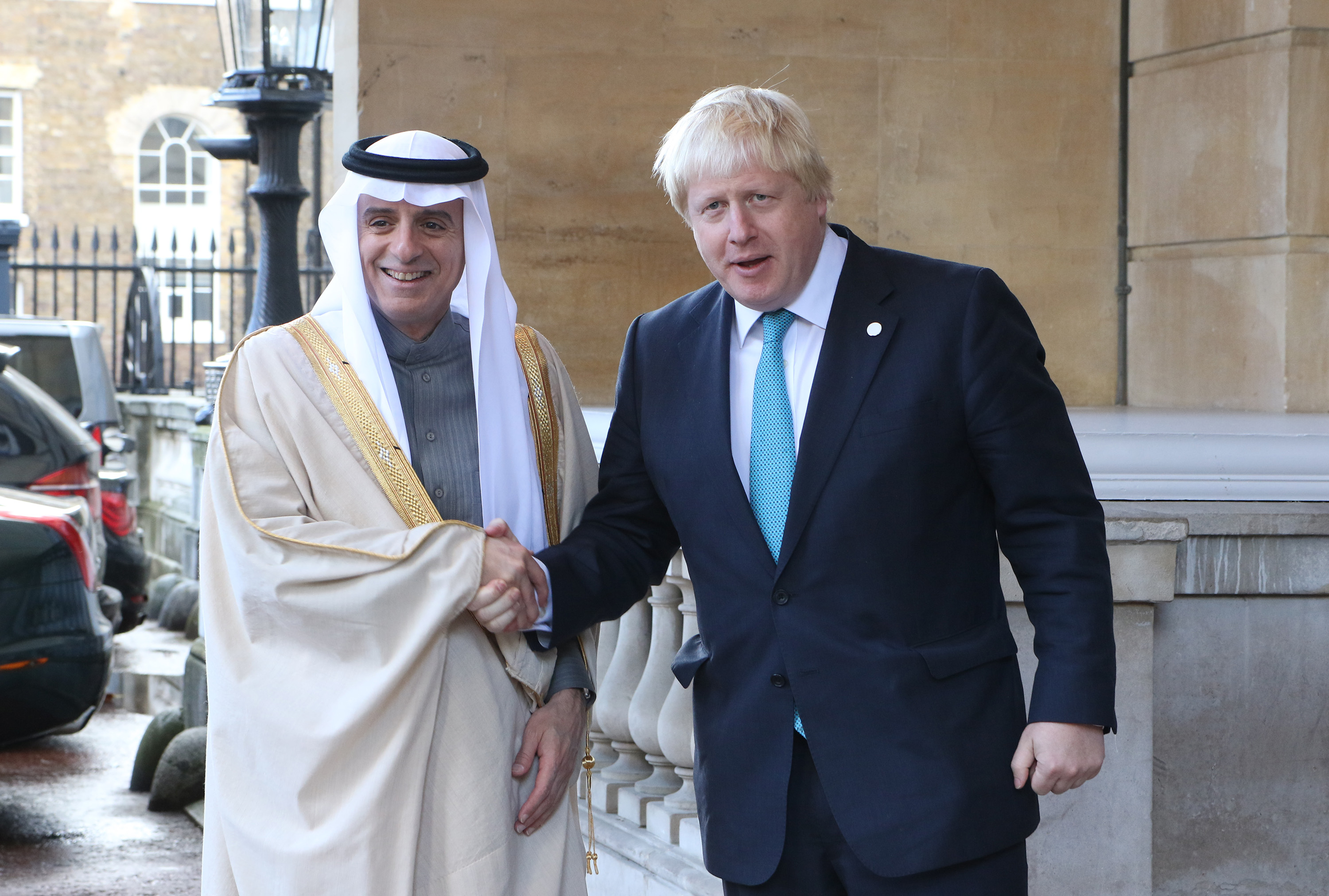
British Foreign Secretary Boris Johnson meets Saudi Arabian Foreign Minister Adel al-Jubeir

In December 2016, British government research revealed that British-made cluster bombs had been used by the Saudi-led coalition in Yemen. This was confirmed by the Saudi Arabian government in the same month. Cluster munitions (another term for cluster bombs) can lie unexploded for long periods of time and cause severe injury to civilians even years after the initial attack. It is illegal to use, produce, transfer or stockpile cluster bombs, since the coming into force of the UN Convention on Cluster Munition on 1 August 2010. This treaty is international law and although Saudi Arabia has neither signed nor ratified it, the UK ratified this treaty in 2010, meaning it is not only illegal for the UK to produce and transfer cluster bombs according to British as well as international law, but the country also has a duty to promote the aims and ratification of the treaty to non-signatory states.

In January 2017, Parliament debated a motion calling for an independent investigation into violations of International Humanitarian Law in Yemen. Incidents to be investigated include the bombing of a funeral which killed 140 people; the bombing of a refugee camp and eight bombings of densely populated areas in Sa'dah, Sana'a, Hodeidah, Hajjah and Ibb, which Amnesty International have raised concerns about.

In a 20 June 2019 judgment, the Court of Appeal ruled favouring the anti-arms trade campaigners in their legal campaign against the government over their arms sales to the Saudi government. The Campaign Against Arms Trade (CAAT) asserted that the arms sales made by the British government are being used by the Saudi-led coalition in their violations of international law. International trade secretary, Liam Fox, said that the government would challenge the judgment, but had adjourned any licences for the Saudi government and its partners in the coalition.

At the June 2019 G20 Summit held in Osaka, Japan, UK Prime Minister Theresa May urged the Crown Prince of the Kingdom of Saudi Arabia to collaborate with the United Nations to find a solution to the 4-year long conflict in Yemen.

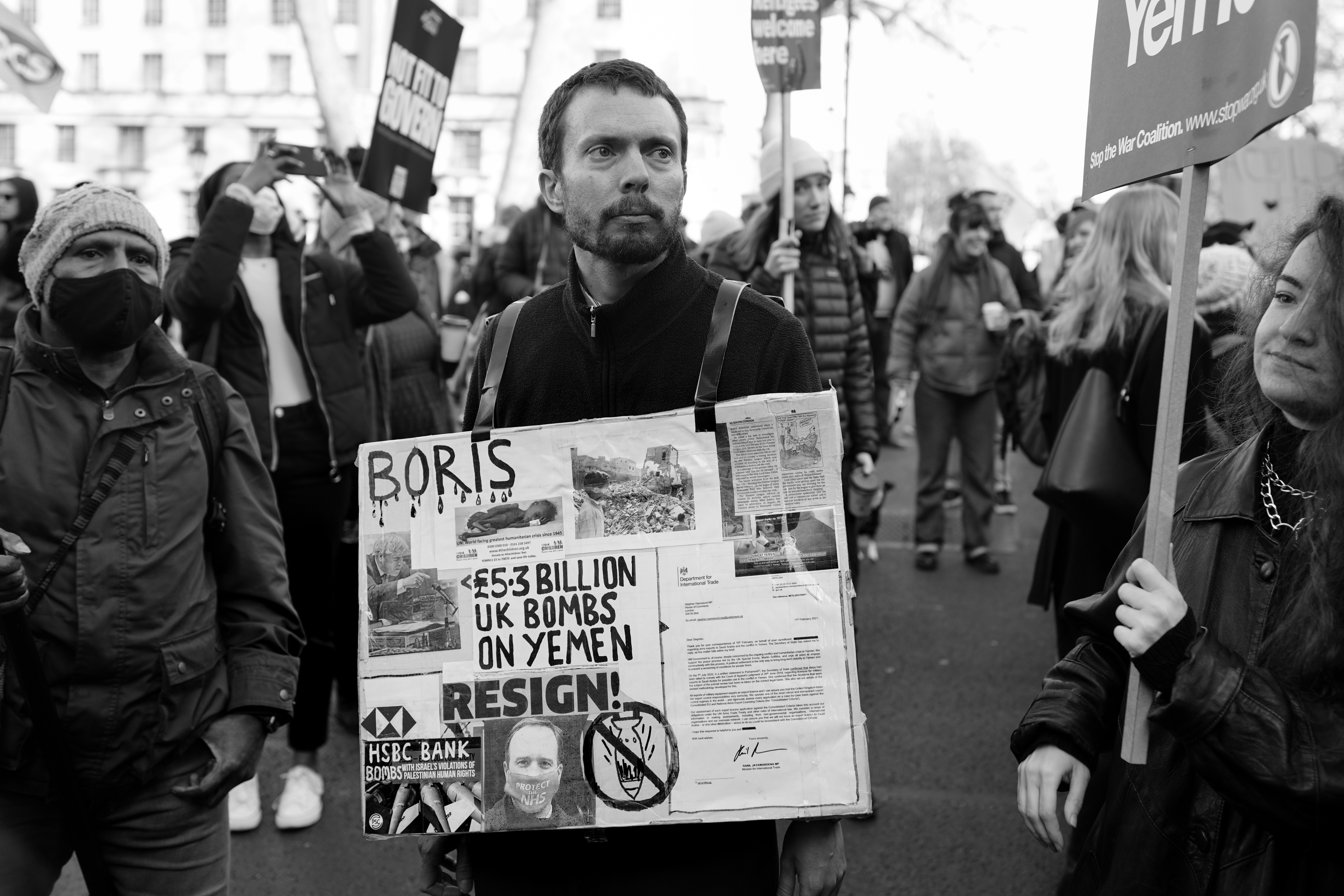
Protesters outside Downing Street highlighting the UK's complicity in Saudi Arabia's bombing campaign against Yemen

Labour Party leader, Jeremy Corbyn, claimed that the Prime Minister was not successful in signalling the UK government's disapproval of Saudi's role in Yemen war. He added, "She should confirm the UK government will immediately stop selling arms to his regime."

Andrew Smith, of Campaign Against Arms Trade (CAAT), said that Jeremy Hunt and Boris Johnson "have played an utterly central and complicit role in arming and supporting the Saudi-led destruction of Yemen." Jeremy Hunt's Conservative leadership campaign was partly funded by Ken Costa, investment banker with close ties to Saudi Arabia's Crown Prince.

=== Recent exchanges ===
In May 2021, the foreign ministries of Saudi Arabia and the UK met in London and discussed global issues and bilateral relations, as well as the issue of Palestine.

In October 2023, amid the Gaza war, British PM Rishi Sunak met with Crown Prince Mohammed bin Salman in Saudi Arabia. During the meeting, the Prime Minister encouraged bin Salman to leverage Saudi Arabia's leadership in the region to promote stability.

In early December 2024, British PM Keir Starmer conducted a multi-day diplomatic visit to the Gulf, meeting with Crown Prince Mohammed bin Salman in Saudi Arabia.

== Diplomatic relations ==
The UK has an embassy in Riyadh, consulate in Jeddah and trade office in Al Khobar. The current British ambassador to Saudi Arabia is Neil Crompton. Saudi Arabia has an embassy and consulate in London. Mohammed bin Nawwaf bin Abdulaziz was the Saudi ambassador to the UK between 2005 and 2019. He was replaced by Khalid bin Bandar Al Saud both of whom are the members of the House of Saud.

=== Death of King Abdullah ===
In January 2015, Prince Charles travelled to the Saudi capital Riyadh, as did a number of world leaders including Prime Minister David Cameron, to pay his respects following the death of the nation's King Abdullah. The decision following the King's death to fly flags at half-mast on key public buildings in London drew sharp criticism from some prominent politicians who highlighted claims of Saudi Arabia's abuses of free speech, women's rights and the country's role as a cradle of Islamist extremism.

== Economic relations ==
Economic relations between the United Kingdom and Saudi Arabia are primarily characterized by oil trade, arms exports, and mutual investments. Saudi Arabia is one of the most important buyers of British arms; the UK has been supplying the kingdom with large quantities of weapons and military technology since the 1960s. Overall, bilateral trade has increased significantly in recent years, with trade in goods (goods and services) amounting to around £18.5 billion in 2022/23. The UK mainly exports machinery, vehicles, pharmaceuticals, high-quality consumer goods, and services to Saudi Arabia, while petroleum, petrochemical products, metals, and plastics are among the most important Saudi Arabian exports to the UK. In 2022, Saudi Arabia was the UK's 21st largest trading partner, accounting for around 1.1% of total UK foreign trade.

The two countries also have close investment ties: Saudi Arabia's Public Investment Fund (PIF) has invested heavily in British companies and projects in recent years, including the acquisition of Premier League club Newcastle United in 2021. British companies are active in the Saudi energy sector, finance, and other industries. British authorities also welcome the economic reforms initiated by Crown Prince Mohammed bin Salman as part of "Vision 2030" and have sought to participate in the opportunities arising from these reforms. For example, London hoped to win the listing of a stake in the Saudi oil company Saudi Aramco on the London Stock Exchange (which ultimately did not happen).

Keir Starmer’s government has significantly expanded economic and military ties with Gulf Cooperation Council (GCC) nations, primarily focusing on securing infrastructure investment and finalizing a region-wide free trade agreement. Starmer defended the engagement with these leaders—despite human rights concerns—as necessary for both British security and jobs. Starmer identified economic growth (or wealth creation) as his "number one mission" during his official visit to Saudi Arabia in December 2024.

== Military relations ==
The UK's Ministry of Defence Saudi Armed Forces Project (MODSAP) supplies weapons and services to the Saudi Armed Forces under the Saudi British Defence Cooperation Programme (SBDCP) and the SALAM Project. MODSAP's principal roles are to monitor the progress and performance of the SBDCP and the Salam prime contractor, UK-headquartered arms company BAE Systems, so that the requirements of Saudi Arabia's armed forces are faithfully met.

The UK's Ministry of Defence also runs the Saudi Arabia National Guard Communications Project, which aims to improve the communication capabilities of Saudi Arabia's National Guard. The UK also runs a British Military Mission to the Saudi Arabian National Guard.

In 2021, the UK stated that it would not stop selling weapons to Saudi Arabia. In March 2022, Boris Johnson visited Saudi Arabia as "part of efforts to secure more oil supplies".

Saudi Arabia is pushing to join the Global Combat Air Programme a multinational initiative led by the United Kingdom, Japan, and Italy to develop a sixth-generation stealth fighter, with tentative British and Italian support. However, due to concerns surrounding defence export rules and extended negotiations, Japan currently opposes Saudi entry. The UK Ministry of Defence intends to review means of cooperation with Saudi Arabia, and understand the Saudi government's military and industrial objectives. This is predicted to be completed by March 2024.

In October 2026, the United Kingdom expanded its military support for Saudi Arabia in response to Houthi attacks. The assistance included Royal Air Force Typhoon fighters for defensive missions, an A400M transport aircraft, military advisers and an extension of air-to-air refuelling support for Saudi operations.

=== Al Salam arms deal ===
After two years of lobbying from the government and BAE Systems, in February 2014, British arms company BAE Systems agreed a deal to supply the Saudis with 72 Typhoon fighter jets, worth £4.4 billion (just over US$7 billion). This followed sustained pressure from the British government which involved, among numerous other things, British Crown Prince Charles performing a sword dance dressed in traditional Saudi ceremonial dress.

== Controversy ==
=== British parliamentary committee report on relations ===
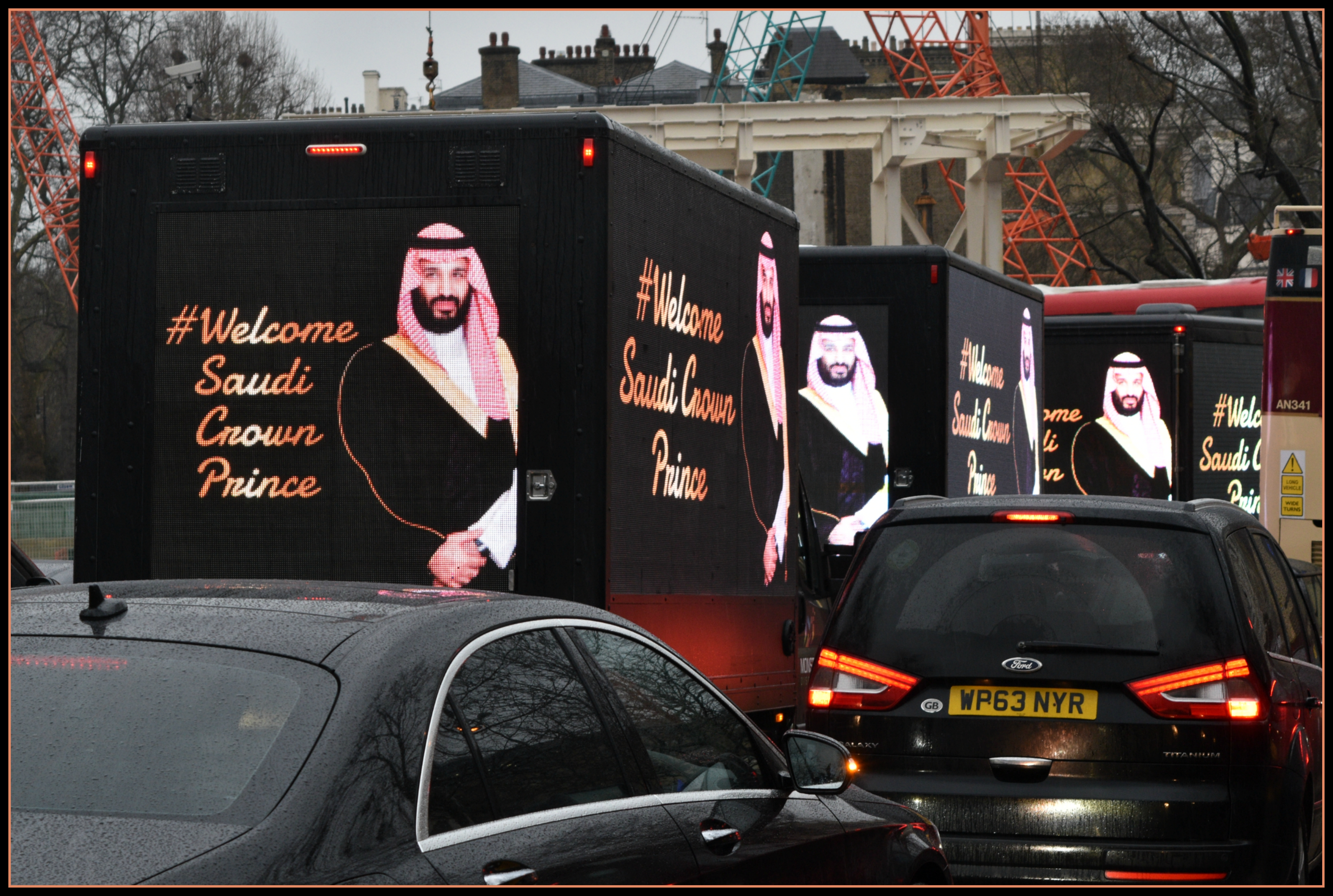
Saudi Arabia's Crown Prince Mohammed bin Salman's state visit to the United Kingdom in March 2018

In 2013, a UK parliamentary committee report was published, examining the UK's relationship with Saudi Arabia. The Saudi ambassador to the UK warned of negative consequences for bilateral relations when the parliamentary enquiry was announced in 2012.

MPs on the foreign affairs committee also asked the government to "assess" the supply of weapons by Saudi Arabia to Syrian rebels seeking to overthrow President Bashar al-Assad. However, the report found no "conclusive proof" that it has been used for internal repression, and said there would be "significant costs for the UK-Saudi relationship" by ending sales. MPs described Saudi Arabia as "part of the problem as well as part of the solution" in counter-terrorism co-operation. The government was urged to try to "improve the monitoring of the funding flowing from Saudi Arabia to organisations with an extremist message", and to ensure that its "legitimate promotion of religious values does not inadvertently contribute to the furtherance of extremism." It was also asked to give an "assessment of the situation and the actions it is taking to monitor Syrian rebel groups that are receiving funding and arms from Saudi Arabia, and its efforts to engage with the Saudi authorities regarding any concerns about them."

The foreign affairs committee report noted: "Democratic governments such as the UK face a challenge in trying to reconcile their liberal constituencies at home with the need to maintain relationships with undemocratic and conservative regimes that are important to their interests on a regional and global level." Another section asserted:

We understand that to encourage a government such as that of Saudi Arabia towards reform, a combination of private and public pressure is required. By their very nature, private conversations are difficult to explain publicly. However, we are particularly concerned that some witnesses not only disagreed with UK policy but appeared to disbelieve the government's account of its private conversations with Saudi Arabia on reform. The government appears to have a credibility problem and must do more to explain its policies and consider where it can point to specific progress as a result of its human rights work.

Richard Ottaway, the foreign affairs committee chairman, said:

The government is correct to focus on what is constructive and achievable by working with the leadership in both states, but it cannot simply ignore the charges of hypocrisy and criticism levelled against the UK. The Foreign and Commonwealth Office must find new ways to explain the UK's approach, to highlight its successes, and to present a more coherent strategy of engagement with these important allies.

A spokesperson for The Campaign Against the Arms Trade (CAAT) stated that "Unfortunately it looks as though arms company and establishment interests reached into the heart of this inquiry. The foreign affairs committee is giving cover to the UK government as it continues the policy of pandering to despicable regimes in its desire to drum up sales for [defence firm] BAE Systems." Ann Feltham from CAAT added that:

The problem is not that the UK government is failing to explain its approach to Saudi Arabia to the UK public; it is the approach itself that is the problem. The government needs to put human rights at the heart of its policy towards Saudi Arabia and Bahrain, not the interests of the arms companies. Otherwise it is a betrayal of those protesters who seek human rights and democratic freedoms.

=== Saudi crucifixion sentence for pro-democracy protester fallout ===
On 14 February 2012, a Saudi 70-year old called Ali Mohammed Baqir al-Nimr was arrested after taking part in anti-government rallies in Saudi Arabia. In 2014, he was sentenced to death and pro-Saudi government media reported that Nimr would be crucified.

In September 2015, Jeremy Corbyn, Britain's opposition leader, used his speech to Labour Party conference to call on Britain's Ministry of Justice to drop its bid for a £5.9 million Saudi prisons contract, partly because of Al-Nimr's imminent execution. The bid had been put in by Justice Solutions International, the commercial arms of the Ministry of Justice.

There was also controversy, among the British press and public, when the Saudis sentenced British pensioner Karl Andree to 350 lashes after he was arrested for transporting home-made wine in his car.

Saudi Arabia's ambassador to Britain, Prince Mohammed bin Nawaf bin Abdulaziz, wrote a response to Jeremy Corbyn's speech in Britain's Telegraph newspaper. In it, he accused Corbyn of disrespect and referred to the arrests and crucifixion sentences of pro-democracy activists and threats of lashing against a pensioner transporting wine in his car as "a number of domestic events in the Kingdom". "We will not be lectured to by anyone," he said.

Despite pressure from the Saudi governments and top figures in the British government like David Cameron and Philip Hammond, the justice secretary Michael Gove cancelled the contract in October 2015. However, the government did continue resisting pressure from human rights groups to stop licensing weapons exports to Saudi Arabia. Between October 2015 and September 2016, the British government licensed at least £544 million worth of military exports to Saudi Arabia including components for bombs, machine guns and sniper rifles.

According to the Telegraph, the UK's Foreign Office feared that Mohammed bin Nawaf was poised to react to the prisons contract cancellation by taking a temporary "leave of absence" while a wide-ranging review of relations with the UK was conducted. In order to repair the damage from these events, and to ensure the Saudis keep buying weapons from British-headquartered companies like BAE Systems, Foreign Secretary Philip Hammond travelled to Saudi Arabia on 27 October 2015. While there, he met with Saudi King Salman; interior minister and crown prince Mohammed Bin Naif; defence minister and deputy crown prince Mohammed bin Salman and the leader of Saudi Arabia's National Guard Prince Mutaib. Travelling with Hammond were Hugh Blackman, the commander of the British Military Mission to Saudi Arabia; Peter Drew, the programme director of the joint British and Saudi military programme 'Saudi-Arabia National Guard Communication project' and two British military attaches.

In the same month, the Prime Minister's chief of staff Edward Llewellyn, Baron Llewellyn of Steep visited Saudi King Salman in Riyadh in what the Telegraph called "a secret diplomatic offensive with Saudi Arabia after row".

=== Human rights abuses ===
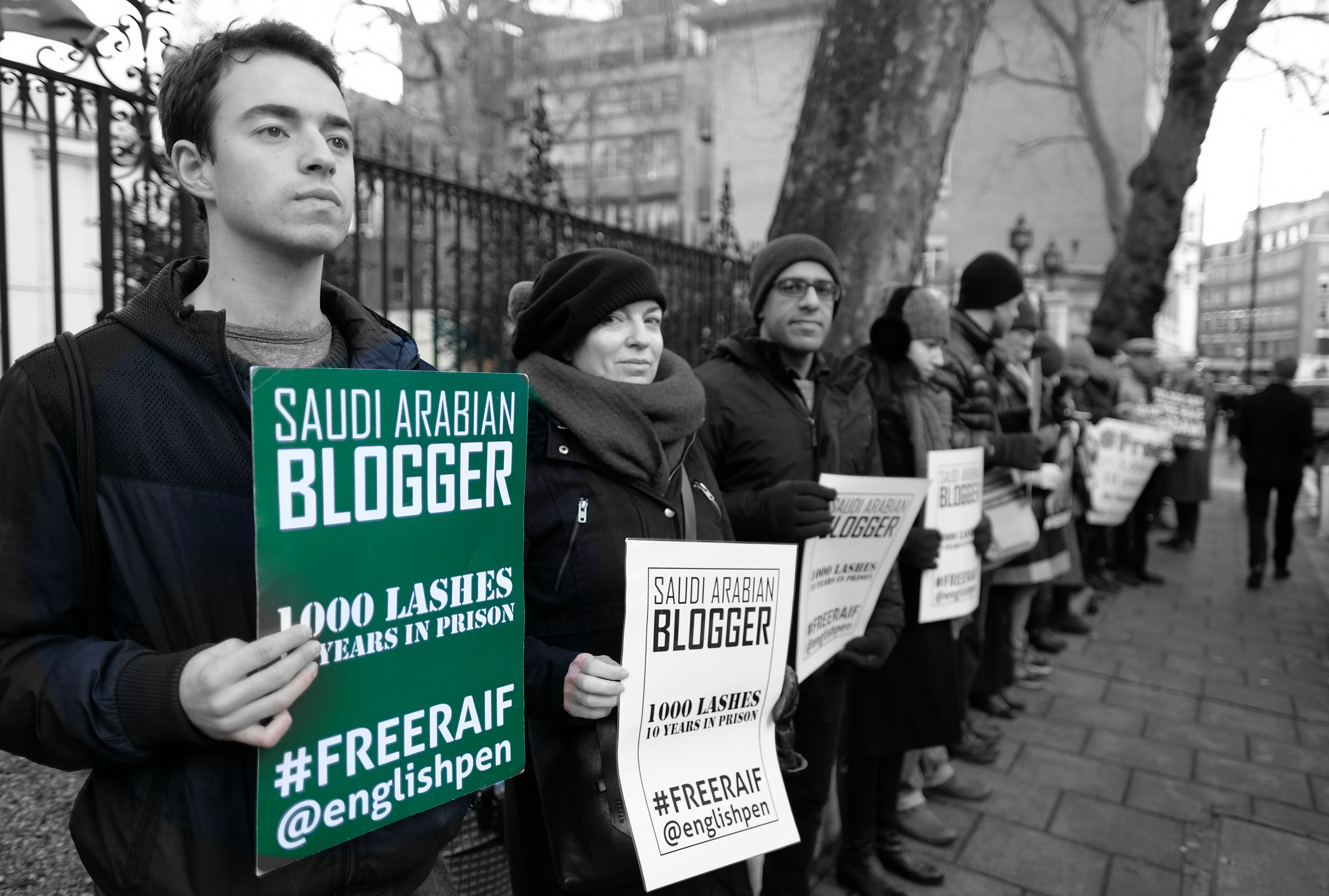
A protest outside the Saudi Arabian Embassy in London, 13 January 2017

In February 2015, Prince Charles visited Saudi Arabia, at the request of the British Government because of his close ties to the Saudi royal family, and he was accompanied by senior Foreign Office officials. According to a Telegraph source, Charles raised the case of Raif Badawi, a pro-democracy blogger who had been flogged in public a month before. The Telegraph source said the Prince received a "friendly response" from Saudi royals. Badawi remained in prison and his supporters fear he could be publicly flogged again at any time.

In October 2018, Saudi journalist Jamal Khashoggi, a columnist for The Washington Post, went missing from the Saudi consulate in Istanbul. The Turkish authorities accused the Saudi government of murdering and dismembering the 59-year old journalist. Khashoggi was a critic of crown prince Mohammad bin Salman and was living in exile in the United States from the past one year. Saudi denied the allegations. Amidst the controversy, Jeremy Hunt asked Saudi Arabia to urgently explain the disappearance of Khashoggi. In a phone call to Adel al-Jubeir, Hunt warned that "friendships depend on shared values".

After Saudi Arabia accepted to have killed Khashoggi inside the Saudi consulate in Turkey, Theresa May vowed to not let any suspect involved in the murder enter the UK in future. She said if any suspect had a British visa, it would be revoked.

On 12 November 2018, the UK Foreign Secretary, Jeremy Hunt flew to Saudi Arabia to request Mohammad bin Salman's cooperation with the Turkish authorities into the murder of Jamal Khashoggi. Hunt said, "It is clearly unacceptable that the full circumstances behind his murder still remain unclear. We encourage the Saudi authorities to cooperate fully with the Turkish investigation into his death, so that we deliver justice for his family and the watching world. The international community remains united in horror and outrage at the brutal murder of Jamal Khashoggi one month ago."

The Prime Minister of the United Kingdom, Theresa May, during her 20-minute meeting with the crown prince of Saudi Arabia, Mohammed bin Salman, at the 2019 G20 Summit addressed the need for maintaining transparency in the Jamal Khashoggi murder legal process.

In 2010, a Saudi Prince was jailed after he abused his workers. He thought that he could get away with it. He was later sent back to Saudi Arabia.

In 2012, a Saudi Princess, Sara Bin Talal Al Saud, applied for asylum in the UK. She claims that she faced a lot of abuse in Saudi Arabia.

== Resident diplomatic missions ==
- Saudi Arabia has an embassy in London.
- The United Kingdom has an embassy in Riyadh and a consulate-general in Jeddah.

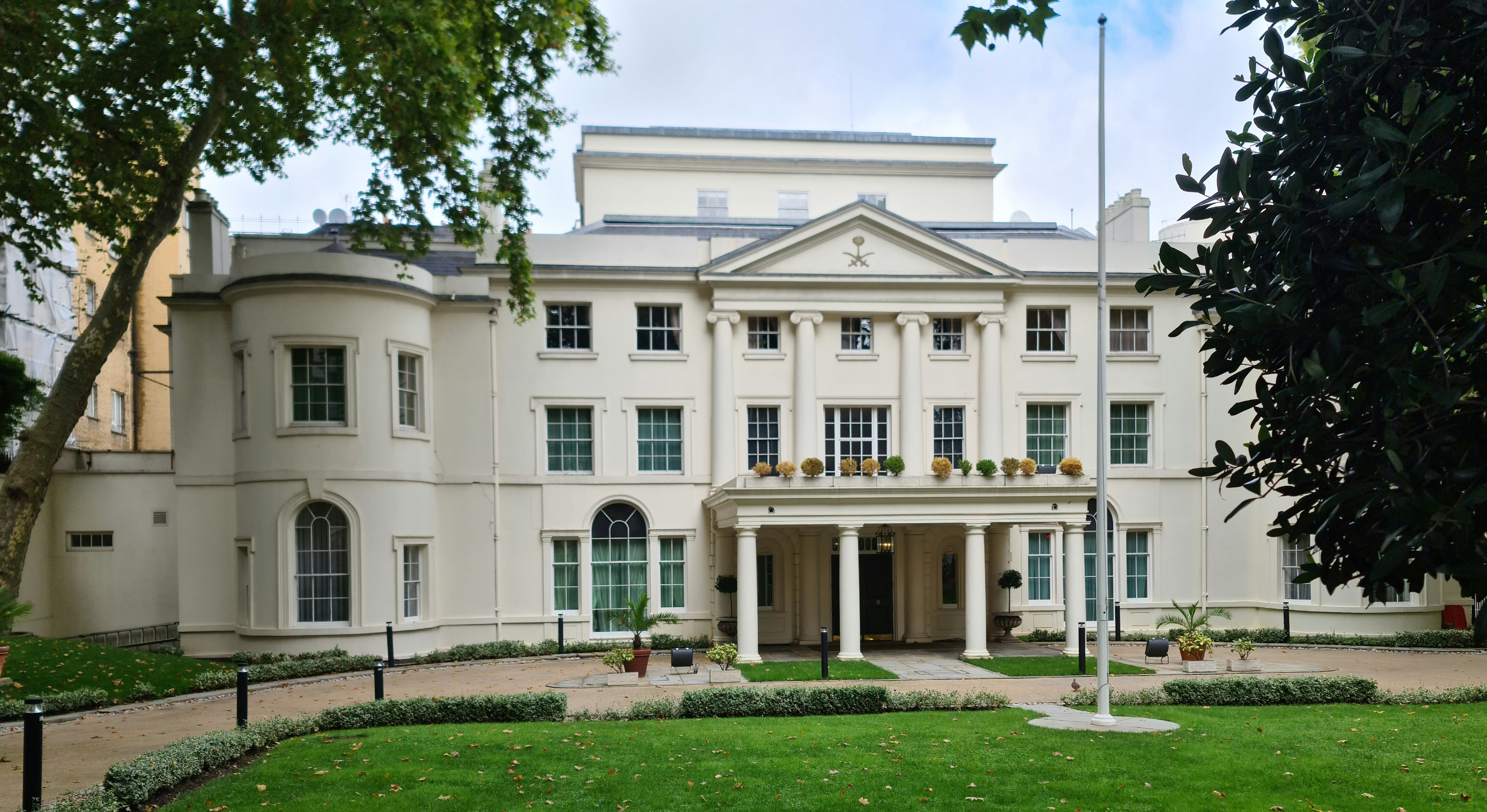
Embassy of Saudi Arabia in London

== See also ==
- Foreign relations of Saudi Arabia
- Foreign relations of the United Kingdom
- List of Ambassadors of the United Kingdom to Saudi Arabia
- Operation Granby
