= St James Holdings =

British sports team holding company

- Company type: Limited company
- Industry: Sports club holding company
- Founded: 2006
- Founder: Mike Ashley
- Defunct: 2021
- Fate: Newcastle United sold to a consortium consisting of PCP Capital Partners, Reuben Brothers and the Public Investment Fund
- Headquarters: Newcastle upon Tyne, United Kingdom
- Products: Newcastle United
- Owner: Mike Ashley
- Divisions: NUFC.co.uk; St. James' Park
- Subsidiaries: Newcastle United; Newcastle United W.F.C.
- Website: www.nufc.co.uk

St James Holdings Limited was a company set up by tycoon Mike Ashley, specifically to acquire shares of Newcastle United Football Club during his 2007 takeover. The company name was a reference to St. James' Park, the stadium of Newcastle United.

In 2021 company sold its holding in the club to a consortium consisting of PCP Capital Partners, Reuben Brothers and the Public Investment Fund of Saudi Arabia (PIF).

== 2007 – Newcastle United takeover bid ==
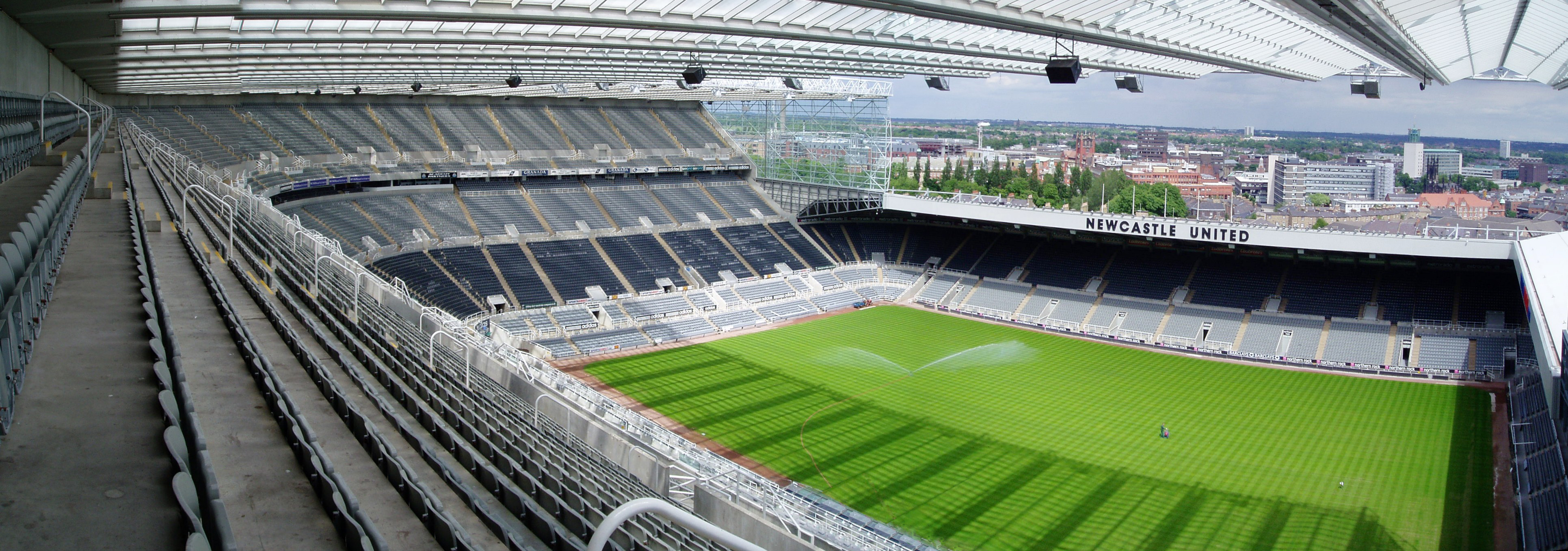
St James' Park, namesake of the company.

23 May

On 23 May 2007 English businessman Mike Ashley bought Sir John Hall's stake in Newcastle United F.C of 41.6% for £55,342,223, valuing the club at £132,810,710.35, he then launched a formal takeover bid at 100p per share. This was a 14% rise on the price at closing on the London Stock Exchange the day before. Chairman Freddy Shepherd, who was in hospital at the time of the bid suffering from a punctured lung, said that he planned to fight the takeover and not allow Mike Ashley to get his hands on his 29.8%.

Under the terms of UK takeover law, having purchased more than 30% of a listed company, he was obliged to make an offer to buy the remaining shares at the same or a greater price.

31 May

On 31 May it was reported that the Newcastle board were considering Ashley's offer. It is widely believed that Mike Ashley then owned around a 54% stake in the club meaning that Freddy Shepherd's 29.8% was then useless and he could have been removed from his position as chairman by the new majority shareholders.

7 June

On the 7 June 2007 Freddy Shepherd and Shepherd Offshore Services Ltd. agreed to sell their stake in Newcastle United and released a statement urging other shareholders to do the same. It was announced that Shepherd would remain in the role of chairman.

15 June

Confirmation came on the 15 June that Mike Ashley and St. James' Holdings had acquired slightly over 77% of the club. This means that Mike Ashley could delist the company from the stock exchange, with the date of 18 July being mentioned in the release.

26 June

On 26 June 2007, Ashley gained the 90% of shares needed to compulsorily acquire the final 10% of shares. On the same day, directors Bruce Shepherd, Allison Antonopoulos, Tim Revill and Douglas Hall formally resigned from the board and both Chris Mort and Steve Hayward were appointed.

18 July

On 18 July 2007, the shares of Newcastle United PLC were delisted from the London Stock Exchange.

== 2008 – Possible sale ==
In September 2008 the club manager Kevin Keegan (who had been appointed in January) left the club. The European style of management introduced by the Ashley regime was cited as the reason for his departure. The fans of the club began to protest outside St. James' Park and the players' performance suffered. This pressure led to Mike Ashley releasing a statement and putting the club up for sale. The London-based investment bank Seymour Pierce was appointed to handle the sale of the club.

On 28 December the sale was called off.

== 2009/10 – Relegation and Promotion ==
After Newcastle United were relegated from the Premier League to the Championship on 24 May 2009, it is likely that the club will be sold. According to media reports on 31 May 2009, Ashley is attempting to sell the club again. The lowered asking price due to the relegation was £100 million.

On 27 October the sale was again called off. At the same time Ashley decided to sell the naming rights to St. James' Park - namesake of the holding company. This again angered fans. In April 2010 it was confirmed that the club was to return to the Premier League; this is likely to increase the value of the club once again. The club was reportedly up for sale for periods of time over the following years.

== 2021 – Sale of the club ==
In 2020 Ashley agreed to sell the club to a consortium consisting of PCP Capital Partners, Reuben Brothers and the Public Investment Fund of Saudi Arabia (PIF). However, the sale was blocked until over a year later, and was finally completed on 7 October 2021, selling the club for £305 million.
