= Dinenage =

Dinenage is a surname. Notable people with the surname include:

- Caroline Dinenage (born 1971), English politician
- Fred Dinenage (born 1942), English television presenter, broadcaster, and author

== See also ==
- Dinnage
