= Newcastle United Supporters Trust =

Supporters' trust

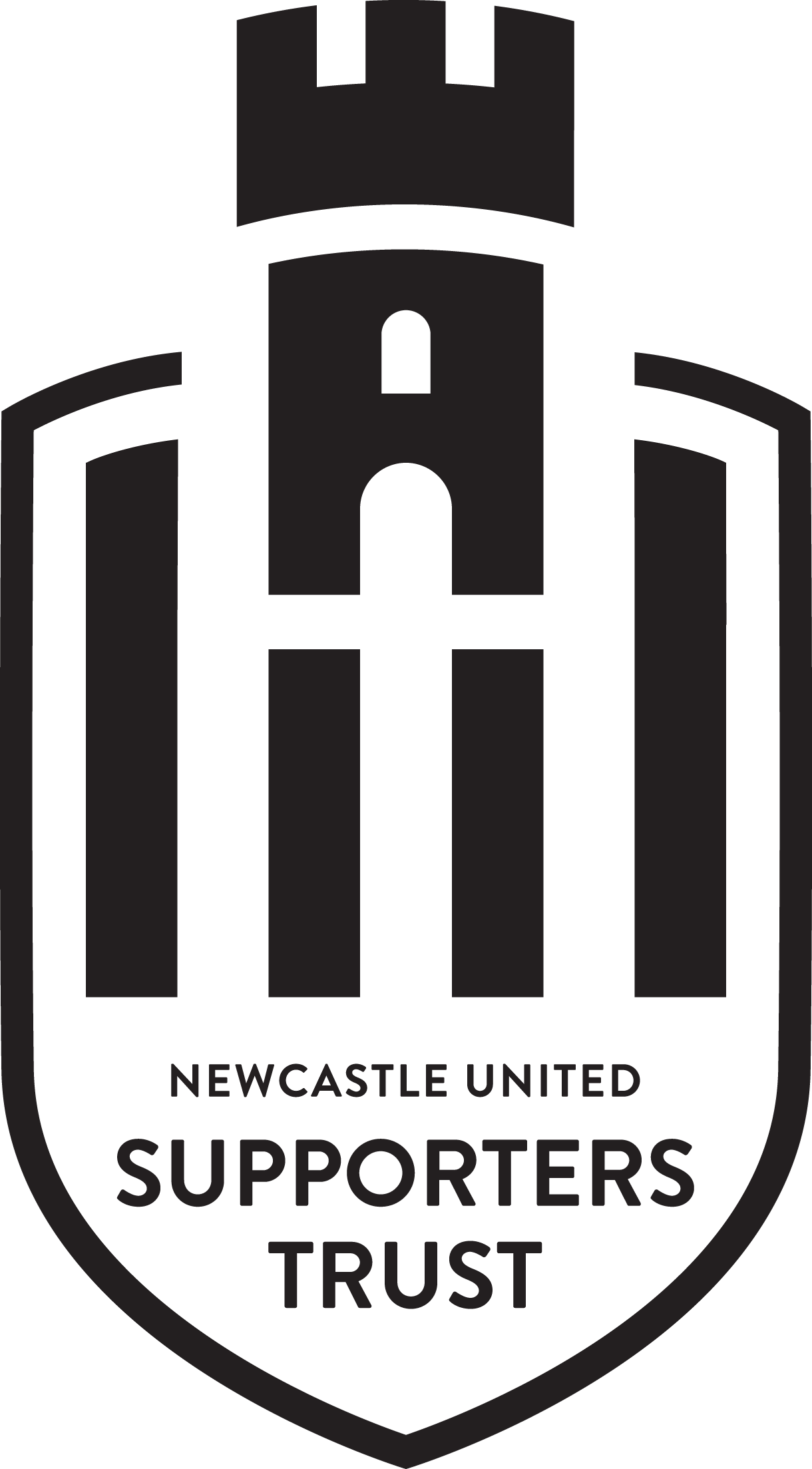
- NUST logo
- Abbreviation: NUST
- Formation: 18 September 2008 (as Newcastle United Supporters Club - NUSC)
- Type: Supporter's Trust
- Legal status: Constitutional Supporters' trust
- Purpose: To represent the interests of and provide a voice for the fans of Newcastle United F.C.
- Headquarters: Newcastle upon Tyne
- Members: Over 11,000 members in 35 countries
- Board of directors: Chair - Lisa Mole Vice Chair - Felicity Thow Board Members - Paul Karter, Cliff Culley, Pete Davey, Kevin Patterson, Olivia Thomson, Karl Williamson, Justin Robert, Steve Henderson, Tom Rutherford and David Stonehouse Board Secretary - Colin Whittle Digital Secretary - Chris Johnson.
- Main organ: Interim Committee
- Affiliations: Football Supporters' Federation, Supporters Direct, Football Supporters' Association, The Premier League

The Newcastle United Supporters Trust, or the NUST, is a supporters' trust consisting of fans of Newcastle United (NUFC), an English football club. The prime role of the group is to "represent the interests of and provide a voice for the fans of Newcastle United". The group was set up as an initiative by the fanzines True Faith and The Mag, and the fan website NUFC.com, aiming to be independent of but maintain a working relationship with the owners of the football club. A later stated aim was to achieve stakeholder representation on the board of the football club.

== Background ==
The group was formed in September 2008 as the Newcastle United Supporters Club (NUSC), following on from minor fan demonstrations against the NUFC board and club owner Mike Ashley after the shock resignation of manager Kevin Keegan, culminating in a long and emotional statement from Ashley on 14 September announcing he intended to sell NUFC, stating that he had listened to the fans who "want him out". A backdrop to the demonstrations was a general feeling of disorganisation through lack of a common voice, resulting in various competing and conflicting ideas of how to protest against the club. Fans also sought an outlet to offence felt by the insinuation by Ashley in his official statement that he or his family would be assaulted if he attended a game, and that the fans demanded unrealistic Galactico signings. Fans were also seeking to correct the perceived inaccurate and stereotypical depiction of their aims and intentions by sections of the national media, such as unrealistic expectations and demands while claiming to be working towards a seat on the board.

== History ==
=== Formation ===
The day after Ashley's statement on 15 September 2008 a press release from True Faith and The Mag announced a public meeting would be held on the night of 16 September 2008 to judge support for a proposed new supporter's group, initially identified as the Newcastle United Supporters Group.

The release stated that while the continuation of the protest against the Ashley regime would be the initial focus of the group, the group was also intended to be a long term initiative, and the proposed group would be "energetic, intelligent and responsibly represent the broad church of Newcastle United's support". The group would through an inclusive mass membership attempt to be the legitimate voice of the supporters of NUFC, something which neither supporting fanzines, despite earlier releasing a joint statement over the desired form of the Ashley protest, had "never claimed to be".

The meeting was held in the Tyneside Irish Centre opposite the Gallowgate End of St James' Park, home stadium of NUFC, attended by a "few hundred" fans. The meeting sought comments from the floor, and was attended by an invited speakers panel made up of John Gibson, Malcolm Dix and Colin Whittle.

Sports writer John Gibson was a veteran reporter for the Evening Chronicle. NUFC honorary life vice-president Malcolm Dix had formed the Magpie Group to take over NUFC in 1987 with Sir John Hall, eventually succeeding in 1993. Dix had also formed the Newcastle Supporters Association in 1977, which folded in 1984, as well as editing an early fanzine The Supporter. Solicitor Colin Whittle was involved with the Save Our Seats campaign, a dispute in the late 1990s between fans and NUFC over seat ownership at St James' Park.

Following the initial public meeting, a further private meeting was held on 18 September 2008, at which an interim committee was established. NUSC made their first official statement through this committee on 19 September 2008 on a newly launched website, which also contained a registration form for prospective members to register their interest in the group. In the statement, NUSC expressed the feeling that for progress to be made, the club should be sold at the "earliest possible opportunity".

=== December 2008 ===
On 28 November 2008, interim team manager Joe Kinnear's contract was converted from a monthly rolling contract to a permanent one running until the end of the 2008/9 season. On 2 December 2008, in reaction to this news indicating the club might not be sold until the end of the year, the NUSC called for a truce, and while affirming the main aim was to still see the club sold, it speculated that if that did not happen, and Mike Ashley were to publicly apologise for mistakes made, that he might be given a second chance to run the club. Although at that time, the NUSC had so far not been able to open a dialogue with senior figures at the club.

At the same time, the NUSC website was updated with a countdown timer alongside an article addressed to Mike Ashley, Derek Llambias and Dennis Wise, which contained a list of potential problems that Ashley and the club would face if immediate and substantial investments were not made towards the first team playing squad during the January transfer window.

NUSC also published a "NUFC Christmas Tale" on their website, which was a satirical poem about Mike Ashley and his "Cockney Mafia".

The 28 December 2008 match at St James' Park between Newcastle and Liverpool was designated Bobby Robson day by the NUSC, celebrating the man and raising funds for the Sir Bobby Robson Foundation.

On the same day, Mike Ashley announced he had decided not to sell NUFC, and had taken it off the market. The timing of this announcement was criticised by the NUSC as hijacking the tribute to Bobby Robson

=== February 2009 ===
On 4 February 2009, the NUSC announced their intention to stage a protest rally at Grey's Monument directly before Newcastle United's home game against Everton FC on 22 February 2009.

The protest rally was given the go-ahead by Northumbria Police and a schedule was released a few days before the event was due to take place. There was no explanation from NUSC as to what had caused the delay between the announcement of the rally and clarification of what was due to take place.

Despite this uncertainty, the rally went ahead at Grey's Monument which had been draped in a "Ashley - Wise Out!!" banner along with "NUSC - change".

Several members of NUSC took the opportunity to talk to the varying crowd, estimated as being around 200–300 at any given point, interspersed with local entertainment.

=== March 2009 ===
The NUSC announced their intention to change their status to that of a Supporters' trust, the details of which were discussed in a public meeting on Thursday 19 March 2009 at the Tyneside Irish Centre, with speakers from Supporters Direct, the Lincoln City Supporters Trust, along with other notable Newcastle United related figures, who related their experiences of Supporters' Trusts.

On 26 March 2009 NUSC released a press statement entitled "All Together Now" as a rallying cry for supporters to get behind the team in an effort to stave off the immediate threat of relegation from the FA Premier League.

=== April/May 2009 ===
Following the appointment of Alan Shearer as caretaker manager until the end of the season, the local paper, the Evening Chronicle gave its support to the slightly renamed "Al-Together Now" campaign.

Prior to Shearer's first game in charge, against Chelsea on 4 April, the NUSC staged a balloon release. Following this, the club agreed to provide Flags and scarves at the last three home games of the season in order to generate a better atmosphere. However, after providing flags for the home game against Middlesbrough, the club decided not to provide any flags or scarves for the final home fixture against Fulham.

=== June/July 2009 ===
Having received backing from Supporters Direct, NUSC worked over the summer in the transfer of status to a Supporters Trust. This was officially achieved in July 2009, and resulted in a slight name change to Newcastle United Supporters Trust (NUST).

=== Official launch ===
NUST was officially launched in October 2009 at Newcastle Civic Centre. The trust produced its "More than a Trust" document, outlining NUST's vision "to engage with the owners of Newcastle United..., the community the club serves, and ultimately to have supporters representation on the board."

== Structure ==
=== Governance ===
It was decided that the initial NUSC interim committee would remain in place until June 2009, at which point, elections would be held on a one member, one vote basis. However, the elections were postponed until early 2010, due to the transfer in status to a Supporters Trust and to allow the trust to work with Supporters Direct to ensure that the elections meet their requirements. The NUST committee incorporates representation with the Football Supporters' Federation (FSF). NUST is a recognised Supporters' trust, with a constitution matching that of a Supporters' trust

=== Funding ===
Joining NUST costs £1 initial joining fee and £1 per year. Every penny from members' fees is invested back into NUST to cover the necessary expenses. By contributing to the Newcastle United Supporters Trust, the members play a crucial role in supporting the ongoing running of the organisation. NUST Board members volunteer their time without any claim for expenses or payment, there are some unavoidable costs associated with running the organisation efficiently. These include fees for essential services such as admin platforms, accountancy, website hosting, elections and PayPal transactions

== Achievements ==
=== Roadshows ===
NUST holds regular meetings in pubs and social clubs throughout the North East of England. The meetings are open to both NUST members and non-members and allow committee members to inform and update Newcastle United supporters with the latest trust developments. The roadshows are also partly social events with quizzes and regular guest speakers, ex-Newcastle player John Anderson and local journalist, John Gibson of the Evening Chronicle.

=== Local Achievers ===
In October 2009, NUST launched its 'Local Achievers' scheme, in conjunction with the Evening Chronicle. The scheme rewards people in the local community, who have been nominated by Newcastle fans with tickets to Newcastle United home games. Examples of local achievers include three teenagers who formed their own junior Newcastle United supporters club, charity fundraisers, and a youth football coach.

=== Newsletters ===
Trust members now receive a monthly newsletter via email updating them with the main news concerning the trust.

== Yes We Can! campaign ==
On 10 November 2009, NUST launched a campaign to buy Newcastle United on NewcastleGateshead Quayside. The campaign aims to raise the money via pledges both fans and local businesses. Initially, the campaign is aimed at investors with either a minimum of £1,500 cash, or a Self-invested personal pension at a minimum transfer of £25,000, with each investor entitled to one vote, regardless of the amount invested.

== 1892 Pledge Scheme - 2021 ==
Prior to the takeover of NUFC in October 2021, NUST members raised £200,000 with a view to fans owning a portion of shares in the club. After the takeover, 97.5% of NUST’s members voted in favour of donating this money to local charities.

In 2023, the money was allocated and donated as follows:

The Alan Shearer Foundation - £83,500

The Sir Bobby Robson Foundation - £59,000

Newcastle United Foundation - £30,000

Newcastle Foodbank - £27,500

== See also ==
- Newcastle United Independent Supporters Association
- Football in England
