= Kevin Beeston =

English businessman

- Born: Kevin Stanley Beeston
- Occupation: Chairman of Elysium Healthcare Limited

Kevin Stanley Beeston FCMA is chairman of Elysium Healthcare Limited, Senior Independent Director of Severn Trent plc, and a director of the Premier League.

== Career ==
He has also held non-executive positions with industry bodies such as the CBI, Chartered Management Institute and Business in the Community.

Beeston served as chairman of Serco Group plc until 2010 following a 25-year career with Serco including the roles of chairman since 2002 and previously chief executive and finance director. Other previous roles include chairman of Tylor Wimpey plc, chairman of Equiniti Group plc, chairman of Domestic and General Limited, chairman of Partnerships in Care, a non-executive director of IMI plc and Marston and a director of Ipswich Town Football Club.
