= Amanda Staveley =

British businesswoman (born 1973)

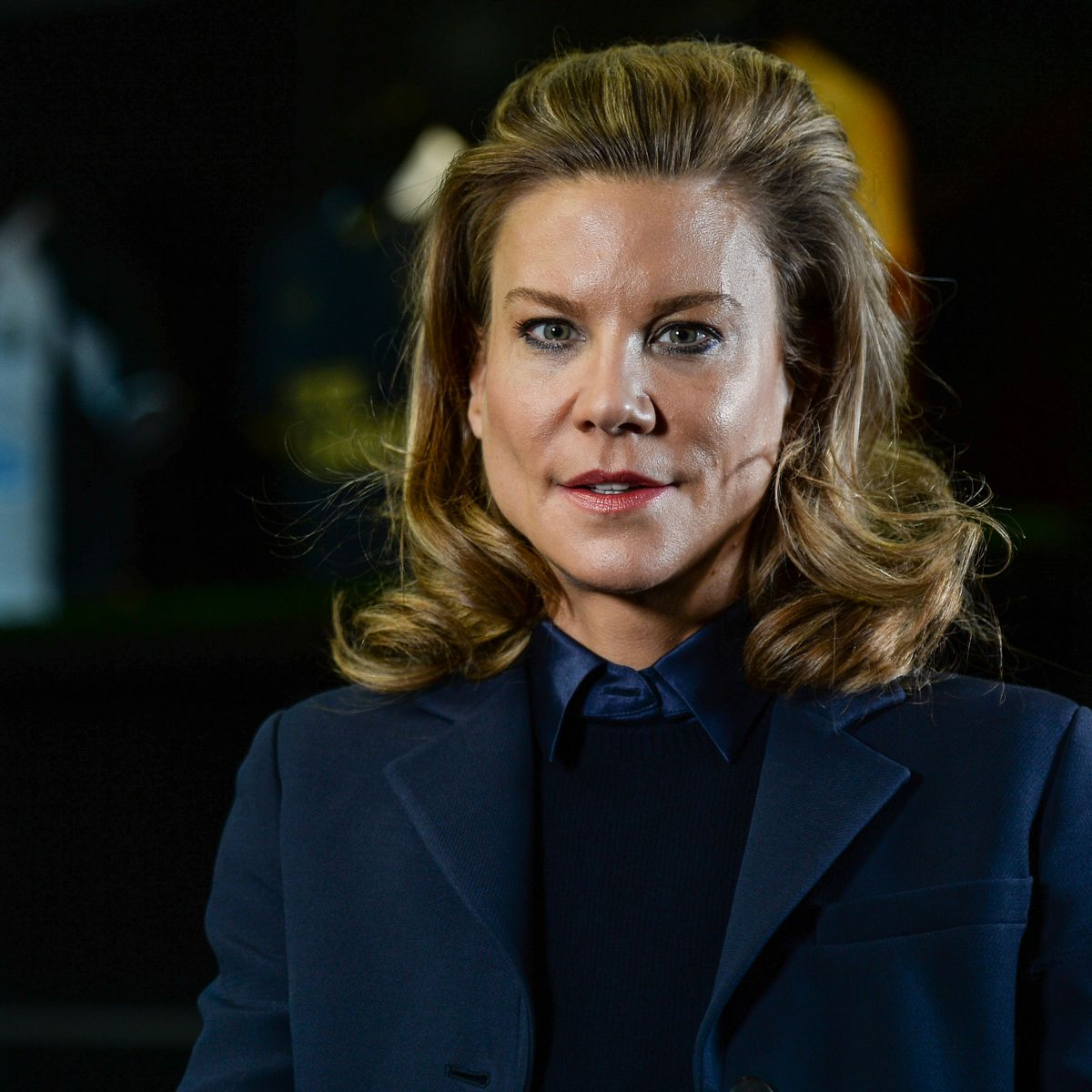
- Staveley in 2021

Former Director of Newcastle United
- In office 7 October 2021 – 12 July 2024 Serving with Yasir Al-Rumayyan and Jamie Reuben
- Chairman: Yasir Al-Rumayyan
- Preceded by: Mike Ashley
- Succeeded by: Reuben Brothers

Director of PCP Capital Partners
- Incumbent
- Assumed office 2008 Serving with Mehrdad Ghodoussi

Personal details
- Born: Amanda Staveley; 11 April 1973 (age 53) Ripon, England
- Spouse: Mehrdad Ghodoussi (m. 2011)
- Occupation: Financier

Amanda Louise Staveley (born 11 April 1973) is a British business executive. She is notable chiefly for her connections with Middle Eastern investors. She helped lead the Saudi consortium take over of Newcastle United. A deal that was completed in October 2021. As of July 12, 2024, Staveley left her role as Director for Newcastle United.

In 2008, Staveley played a prominent role in the investment of £7.3 billion in Barclays by the ruling families of Abu Dhabi and Qatar, and by the Qatari sovereign wealth fund.

Staveley's firm, PCP Capital Partners, acted for Sheikh Mansour Bin Zayed Al Nahyan of the Abu Dhabi royal family, who invested £3.5 billion to control 16 percent of the bank. The deal was reported to have earned PCP Capital Partners a commission of £110 million, which, after paying advisers, represented a profit of £40 million. Staveley was also involved in Mansour's high-profile purchase of Manchester City in September 2008.

Staveley has also attempted on two occasions to buy a stake in Newcastle United, first in 2017 and again in 2020 as part of a group led by Saudi Arabia's sovereign wealth fund, the Public Investment Fund. The takeover was completed on 7 October 2021, with Staveley owning 10% of the club, the Reuben Brothers owning 10% and Public Investment Fund (PIF), Saudi Arabia's sovereign wealth fund, owning 80%.

== Early life and education ==
Staveley was born near Ripon in Yorkshire. She is the daughter of Robert Staveley, a North Yorkshire landowner who founded the Lightwater Valley theme park, where Staveley waitressed as a child; her mother, Lynne, was an occasional model and champion showjumper.

Staveley was educated at Queen Margaret's School, York. As a child, she competed in showjumping and athletics. At the age of 16, Staveley left school and enrolled at a crammer, winning a place to read modern languages at St Catharine's College, Cambridge. As a student, she supplemented her income by working as a model. Staveley abandoned her degree after suffering from stress following the death of her grandfather.

== Business career ==
=== Early career and creation of Q.ton ===
In 1996, Staveley borrowed £180,000 and bought the restaurant, Stocks, in Bottisham between Cambridge and Newmarket. Through the restaurant, Staveley came to know members of Newmarket's racing community, in particular those associated with the Godolphin Racing stables owned by the Al Maktoum family of Dubai, as well as people from Cambridge's high-tech businesses. Through the late 1990s she started dealing in shares and became an active angel investor, especially in dot com enterprises and biotech firms such as Futura Medical.

Staveley closed Stocks and in 2000 opened Q.ton, a £10 million conference centre and facility developed in a joint venture with Trinity College, Cambridge on Cambridge Science Park. Investors in Q.ton were believed to include King Abdullah of Jordan.

=== Q.ton and EuroTelecom ===
In 2000, Staveley sold a 49 per cent share in Q.ton to the telecoms company EuroTelecom for £2 million. Staveley joined the firm as a non-executive director. A few months later, EuroTelecom went out of business in the collapse of the dotcom boom. At the time, it was claimed that Q.ton owed EuroTelecom £835,000 and that Staveley had agreed to buy back the company's stake, only for the money not to be forthcoming. Staveley denied having agreed to any payments and hired Kroll Inc. to investigate the members of the EuroTelecom board.

Staveley bought EuroTelecom's stake in Q.ton from the firm's administrator PricewaterhouseCoopers, a deal that led to a discontinued petition of bankruptcy against her when payment was delayed. She began raising £35 million from private investors to roll out the Q.ton concept throughout the UK and Europe. However, the company failed. Staveley agreed an Individual Voluntary Arrangement and in 2008 was paying back her creditors, including Barclays.

=== PCP Capital Partners ===
==== Background ====
After the failure of Q.ton, Staveley moved to Dubai, cultivating connections centred on Abu Dhabi, but extending across the Middle East.

In 2008, the Financial Times described her firm, PCP Capital Partners, as really amounting to Staveley and her legal partner, Craig Eadie, and explained that, although based in Mayfair, London, the company acts "via offshore private equity affiliates" as a vehicle for the investment of Middle Eastern money, with Staveley acting as an adviser on those deals.

==== Barclays ====
These contacts brought Staveley to a new level of prominence at the end of 2008 with the investment of Middle Eastern funds in Barclays as the bank sought to recapitalise by raising money privately rather than accept a bail-out from the British government after the 2008 financial crisis. Staveley earned a fee of £30 million for her role in the transaction. In 2010, The Daily Telegraph reported that Mansour's disposal of his stake in Barclays had made him a profit of about £2.25 billion.

On 8 June 2020, Staveley's firm filed a £1.5 billion lawsuit against Barclays, claiming that the bank offered her client, Abu Dhabi, "manifestly worse" terms than those offered to Qatar. The Barclays legal team claimed that Staveley inserted herself into the capital raising while Staveley countered that the PCP was not a "facilitator" as Barclays claimed, but rather led the investment syndicate. A judgement was reached in February 2021 with Staveley losing the case despite the judge ruling that the bank was "guilty of serious deceit" towards PCP Capital Partners. Judge Waksman’s ruling described Staveley’s deal for Sheikh Mansour as "excellent" and found that Barclays had made false representations to PCP, but dismissed PCP’s claim to compensation. In March 2021, Waksman ruled that Barclays was responsible for its own legal costs as the bank had made a "financial benefit as a result of its fraud". In April 2021, Staveley launched an appeal against the verdict, which she lost in June 2021.

==== Manchester City and Liverpool ====
The Barclays deal followed Sheikh Mansour's £210 million purchase of Manchester City in September of the same year through the Abu Dhabi United Group, a transaction reportedly worth £10 million in commission to PCP Capital Partners. At the same time Staveley was involved in extended negotiations by Sheikh Mohammed bin Rashid Al Maktoum's Dubai International Capital to buy a 49 per cent stake in Liverpool, although the deal, which would have given Staveley a place on the club's board, eventually foundered.

==== Takeover of Newcastle United ====
On 20 November 2017, Staveley submitted a bid in the region of £300 million to buy Newcastle United, which failed. In 2020, a new takeover bid, primarily funded by the Saudi Arabian government's sovereign wealth fund (Public Investment Fund), was reported in April 2020. It fell through again on 30 July 2020 as reported by the BBC, The Times and other media. A £300 million deal was successfully concluded on 7 October 2021, in which Staveley took a 10% share in Newcastle United, as did the Reuben Brothers, and the Saudi Public Investment Fund took an 80% share.

The takeover sparked condemnation by human rights organizations who characterized the takeover as "sportswashing." The other 19 Premier League clubs condemned the Saudi takeover of Newcastle, stating that it damaged the brand of the Premier League. Staveley defended the takeover, arguing that it was not "sportswashing." Staveley has also argued that PIF, which is the Saudi Arabian government's sovereign wealth fund, is a separate entity from the Saudi Arabian government. On 12 July 2024, Staveley and her husband announced they had left Newcastle United and sold their remaining shares in the club which, by this time, had reduced to 6% from the original 10%.

=== Tottenham ===
In December 2024, Staveley submitted a bid to buy Tottenham Hotspur FC.

==== Other deals ====
Also in 2008, Staveley fronted a bid by the Qatar Investment Authority to buy the Trillium facilities management business from the Land Securities property group, an offer reportedly totaling £1.1 billion. The bid in the end came to nothing and Trillium was sold to Telereal for £750 million in January 2009.

Later that year, Staveley was involved in an attempt to help finance the $13.5 billion sale of Barclays Global Investors to the US firm BlackRock, offering $2.8 billion of funding in return for a shareholding of 10%, an amount that reportedly included a commitment of Staveley's own money. In June 2009, with details being finalised, BlackRock pulled out of the deal. Press reports at the time suggested that BlackRock had sought further clarification of the identity of the investors behind the special purpose vehicle created by PCP Capital Partners to handle the offer, although alternative reports claimed that they had always been aware of the conditions of the deal. In the end, BlackRock funded its purchase of BGI from other sources.

In 2010, Staveley was reported to have advised the Qatari property investment company Barwa in their purchase of the Park House site on Oxford Street in London from Land Securities for £250 million, a deal that was said to have earned PCP Capital Partners in the region of £5 million to £7.5 million in fees. In March 2012, it was announced that Waterway PCP Properties Ltd, a Middle Eastern private equity group fronted by Staveley, had paid Land Securities £234 million for their Arundel Great Court site on the north bank of the Thames in London.

== Personal life ==
Staveley initially hit the tabloid headlines after dating Andrew Mountbatten-Windsor, in 2003. In October 2011, she married British-Iranian financier Mehrdad Ghodoussi, in a ceremony held at West Wycombe Park in Buckinghamshire. In 2013, she was diagnosed with Huntington's disease. As of 2009, Staveley divided her time between Dubai and a house on London's Park Lane.
