= Susanna Dinnage =

British businesswoman

- Born: 1966 or 1967 (age 58–59)
- Title: Global president of Animal Planet
- Term: November 2017 – November 2019
- Predecessor: New role

Susanna Dinnage (born 1966/67) is a British businesswoman, who was formerly the current global president of the Animal Planet television network. In November 2018, she became the chief executive-designate of the English Premier League, and was scheduled to succeed Richard Scudamore in early 2019. On 30 December 2018, Dinnage told the organisation she would not be taking up the position.

== Career ==
Dinnage started her career at MTV Networks. She later worked for Channel 5 for more than ten years from its creation in 1997.

In 2009, Dinnage joined Discovery, Inc. and ran its British and Irish operation, including responsibility for Eurosport. During her time at Discovery, Eurosport obtained the European coverage rights to all Summer and Winter Olympic Games from 2018 to 2024. In November 2017, she was appointed the first global president of the Animal Planet network, which is owned by Discovery, Inc. Dinnage is also the chair of the Commercial Broadcasters Association, and an executive member of the Discovery Women's Network. In 2017, she was a leading contender to become chief executive of Channel 4, although the position was given to Alex Mahon instead.

In November 2018, Dinnage was chosen to succeed Richard Scudamore as chief executive of the English Premier League. She was the Premier League recruitment panel's preferred candidate, and her appointment was voted for by all 20 Premier League teams. Had she taken up the post in early 2019, Dinnage would have become the most senior female leader in major professional sport, the fourth Premier League chief since the formation of the Premier League in 1992, and the first female Premier League chief. On 30 December 2018, Dinnage told the organisation she would not be taking up the position. Dinnage never gave a reason for changing her mind.

In November 2019, it was announced that Dinnage would leave Animal Planet and the Discovery network, following a restructure.

== Personal life ==
Dinnage lives in Putney, London. She is a Fulham season ticket holder.
