= Glossary of association football terms =

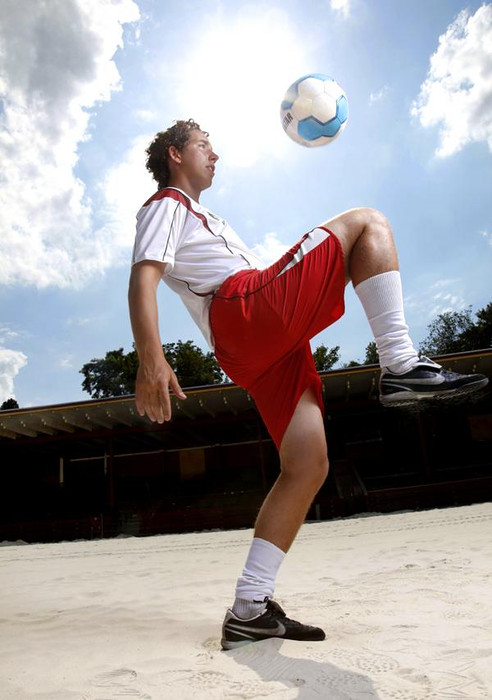
A player doing a keepie-uppie

Association football (more commonly known as football or soccer) was first codified in 1863 in England, although games that involved the kicking of a ball were evident considerably earlier. A large number of football-related terms have since emerged to describe various aspects of the sport and its culture. The evolution of the sport has been mirrored by changes in this terminology over time. For instance, the role of an inside forward in variants of a 2–3–5 formation has many parallels to that of an attacking midfielder, although the positions are nonetheless distinct. Similarly, a 2–3–5 centre half can in many ways be compared to a holding midfielder in a 4–1–3–2.

In many cases, multiple terms exist for the same concept. One reason for this is the progression of language over time. The sport itself, originally known as association football, is now more widely known by the shortened term football, or soccer, derived from the word association. Other duplicate terms can be attributed to differences among varieties of English. In Europe, where British English is prevalent, the achievement of not conceding a goal for an entire match is known as a clean sheet. In North America, where American and Canadian English dominate, the same achievement is referred to as a shutout.

Occasionally the actions of an individual have made their way into common football parlance. Two notable examples are Diego Maradona's goals in Argentina's 1986 World Cup quarter-final win against England. After the match, Maradona described his first goal—a handball that the referee missed—as having been scored "a little bit by the hand of God, another bit by the head of Maradona". His second goal was subsequently voted in a 2002 FIFA poll as the "Goal of the century". Both phrases are now widely understood to refer to the goals in that match.

== Inclusion criteria ==
This glossary serves as a point of reference for terms which are commonly used within association football, and which have a sport-specific meaning. It seeks to avoid defining common English words and phrases that have no special meaning within football. Exceptions include cases where a word or phrase's use in the context of football might cause confusion to someone not familiar with the sport (such as clean sheet), or where it is fundamental to understanding the sport (such as goal). Entries on nicknames relating to specific players or teams are actively avoided. Other phrases without entries are specific clubs, rivalries, media organisations or works, unless the name also has a more general meaning within football, as is the case with El Clásico and Roy of the Rovers stuff.

== 0–9 ==
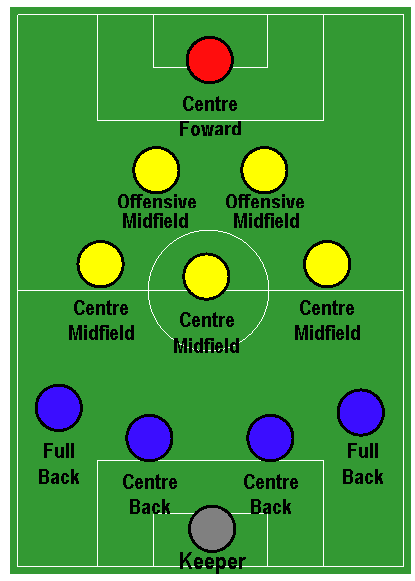
The 4–3–2–1 (Christmas Tree) formation, a variant of the 4–5–1

- 12th man – This expression has two different definitions. It usually refers to fans who are present at a football match, especially when they make such noise as to provide increased motivation for the team. The metaphor is based on the fact that a team numbers 11 active players at the start of a game. The term can also be used where a referee is perceived to be biased in favour of one team, and "They had a 12th man on the pitch" is a complaint made by fans. It also may refer to a player that's not usually part of the starting eleven, but comes off the bench most of the matches, a concept similar to the sixth man in basketball.
- 2–0 lead is the worst lead – popular cliché describing the situation in which one team is leading by a score of 2–0, causing them to become complacent.
- 2–3–5 – common 19th- and early 20th-century formation consisting of two defensive players (previously known as full backs), three midfield players (half-backs), and five forward players. Also known as the pyramid formation. Variations include the 2–3–2–3 (the Metodo or WW formation), where the inside forwards take up deeper positions.
- 3 points for a win – see Three points for a win.
- 39th game – see game 39.
- 4–4–2 – common modern formation used with four defenders, four midfielders, and two attacking players. There are many variants of this formation, such as the 4–4–2 diamond, where the four midfielders are assembled in a diamond shape without wide midfielders, and the 4–1–3–2, where one midfielder is expected to adopt a defensive position, allowing the other three to concentrate on attacking.
- 4–5–1 – common modern formation used with four defenders, five midfielders and one striker. By pushing the wingers forward, this formation can be adapted into a 4–3–3; teams frequently play 4–3–3 when they have the ball, and revert to 4–5–1 when they lose possession. Variants include the 4–4–1–1, where a striker drops deep or an attacking midfielder pushes forward to play in a supporting role to the main striker, the 4–2–3–1, where two holding midfielders are used, the 4–3–2–1 (or Christmas Tree), which uses three central midfielders behind two attacking midfielders and 4–6–0 which utilizes four defenders and six midfielders deployed as one holding player, two wing-backs and three who rotate between attack and defence positions.
- 4th place trophy – Colloquial term for the achievement of qualifying for the UEFA Champions League by finishing in the top four places in the English Premier League. The term was coined by Arsène Wenger, who said that "For me, there are five trophies, the first is to win the Premier League... the third is to qualify for the Champions League".
- 50–50 – see fifty-fifty
- 6+5 rule – proposal adopted by FIFA in 2008. Designed to counter the effects of the Bosman ruling, which had greatly increased the number of foreign players fielded by European clubs, the rule required each club to field at least six players who are eligible to play for the national team of the country of the club. The European Parliament prevented the rule from coming into effect in the European Union, declaring it incompatible with EU law – its future remains uncertain.

== A ==
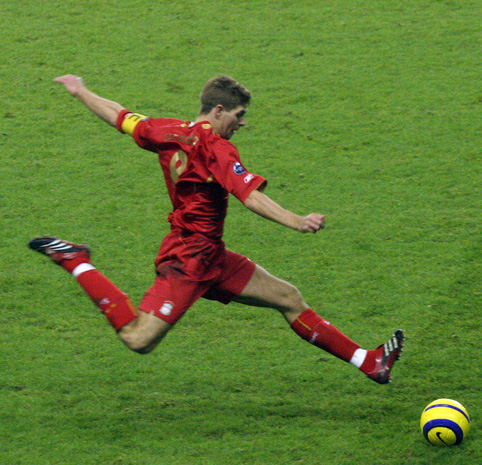
Liverpool captain Steven Gerrard wearing an armband

- Academy – model used by some professional clubs for youth development. Young players are contracted to the club and trained to a high standard, with the hope that some will develop into professional footballers. Some clubs provide academic as well as footballing education at their academies. Also known as a youth academy, or as a cantera in Spanish-speaking countries.
- Added time – see Stoppage time.
- Administration – legal process (sanction) where a business unable to pay its creditors seeks temporary legal protection from them, while it attempts to restructure its debt. Clubs going into administration usually incur a points deduction.
- Advantage – decision made by the referee during a game, where a player is fouled, but play is allowed to continue because the team that suffered the foul is in a better position than they would have been had the referee stopped the game.
- AFC – initialism for either the Asian Football Confederation, the governing body of the sport in Asia, or association football club, used by teams such as Sunderland AFC. It can also mean athletic football club, as seen in AFC Bournemouth.
- Against the run of play – a goal scored, or a win or draw achieved, by a side that was being clearly outplayed.
- Aggregate or aggregate score – combined score of matches between two teams in a two-legged match.
- All competitions or all comps – used to describe a team's or player's statistical progress in all senior league and cup matches across a season, career, or other set time period; used particularly when such competitions run concurrent with each other on the calendar (e.g. "Pelé scored 66 goals in all competitions in 1958"). Players' statistics are often reported separately as "league only" and "all competitions".
- "A" Match – international match for which both associations field their first team ("A" representative team).
- Anti-football – pejorative term for a particularly robust and defensive style of play.
- Apertura and Clausura – league format employed by several football leagues in Latin America, in which the traditional August–May season is divided into two separate league tournaments, each with its own champion. Apertura and Clausura are Spanish for "opening" and "closing".
- Apprentice – see Youth
- Arena football – see six-a-side football.
- Armband – worn by a team's captain, to signify that role. Black armbands are occasionally worn by an entire team in commemoration of a death or tragic event.
- Assist – pass that leads to a goal being scored.
- Assistant referee – one of a number of officials who assist the referee in controlling a match.
- Attacker – usually refers to a striker, or any player close to the opposing team's goal line.
- Away – see Home and away.
- Away goals rule – tie-break applied in some competitions with two-legged matches. In cases where the scores finish level on aggregate, the team that has scored more goals away from home is deemed the winner.

== B ==
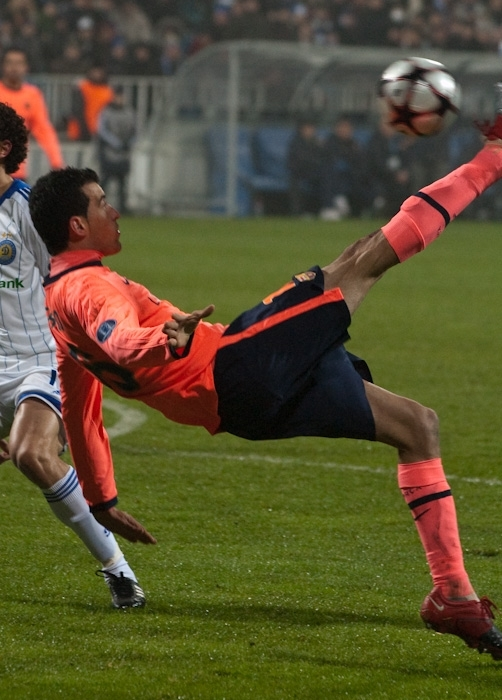
A player (Sergio Busquets of FC Barcelona) attempting a bicycle kick

- Back of the net – goal in which the ball is usually trapped at the back of the net until it is picked back up.
- Back-pass rule – rule introduced into the Laws of the Game in 1992 to help speed up play, specifying that goalkeepers are not allowed to pick up the ball if it was intentionally kicked back to them by a teammate.
- Backheel – type of pass or shot in which a player uses their heel to propel the ball backwards to another player or to the goal. Sometimes spelt back heel.
- Ball – spherical object normally kicked around by football players. Balls used in official matches are standardised for size, weight, and material, and manufactured to the specifications set in the Laws of the Game.
- Ball boy or ball girl – one of several children stationed around the edge of the pitch, whose role is to help retrieve balls that go out of play.
- Ball recovery – the successful attempt by a team to regain possession of the ball.
- Ballon d'Or – is an annual football award presented by French news magazine France Football since 1956 to honour the player deemed to have performed the best over the previous season.
- Barras bravas – organised supporter/hooligan groups in Latin America, similar to the European term Ultras.
- Beach football – variant of association football played on a beach or some form of sand. Also known as beach soccer or beasal.
- Behind closed doors – matches in which spectators are not present. Was the norm during large parts of the COVID-19 pandemic. May be imposed as a form of sanction for clubs whose supporters have behaved inappropriately. Such matches are sometimes arranged between clubs, to help hasten a player's return to fitness.
- Bench – area on the edge of the pitch where a team's substitutes and coaches sit, usually consisting an actual covered bench or a row of seats. More formally known as the substitutes' bench. Also sometimes called a dugout.
- Bend – skill attribute in which players strike the ball in a manner that applies spin, resulting in the flight of the ball curving, or bending, in mid-air. Players who are especially adept at achieving this will often be their team's designated free kick taker, as they are able to bend the ball around walls while taking shots at goal. The phrase "bend it like Beckham" stems from English player David Beckham's ability in this regard.
- Bicycle kick – move made by a player with their back to the goal. The player throws their body into the air, makes a shearing movement with the legs to get one leg in front of the other, and attempts to play the ball backwards over their own head, all before returning to the ground. Also known as an overhead kick.
- Big game player – a term that describes a player that often goes under the radar in normal matches but turns up for the occasion in important matches, and somewhat exceeds expectations in "big games".
- Booking – act of noting the offender in a cautionable offence, which results in a yellow card.
- Boot boy – young player who, in addition to his football training, is expected to perform menial tasks such as cleaning the boots of first-team players.
- Boots – player's footwear, normally with studs.
- Bosman ruling – ruling by the European Court of Justice related to player transfers that allows professional football players in the European Union to move freely to another club at the end of their term of contract with their present team. Handed down in 1995, it also banned the restricted movement of EU members within the leagues of member states. Named after Jean-Marc Bosman, the plaintiff in that court case.
- Bottler / to bottle – refers to a player or a team that initially plays in a reasonably well level, but, due to mistakes, end up in a poor form at the end of the season.
- Box – see Penalty area.
- Boxing Day – day after Christmas. Usually a day when many matches are played in England as part of a festive period schedule.
- Box-to-box – players with the ability to influence the game both defensively and offensively or, more generally, at both ends of the pitch.
- Brace – when a player scores two goals in a single match.
- Break – attacking manoeuvre in which several members of a defending team gain possession of the ball and suddenly counter-attack into their opponent's half of the pitch, overwhelming their opponents' defence in greater numbers, usually as a result of the opposing defenders' being out of position after having supported their attackers.
- B team – at club level, a variant of a reserve team. At international level, refers to occasional matches between national selects without age restrictions but below the highest level, usually to test inexperienced players in a similar environment to gauge their readiness for the senior squad or sometimes using only players based in a particular division. Such fixtures were played regularly in some eras and very rarely in others.
- Build-up – The phase of play when a team has possession of the ball and tries to score while the opponent is in an organized defence.
- Bung – secret and unauthorised payment, used as a financial incentive to help a transfer go through.
- Byline – markings on the shortest side of the pitch, which run from the posts to the corners. Also known as the End line.

== C ==
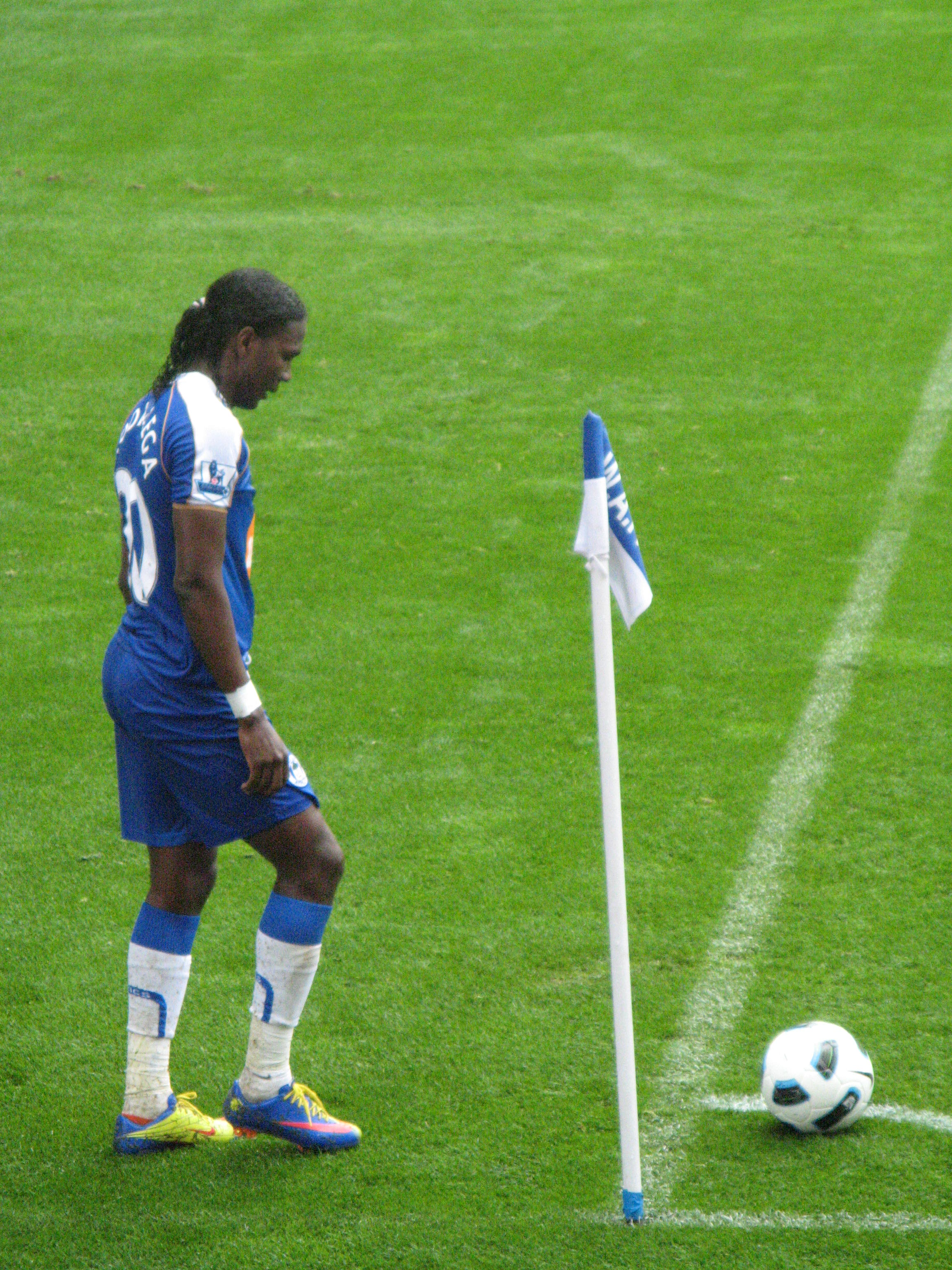
Wigan Athletic player Hugo Rodallega standing by the corner flag, about to take a corner kick

- CAF – initialism for the Confederation of African Football, the governing body of the sport in Africa.
- Cap – appearance of a player for a national team. Originates from the traditional presentation of a cap to British players who made international appearances.
- Cap-tied – a term used when a player has represented a national team and as a consequence is ineligible to play for another. A play on the older term Cup-tied
- Captain – player chosen to lead a team, and in a match to participate in the coin toss before the start of play. Also known as a skipper.
- Caretaker manager – person chosen to perform managerial duties when no permanent manager is installed.
- Catenaccio – tactical system that puts an emphasis on defence. In Italian, catenaccio means "door-bolt", implying a highly organised and effective backline defence to prevent goals.
- Caution – see yellow card.
- Centre circle – 10-yard radius circle around the centre spot.
- Centre spot – mark in the centre of the pitch from which play is started at the beginning of each half, and restarted following the scoring of a goal.
- Challenge – see tackle.
- Channel – empty space between the fullback and the central defender when a defence is playing with a back four. Wide-playing strikers are said to operate "in the channels".
- Champions League – annual confederation-wide tournament involving the champions and other successful teams from that confederation's domestic leagues. The term can refer to the tournaments held in the AFC, CAF, CONCACAF or OFC, but is most commonly used in reference to the competition held by UEFA. The CONMEBOL equivalent is the Copa Libertadores.
- Chance – situation where an attacking player can shoot at goal, with a realistic prospect of scoring. Also known as an opportunity.
- Chip – high trajectory shot or cross, executed by wedging the foot underneath the ball.
- Christmas tree – see 4–5–1
- Clausura – see Apertura and Clausura
- Clean sheet – when a goalkeeper or team does not concede a single goal during a match.
- Clearance – when a player kicks the ball away from the goal they are defending.
- Club – collective name for a football team, and the organisation that runs it.
- Cold, rainy night in Stoke – phrase asking if a player could adapt under harsh conditions against a physical team such as Stoke City. The phrase originates from the 2010 Ballon d'Or debate, implying that, while extraordinarily prolific in La Liga, Lionel Messi wouldn't be able to "do it on a cold, rainy night in Stoke", unlike fellow Ballon d'Or contender Cristiano Ronaldo, who had already proven himself in the Premier League.
- Consolation goal – when a losing team scores a goal which has no impact on the final result.
- Compact defending – a defensive tactic related to compactness
- Co-ownership – system whereby two football clubs own the contract of a player jointly, although the player is only registered to play for one club.
- CONCACAF – acronym for the Confederation of North, Central American and Caribbean Association Football, the governing body of the sport in North and Central America and the Caribbean; pronounced "kon-ka-kaff".
- CONMEBOL – acronym for the South American Football Association, the governing body of the sport in South America; pronounced "kon-me-bol".
- Corner flag – flags are placed in each of the four corners of the pitch to help mark the boundaries of the playing area.
- Corner kick – kick taken from within a one-yard radius of the corner flag; a method of restarting play when a player puts the ball behind their own goal line without a goal being scored.
- Corridor of uncertainty – a cross or pass which is delivered into the area in front of the goalkeeper and behind the last line of defence.
- Counter-attack or counterattack – see break.
- Counter-pressing or counterpressing – While pressing is a tactic applied by a team in its defensive shape, counter-pressing is applied immediately after losing the ball in order to quickly regain possession.
- Cross – delivery of the ball into the penalty area by the attacking team, usually from the area between the penalty box and the touchline.
- Crossbar – horizontal bar across the top of the goal.
- Cruyff turn – type of turn named after Dutchman Johan Cruyff; designed to lose an opponent. Specifically, the ball is gently kicked sideways by one foot, but behind the player's own standing leg.
- Cuauhtemiña – skill move attributed to Mexican player Cuauhtémoc Blanco, which he performed notably at the 1998 World Cup. When multiple players attempted to tackle him, he trapped the ball between his feet and jumped over them, releasing the ball in the air and landing with it under control.
- Cup (~ competition, ~ format, ~ tie): a single-elimination tournament, as opposed to a league (round-robin tournament); respectively called after England's FA Cup and Football League. Depending on the competition, cup ties may be a single match or a two-legged tie; often the "cup final" is a single match at a predetermined venue.
- Cup run – a series of wins in a cup competition, usually applied to teams from lower division.
- Cup tie – a match between two teams in a cup competition, as opposed to a regular league match.
- Cup-tied – where a player is ineligible to play in a cup competition because they have played for a different team earlier in the same competition.
- Cupset – A modern portmanteau of cup and upset, often used in sports journalism to refer to win for an underdog in a knockout competition.
- Curl – see bend.
- Curva – curved stands behind the goals in a football stadium, usually home to fanatical fans, or "ultras".
- Custodian – alternative term for a goalkeeper.

== D ==
- D – semi-circular arc at the edge of the penalty area, used to indicate the portion of the 10-yard distance around the penalty spot that lies outside the penalty area. Referred to in the Laws of the Game as "the penalty arc".
- Dead ball – situation when the game is restarted with the ball stationary, such as a free kick.
- Deep – describes the positioning of a player (or a line of players, such as the defence or midfield) who is playing closer to their own goal than they traditionally would. A defence may drop deep against a team with fast attacking players, to reduce the amount of space behind the defence for fast-paced players to break into. Attacking players or midfielders who traditionally play deep may be described as being a deep-lying forward or a deep-lying playmaker.
- Defender – one of the four main positions in football. Defenders are positioned in front of the goalkeeper and have the principal role of keeping the opposition away from their goal.
- Defensive wall – see Wall
- Derby – match between two, usually local, rivals.
- Designated player rule – rule in Major League Soccer that allows teams to nominate players who are paid either partially or completely outside the salary cap.
- Direct free kick – awarded to fouled team following certain listed "penal" fouls. A goal may be scored directly from a direct free kick.
- Dirty work – the type of play undertaken by a defensive midfielder – such as making tackles in midfield, playing short passes to the wing, and breaking up opponents' attacking moves – which is necessary for a team to be successful, but rarely receives recognition or acclaim, and is not considered "glamorous".
- Dissent – breach of the Laws of the Game, whereby a player uses offensive language or gestures towards official(s). In extreme cases it can result in yellow or red cards being issued.
- Diving – form of cheating, sometimes employed by an attacking player to win a free kick or penalty. When being challenged for the ball by an opponent, the player will throw themselves to the ground as though they had been fouled, in an attempt to deceive the referee into thinking a foul has been committed. Also known as a flop.
- Doing a Leeds – when a club incurs substantial debts through over-ambitious spending and subsequently drops down one or more divisions. Named after Leeds United, who reached the semi-finals of the UEFA Champions League in 2001 as a Premier League club but were playing in Football League One only six years later. The phrase is sometimes also used in relation to other clubs, for instance "Doing a Wimbledon".
- Double – most commonly used when a club wins both its domestic league and its country's major cup competition in the same season. Also refers to a pair of victories, home and away, by one club over another in the same league season.
- Dr. Griffin – a pass 'to Dr. Griffin' designates a pass into an empty space, received by no other teammate (alluding to Griffin (The Invisible Man))
- Dribbling – when a player runs with the ball at their feet under close control. Dribbling on a winding course past several opponents in close proximity without losing possession is sometimes described as making a mazy run or mazy dribble.
- Drop ball – method used to restart a game, sometimes when a player has been injured accidentally and the game is stopped while the ball is still in play.
- Drop points – when a team does not win all three standings points available to them in a league or tournament game, either through a draw (in which they earn just one point) or a loss (zero points); also used to describe a team losing ground to other teams ahead of them in a league's standings.
- Dugout – see bench.
- Dummy – skill move performed by a player receiving a pass from a teammate; the player receiving the ball will angle their body in such a way that the opponent thinks they are going to play the ball. The player will then intentionally allow the ball to run by them to a teammate close by without touching it, confusing the opponent as to which player has the ball.

== E ==
- Early doors – term frequently utilized by commentators to describe the early stages of a match.
- El Clásico – derby fixtures in Spanish-speaking countries such as Argentina and Mexico. In Spain, and countries where Spanish is not a primary language, it is commonly understood as the name of the derby between Spanish clubs Real Madrid and Barcelona.
- El Sackico – A play on El Clásico, defining a game, derby or not, that is incredibly likely to decide the fate of one or both managers.
- Elevator team – see Yo-yo club.
- End-to-end stuff – exciting, action-packed match. Usually involves suspense, as end-to-end indicates both teams are creating goal scoring opportunities on opposite sides of the field.
- Equaliser – a goal that makes the score even.
- European night – night-time game in a UEFA club competition.
- Exhibition match – see Friendly.
- Expected goals (xG) - a statistical metric that assigns a probability that each shot will result in a goal. By summing these probabilities, xG is used to estimate how many goals a team or player would be expected to score given the chances created, independent of whether those chances were actually converted.
- Expunge – to render all matches played by a given team up to a certain point in a league season null and void and remove them from the league table, recalculating all other teams' records accordingly. This usually occurs when a team is expelled or resigns from the league in mid-season.
- Extra time – additional period, normally two halves of 15 minutes, used to determine the winner in some tied cup matches.

== F ==
Fans of Racing Club de Avellaneda, supporting their team before a match

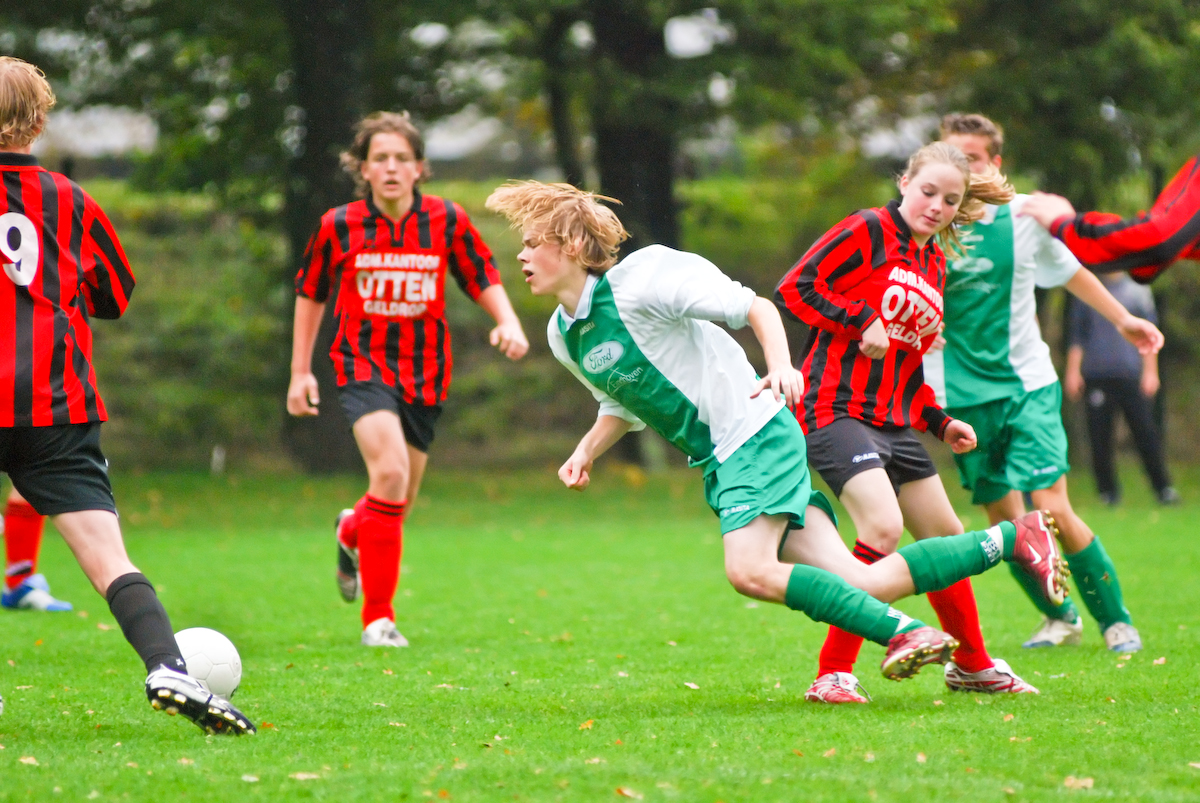
A player (red/black) commits a foul by tripping her opponent (green/white).

- FA Cup – English knockout competition – the oldest cup tournament in the world.
- False nine – A centre forward who regularly drops back into midfield to disrupt opposition marking.
- Fan – follower of a football team or someone who simply enjoys watching the game. Also known as supporter.
- Fan park – area away from grounds – often in city centres – used to screen matches on large television screens for fans, normally for big tournaments such as the World Cup or other important matches.
- Fans' favourite – player that is extremely popular with fans of a club or nation.
- Farmers league – a derogatory term referring to football leagues perceived not to be as competitive as others. The literal definition of farmers league is a league that involves players who have day-time jobs farming and play football in the evenings.
- Favourite – team that is expected to win a particular match or tournament. Opposite of underdog.
- FC – initialism for football club, used by teams such as Watford FC.
- Feeder club – a smaller club linked to a larger club, usually to provide first-team experience for younger players who remain contracted to the larger club, with several varying aspects agreed by the participants including length of agreement, number of players involved and coaching input from the larger club. More commonly known as a 'farm team' in other sports. A feeder club, which has a working agreement with another club but is independent from it, differs from a reserve or 'B' team which to some extent serves a similar function but is operated directly by the club itself.
- Feign injury – see play-acting
- Fergie time – the idea that Manchester United, when managed by Sir Alex Ferguson ("Fergie"), got what rival fans considered to be generous and/or excessive added time when Ferguson's team were losing, particularly at home.
- Field of play – see pitch.
- Field player – see outfield player.
- FIFA – acronym for Fédération Internationale de Football Association (International Federation of Association Football), the world governing body of the sport; pronounced "fee-fa".
- Fifty-fifty – a challenge in which two players have an equal chance of winning control of a loose ball.
- Final whistle – see full-time.
- Finishing – the act of scoring a goal.
- First eleven – the eleven players who, when available, would be the ones usually chosen by the team's manager to start a game.
- First team – the most senior team fielded by a club.
- First touch – skill attribute for a player which signifies their ability to bring the ball completely under control immediately upon receiving it.
- Fixture – a scheduled match.
- Fixture congestion – situation where a team is required to play many matches in a short period of time. Extended runs in cup competitions or prolonged spells of bad weather can cause matches to be postponed, causing fixture congestion as the team is required to catch up all the postponed matches. A team may appeal to a governing body to extend their season but it is not compulsory for a governing body to act upon a request.
- Flag – small rectangular flag attached to a handle, used by an assistant referee to signal that they have seen a foul or other infraction take place. One assistant referee's flag is a solid colour (often yellow), and their colleague's has a two-colour (often red and yellow) quartered pattern. Some flags have buttons on the handle, which will activate an alarm worn by the referee to attract their attention. Can also refer to the corner flag. The action of an assistant referee signalling with the flag is called flagging.
- Flank – in football, a part of the playing area near to one of the sidelines, or the players or part of the team that play in that area.
- Flat back four – defensive positioning system, in which the primary first position of each member of a four-man defence is in a straight line across the pitch; often used in conjunction with an offside trap. In formations with three centre backs, the phrase "flat back three" is sometimes used.
- Flick-on – when a player receives a pass from a teammate and, instead of controlling it, touches the ball with their head or foot while it is moving past them, with the intent of helping the ball reach another teammate.
- Football – a widely used name for association football. Can also refer to the ball.
- Football League – English league competition founded in 1888, the oldest such competition in the world.
- Football programme – also known as match programme; booklet purchased by spectators attending a football match containing information relevant to it, including lists of players, short articles penned by commentators and the like. Older programmes may have considerable value as collectables.
- Football pyramid – also known as league system; hierarchy of leagues which teams can be promoted or relegated between, depending on finishing positions or playoffs. They are often referred to as "pyramids" due to their tendency to have increasing number of regional and local divisions further down the tiers (or "steps"), leading to a pyramid-like structure.
- Formation – how the players in a team are positioned on the pitch. The formation is often denoted numerically, with the numbers referring to the corresponding number of players in defensive, midfield and attacking positions, for example 4–4–2 refers to a formation of four defenders, four midfielders, and two forwards (as the presence of a goalkeeper is mandatory, the goalkeeper is not included when describing a formation in this way).
- Fortress – home ground of a team boasting a strong home form.
- Forward – see Striker.
- Foul – breach of the Laws of the Game by a player, punishable by a free kick or penalty. Such acts can lead to yellow or red cards depending on their severity.
- Fourth official – additional assistant referee, who has various duties and can replace one of the other officials, in case of injury.
- Fox in the box – see Goal poacher.

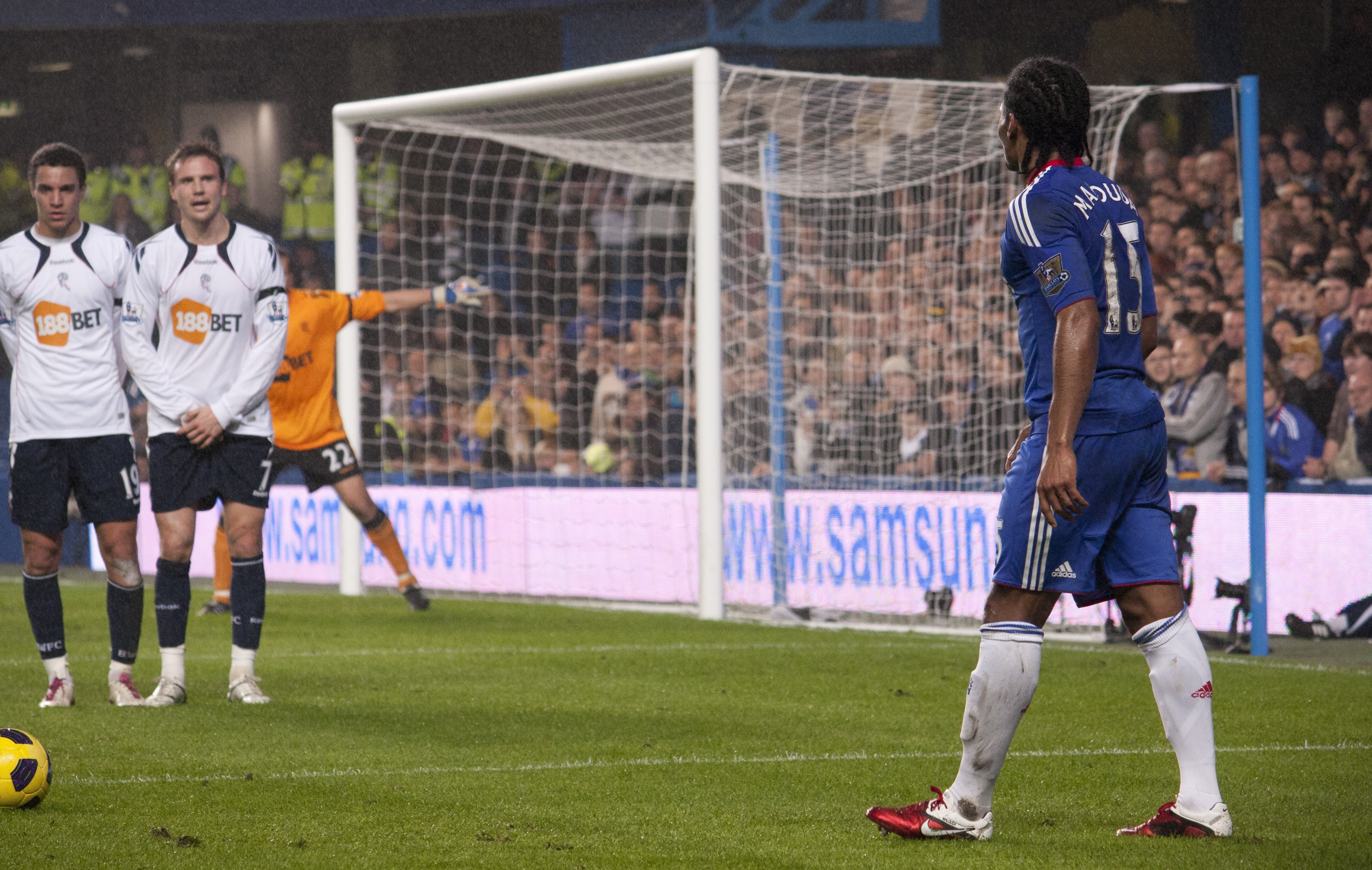
A player (blue) about to take a free kick

- Free kick – the result of a foul outside the penalty area, given against the offending team. Free kicks can be either direct (shot straight towards the goal) or indirect (the ball must touch another player before a goal can be scored).
- Freestyle football – art of a player expressing themself with a football, while performing various tricks with any part of their body. Similar in style to keepie-uppie and kemari, it has become a widespread sport across the world and is practised by many people.
- Friendly – match arranged by two teams with no competitive value, such as a player's testimonial or a warm-up match before a season begins.
- Fullback – position on either side of the defence, whose job is to try to prevent the opposing team attacking down the wings. Also spelt full back or full-back.
- Full-time – either (1) the end of the game, signalled by the referee's whistle (also known as the final whistle), or (2) a footballer or coach whose only profession is football, and by extension a club employing such players and coaches.
- Futsal – variant of association football that is played on a smaller hard court surface and mainly played indoors. Involves two teams with five players each, one of whom is the goalkeeper, with an unlimited number of substitutes permitted and is played in two periods each lasting 20 minutes. Similar, but not identical, to six-a-side football.

== G ==
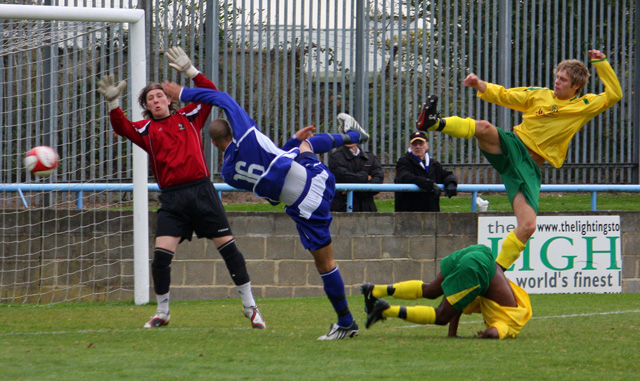
A goalmouth scramble

- Game 39 – proposal to add an extra round of Premier League matches played outside of the United Kingdom to each season. Also known as the 39th game. Named as such because, since the Premier League is played by 20 teams, and the competition system is the double round-robin (see round-robin tournament), each team plays 38 games in a season.
- Game of two halves – a close match where one team dominates each half.
- Game(s) in hand – situation where a team have played fewer games than one or more other teams in their league at a given point in the season and therefore have the opportunity to score more points than the other team(s) during the remainder of the season
- Garbage ball – a football associated with street football and other informal games where manufactured footballs are not available. They consist of various types of garbage, often discarded plastic, which are held together with twine.
- Ghost game – a betting scam, first discovered in the early 2010s, in which bookmakers, either by being deceived or as accessories, post odds and take bets on a match that never actually takes place.
- Ghost goal – situations where a ball fairly crossed the goal line but did not result in a goal, or a goal was awarded despite the ball not crossing the line.
- Giant-killing – a lower division team defeating another team from a much higher division in that country's league.
- Give-and-go – see One-two.
- Goal – the only method of scoring in football; for a goal to be awarded the ball must pass completely over the goal line in the area between the posts and beneath the crossbar.
- Goal average – number of goals scored divided by number of goals conceded. Used as a tie-breaking method before the introduction of goal difference.
- Goal difference – net difference between goals scored and goals conceded. Used to differentiate league positions when clubs are tied on points.
- Goal from open play – any goal that is not scored from a dead ball situation.
- Goal hanger – A somewhat disparaging term for a striker who is perceived to spend most of the match in or near the opposing penalty area, waiting for an opportunity to score a goal. Gary Lineker and Filippo Inzaghi are two players who have been described as such.
- Goalkeeper – a specialist playing position with the job of defending a team's goal and preventing the opposition from scoring. They are the only player on the pitch that can handle the ball in open play, although they can only do so in their penalty area. Known informally as a keeper or a goalie.
- Goal kick – method of restarting play when the ball is played over the goal line by a player of the attacking team without a goal being scored.
- Goal line – line at one of the shorter ends of the pitch, spanning from one corner flag to another, with the goalposts situated at the halfway point; sometimes used to refer to the particular section of the goal line between the two goalposts Also spelt goal-line.
- Goal-line clearance – when a player performs a clearance of the ball right off or near the goal line.
- Goal-line technology – an electronic system used to determine whether the ball has crossed the line for a goal or not.
- Goal poacher – type of striker, primarily known for excellent scoring ability and movement inside the penalty area.
- Goalmouth – the section of the pitch immediately in front of the goal.
- Goalmouth scramble – when multiple players from both teams attempt to gain control of a loose ball in the goalmouth. This often results in a short period of chaotic play involving attackers shooting towards goal and defenders blocking shots, balls ricocheting around the goalmouth, and players falling over. Also known as a scrimmage.
- Goal of the century – usually used to refer to Diego Maradona's second goal against England in the 1986 FIFA World Cup.
- Goalpost – vertical bars at either side of the goal.
- Goalside – when a player is located closer to the goal than their opponent.
- Golazo – a spectacular or impressive goal
- Golden Generation – an exceptionally talented set of players who are expected to achieve a high level of success, or who have been part of a highly successful squad in a team's history. Usually associated to national teams.
- Golden goal – method of determining the winner of a match which is a draw after 90 minutes of play. Up to an additional 30 minutes are played in two 15-minute halves, the first team to score wins and the match ends immediately. See also Silver goal.
- Grand Slam – achieved by a club that wins all official international competitions.
- Green card – a virtual card awarded after the game by the referee in Italy's Serie B to a player whose actions illustrate "positive behaviour" during the game.
- Groundhopping – hobby among fans, in which the objective is to visit as many football stadiums and grounds as possible. Participants are known as groundhoppers or simply hoppers.
- Group of death – group in a cup competition which is unusually competitive, because the number of strong teams in the group is greater than the number of qualifying places available for the next phase of the tournament.

== H ==
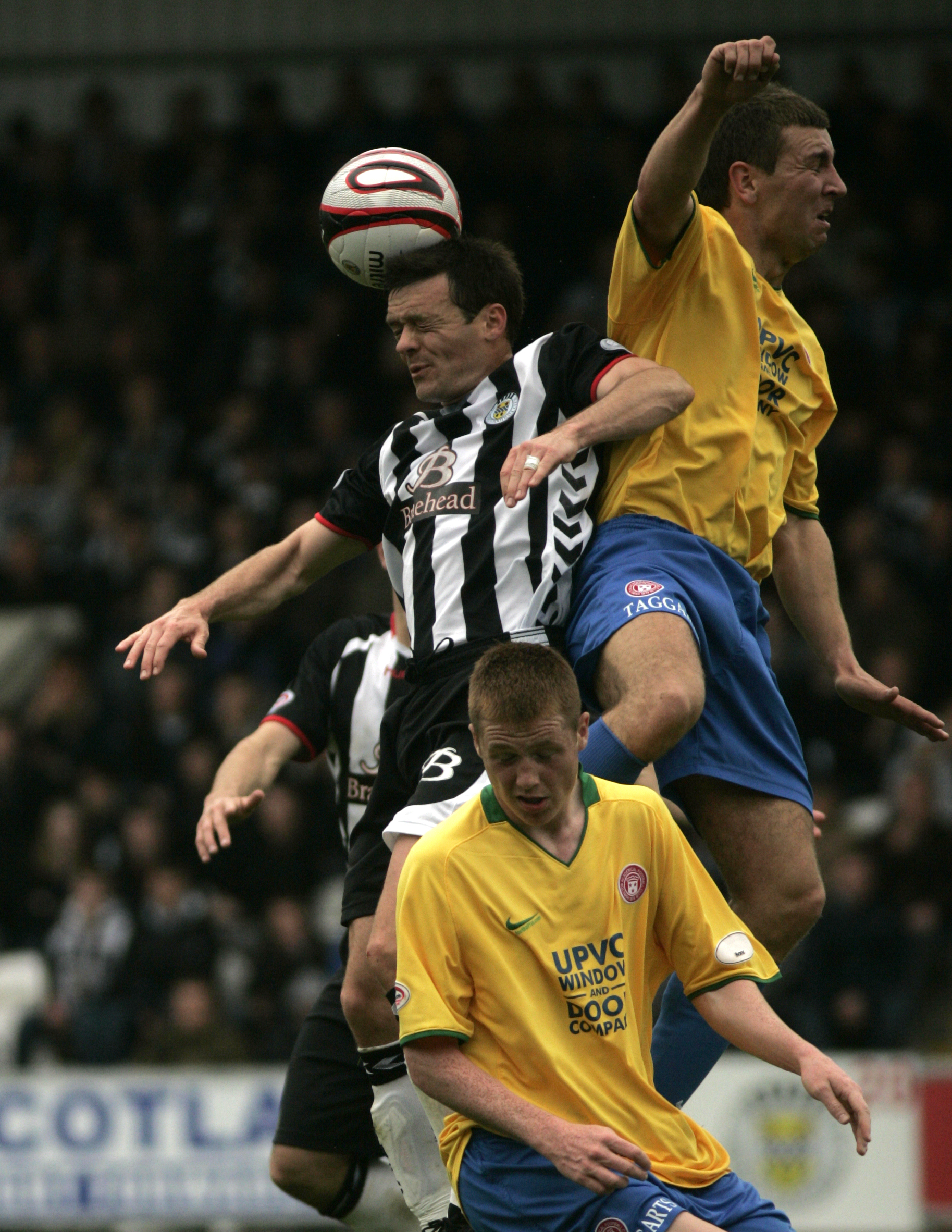
A player (black/white) being challenged by two defenders (yellow/blue), attempting to make a header

- Hairdryer treatment – manager yelling at players without mercy in the dressing room, intended to motivate them. In this scenario, the manager acts as the hairdryer. Made popular by former Manchester United manager Alex Ferguson.
- Half-back – position employed in a 2–3–5 formation, half-backs would play in front of the full-backs and behind the forwards. The middle half-back was known as a centre-half; those on either side were known as wing-halves.
- Half-time – break between the two halves of a match, usually lasts 15 minutes.
- Half-volley – pass or shot in which the ball is struck just as, or just after, it touches the ground.
- Hammer – to beat a team by a big margin.
- Handbags – colloquialism, especially in the United Kingdom, referring to an event where two or more players from opposing teams square up to each other in a threatening manner, or push and jostle each other in an attempt to assert themselves, without any actual violent conduct taking place.
- Hand ball or handball – when a player (other than a goalkeeper inside their penalty area) deliberately touches the ball with their hand or arm (from the tips of the fingers to level with the bottom of the armpit) in active play. A foul is given against the player if spotted.
- Hand of God – Diego Maradona's first goal against England in the 1986 FIFA World Cup, which he scored by using his hand.
- Hang up one's boots – to retire from football
- Hard man – a player noted for their aggressive style of play, especially for strong tackles.
- Hat-trick – when a player scores three goals in a single match.
- Header – using the head as a means of playing or controlling the ball.
- High foot – colloquialism for what is described in the Laws of the Game as "Playing in a dangerous manner". A foul is awarded if the referee determines that a player's foot has moved into a dangerously high position while trying to play the ball, especially if the foot threatens or causes an injury to an opponent.
- Holding role or Holding midfielder – central midfielder whose primary role is to protect the defence.
- Hold up the ball – when a player, usually a forward, receives a long ball from a teammate, and controls and shields it from the opposition, with the intent of slowing the play down to allow teammates to join the attack.
- Hole – space on a pitch between the midfield and forwards. In formations where attacking midfielders or deep-lying forwards are used, they are said to be "playing in the hole".
- Hollywood ball – a long range pass, often designed to look spectacular, but one which rarely achieves what the passer hopes.
- Home and away – a team's own ground and their opponent's, respectively. The team playing at their own stadium is said to have "home advantage".
- Hooligans – fanatical supporters known for violence.
- Hospital ball – sometimes referred to as hospital pass; when a player plays a slightly under-strength pass to a teammate, to such an extent that it becomes likely that both the teammate and an opposing player will come into contact with the ball simultaneously, therefore increasing the likelihood of one or both players suffering an injury while challenging for the ball.
- Howler – glaring and possibly amusing error made by a player or referee during a match.

== I ==
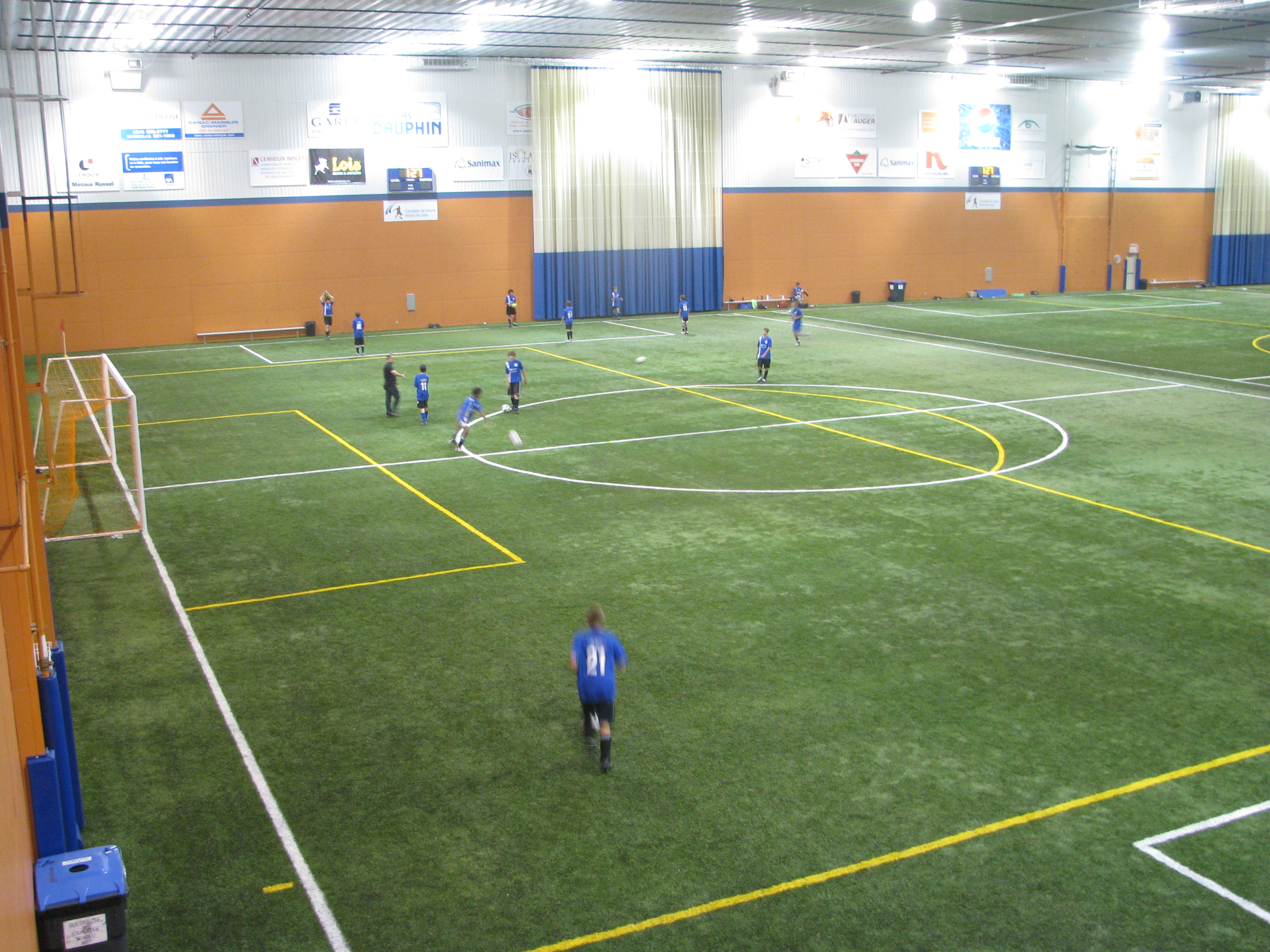
An indoor football facility

- IFAB – initialism for the International Football Association Board, the body that determines the Laws of the Game of association football.
- Indirect free kick – type of free kick awarded to the opposing team following "non-penal" fouls, certain technical infringements, or when play is stopped to caution or dismiss an opponent without a specific foul having occurred. Unlike in a direct free kick, a goal may not be scored directly from an indirect free kick.
- Indoor football – see six-a-side football.
- Indoor soccer – see six-a-side football.
- Injury recovery – the time it takes for a player to recover from having been injured.
- Injury time – see stoppage time.
- Inside forward – position employed in a 2–3–5 formation. The inside forwards played just behind the centre forward, similar to the modern attacking midfielder or second striker.
- Intercept – to prevent a pass from reaching its intended recipient.
- International break – period of time set aside by FIFA for scheduled international matches per their International Match Calendar. Also known as FIFA International Day/Date(s).
- International clearance – clearance required from foreign or overseas football associations before the transfer of a player can be completed where that player is moving across national or international borders.

== J ==
- Journeyman – player who has represented many different clubs over their career. Opposite of one-club man.
- Juggling – see keepie-uppie.
- Jumpers for goalposts – informal name for a version of street football where players lay down items of clothing to mark out goals. The term also has a nostalgic factor, especially in England, intended to invoke memories of a more "innocent" and "pure" type of football from childhood.

== K ==
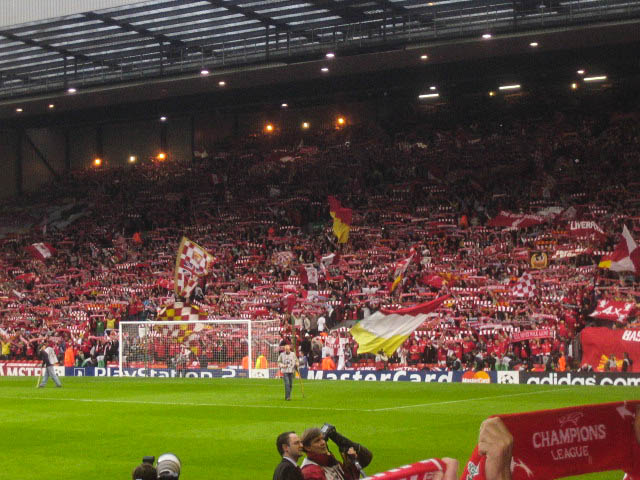
The famous Kop at Anfield, home of Liverpool F.C.

- Keeper – see goalkeeper.
- Keepie-uppie – the skill of juggling a football, keeping it off the ground using the feet, the knees, the chest, the shoulders or the head. Also known as keepy-uppy, kick-ups, or juggling. The phrases are sometimes spelt as two separate words, for instance keepie uppie.
- Kick and rush – style of play. See also Long ball.
- Kick-off – method of starting a match; the ball is played from the centre spot with all members of the opposing team at least 10 yards from the ball. Also used to restart the match when a goal has been scored.
- Kill the game – goal that increases the advantage for one team and defines the outcome of the match, reducing the chance of an equalizer. A goal that kills the game is usually scored in the final moments of a match.
- Kit – football-specific clothing worn by players, consisting at the minimum of a shirt, shorts, socks, specialised footwear, and (for goalkeepers) specialised gloves. Also known as a uniform or a strip.
- Knock – small injury
- Kop – British colloquial name for terraced stands in stadiums, especially those immediately behind the goals. Most commonly associated with Liverpool F.C., they are so named due to their steep nature, which resembles a hill in South Africa that was the scene of the Battle of Spion Kop in January 1900 during the Second Boer War.
- Knuckleball – a method of striking the ball so that it produces almost no spinning motion during its flight. It has frequently been colloquially described as "knuckleballing" by commentators, due to the ball motions that resemble that of a baseball thrown with a knuckleball pitch. This type of shot is usually used for long range shots or during free-kicks, and makes it difficult for the goalkeeper to save.

== L ==
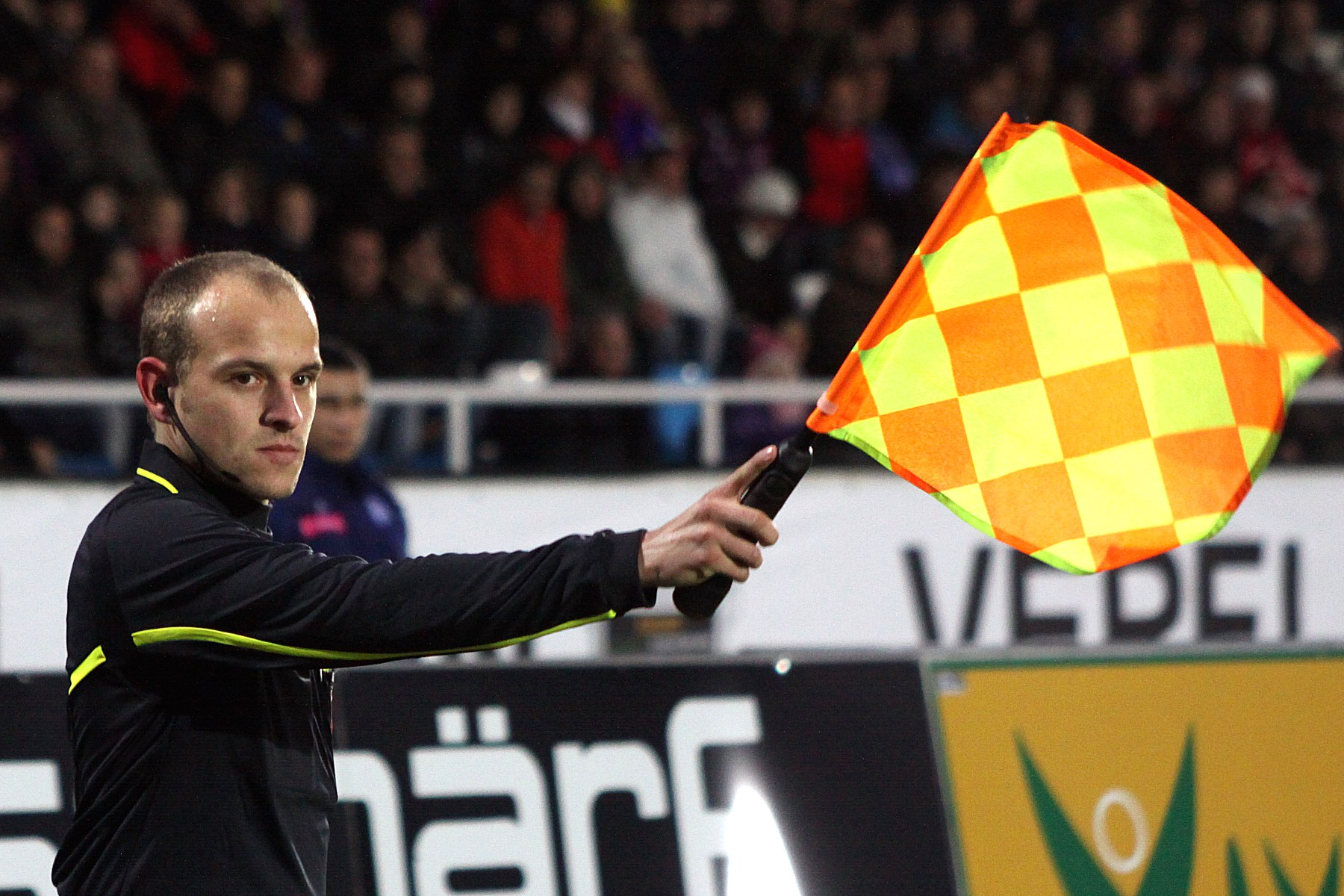
A linesman holds up his flag.

- Last man – situation where an attacking player is in possession, with only one opposing defender between the ball and the goal. If the defender commits a foul on the attacker, a red card is usually shown.
- Last-minute goal – a goal scored either in the final or penultimate minute of regulation time or extra time, or during stoppage time or injury time. Last-minute goals are often noteworthy if it allows the scoring team to either take the lead or to equalise, such as when Manchester United scored two last-minute goals in the 1999 UEFA Champions League Final against Bayern Munich to win the competition.
- Lay-off pass – short pass, usually lateral, played delicately into the space immediately in front of a teammate who is arriving at speed from behind the player making the pass; the player receiving the pass will then be able to take control of the ball without breaking stride, or (if they are close enough to the goal) attempt to score with a first-time shot.
- Laws of the Game – codified rules that help define association football. These laws are published by the sport's governing body FIFA, with the approval of the International Football Association Board, the body that writes and maintains the laws. The laws mention: the number of players a team should have, the game length, the size of the field and ball, the type and nature of fouls that referees may penalise, the frequently misinterpreted offside law, and many other laws that define the sport.
- League – form of competition in which clubs are ranked by the number of points they accumulate over a series of matches. Often structured as round-robin tournaments.
- Libero – see Sweeper.
- Limbs – scene of fans wildly celebrating a goal.
- Linesman – see Assistant referee.
- Loan – when a player temporarily plays for a club other than the one they are currently contracted to. Such a loan may last from a few weeks to one or more seasons. This often occurs with young players who are commonly loaned to lower league clubs in order to gain valuable experience. The loaning club often takes over the responsibility of paying the player's wages so it can also occur when the originating club seeks to cut down expenses.
- Long ball – attempt to distribute the ball a long distance down the field via a cross, without the intention to pass it to the feet of the receiving player. Often used to speed up play, the technique can be especially effective for a team with either fast or tall strikers.
- Lost the dressing room – where a team's manager is deemed to have lost control and support of the players.
- Low block – involves a team defending very deep in their own half of the pitch with the aim of restricting attacking space for the opposition.

== M ==
- Magic sponge – sponge soaked in water used as a simplistic treatment for players injured during a game in the era before the emergence of properly-qualified football physiotherapists.
- Manager – the individual in charge of the day-to-day running of the team. Duties of the manager usually include overseeing training sessions, designing tactical plays, choosing the team's formation, picking the starting eleven, and making tactical switches and substitutions during games. Some managers also take on backroom administrative responsibilities such as signing players, negotiating player contracts. Sometimes these tasks are also undertaken by a two separate individuals: a Head coach for on-field tasks, and a General manager or Director of Football for off-field administrative duties.
- Man of the match – award, often decided by pundits or sponsors, given to the best player in a game.
- Man on! – warning shout uttered by players (and fans) to a teammate with the ball to alert him of the presence of an opposing player behind him.
- Man-to-man marking – system of marking in which each player is responsible for an opposing player rather than an area of the pitch. Compare with zonal marking.
- Marking – Defensive strategy, aimed at preventing an attacker from receiving the ball from a teammate. See man-to-man marking and zonal marking.
- Match fixing – the situation when a match is played to a completely or partially pre-determined result motivated by financial incentives paid to players, team officials or referees in violation of the rules of the game.
- Mazy run – see Dribbling.
- Medical – mandatory procedure undertaken by a player prior to signing for a new team which assesses the player's fitness and overall medical health. Usually the procedure includes muscle and ligament/joint examinations, cardiovascular tests to identify potential heart problems, respiratory tests, and neurological tests to identify possible concussions or other such problems.
- Mexican wave – self-organised crowd activity in which spectators stand up, raise their hands in the air, and sit down in sequence, creating a ripple effect that moves around the stadium's stands. Despite having been carried out in stadia for many years previously, it was first brought to worldwide attention during the 1986 FIFA World Cup in Mexico, hence its name.
- Mickey Mouse cup – cup, league, or other competition considered of a lower standard, importance, or significance.
- Midfielder – one of the four main positions in football. Midfielders are positioned between the defenders and strikers.
- Minnow – see underdog.
- Multiball system – the use of several balls during a game, intended to reduce the amount of time the ball is not in play. Historically, the same ball was used throughout the entire game, and had to be retrieved every time it went out of play. Under the multiball system, as soon as the ball goes out of play, a new ball is passed to the player by a ball boy, who then retrieves the other ball while the game continues.

== N ==
- Near post/Back post – notional concept, referring to the position of a goalkeeper in relation to the posts. When an attacker scores a goal by placing the ball between the goalkeeper and the post to which they are closest, the goalkeeper is said to have been beaten at the near post.
- Neutral ground or neutral venue – venue for a match that is the home stadium of neither team.
- Normal time – the first 90 minutes of a match.
- Not interfering with play – see passive offside.
- Nutmeg – when a player intentionally plays the ball between an opponent's legs, runs past the opponent, and collects their own pass.

== O ==
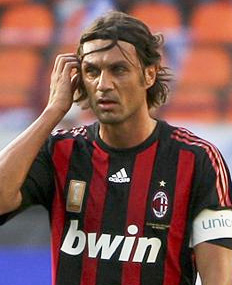
One-club man Paolo Maldini appeared in more than 600 matches for AC Milan over 25 seasons.

- Obstruction – illegal defensive technique, in which a defensive player who does not have control of the ball positions their body between the ball and an attacking opponent, or otherwise blocks or checks an opponent, in order to prevent that opponent from reaching the ball. When the defensive player has control of the ball, this technique is known as shielding, and is permitted under the laws of the game.
- OFC – initialism for the Oceania Football Confederation, the governing body of the sport in Oceania.
- Offside – Law 11 of the laws of football, relating to the positioning of defending players in relation to attacking players when the ball is played to an attacking player by a teammate. In its most basic form, a player is offside if they are in their opponent's half of the field, and are closer to the goal line than both the second-last defender and the ball at the moment the ball is played to them by a teammate.
- Offside trap – defensive tactical maneuver, in which each member of a team's defense will simultaneously step forward as the ball is played forward to an opponent, in an attempt to put that opponent in an offside position. An unsuccessful performance of this maneuver results in the opponent "beating the offside trap".
- Olympic goal – goal scored directly from a corner kick.
- One touch – style of play in which the ball is passed around quickly using just one touch. Also used for the same type of training which aims to improve the speed of players' reaction when receiving the ball. See also Tiki-taka.
- One-club man – player who spends their entire professional career at one club. Opposite of journeyman.
- One-on-one – situation where the only player between an attacking player and the goal is the opponent's goalkeeper.
- One-two – skill move between teammates to move the ball past an opponent. Player One passes the ball to Player Two and runs past the opponent, whereupon they immediately receive the ball back from Player Two, who has received, controlled, and passed the ball in one movement. Also known as a give-and-go.
- Open goal – where no player is defending the goal.
- Opportunity – see chance.
- Outfield player – any player other than the goalkeeper.
- Outside forward – position used in a 2–3–5 formation, in which they are the main attacking threat from the flanks. Similar to modern wingers.
- Overhead kick – see Bicycle kick.
- Overlap – move between teammates. An attacking player (who has the ball) is shadowed by a single defender; the attacker's teammate runs past both players, forcing the defender to either continue to shadow the player on the ball, or attempt to prevent the teammate from receiving a pass. The first player can either pass the ball or keep possession, depending on which decision the defender makes.
- Own goal – where a player scores a goal against their own team, usually as the result of an error.

== P ==
A goalkeeper (black) defending a penalty kick

- Panenka – skill move used when taking a penalty kick wherein the player taking the penalty delicately chips the ball over a diving goalkeeper, rather than striking the ball firmly, as is the norm. Named after Antonín Panenka, who famously scored such a penalty for Czechoslovakia against West Germany in the final of the 1976 UEFA European Football Championship.
- Parachute payment – series of payments made for four years by the Premier League to every club relegated from that league.
- Paralympic football – consists of adaptations of the sport of association football for athletes with a disability. These sports are typically played using FIFA rules, with modifications to the field of play, equipment, numbers of players, and other rules as required to make the game suitable for the athletes. The two most prominent versions of Paralympic football are Football 5-a-side, for athletes with visual impairments, and Football 7-a-side, for athletes with cerebral palsy.
- Parking the bus – when all the players on a team play defensively, usually when the team is intending to draw the game or defending a narrow margin, as though almost going to such lengths as parking the (team) bus in front of the goal. The term was coined by manager José Mourinho, referring to Tottenham Hotspur during a game against his Chelsea side in 2004. See also Catenaccio.
- Pass – when a player kicks the ball to one of their teammates.
- Passive offside – exception to the offside rule, wherein play may continue if a player in an offside position makes no attempt to involve himself in the game at the moment an offside call would usually be made, and allows an onside player to win control of the ball instead. Also known by the term 'not interfering with play'.
- Penalty area – rectangular area measuring 44 yards (40.2 metres) by 18 yards (16.5 metres) in front of each goal.
- Penalty kick – kick taken 12 yards (11 metres) from goal, awarded when a team commits a foul inside its own penalty area, and the infringement would usually be punishable by a direct free kick.
- Penalty shootout – method of deciding a match in a knockout competition, which has ended in a draw after full-time and extra-time. Players from each side take it in turns to attempt to score a penalty against the opposition goalkeeper. Sudden death is introduced if scores are level after five penalties have been taken by either side. Also spelt penalty shoot-out.
- Perfect hat-trick – when a player scores three goals in a single match, one with the left foot, one with the right foot and one with a header.
- Phantom goal – see Ghost goal.
- Phoenix club – club which has been created following the demise of a pre-existing club. Phoenix clubs usually take on the same colours and fan base as those of the defunct club and may even be established by fans themselves.
- Pitch – playing surface for a game of football; usually a specially prepared grass field. Referred to in the Laws of the Game as the field of play.

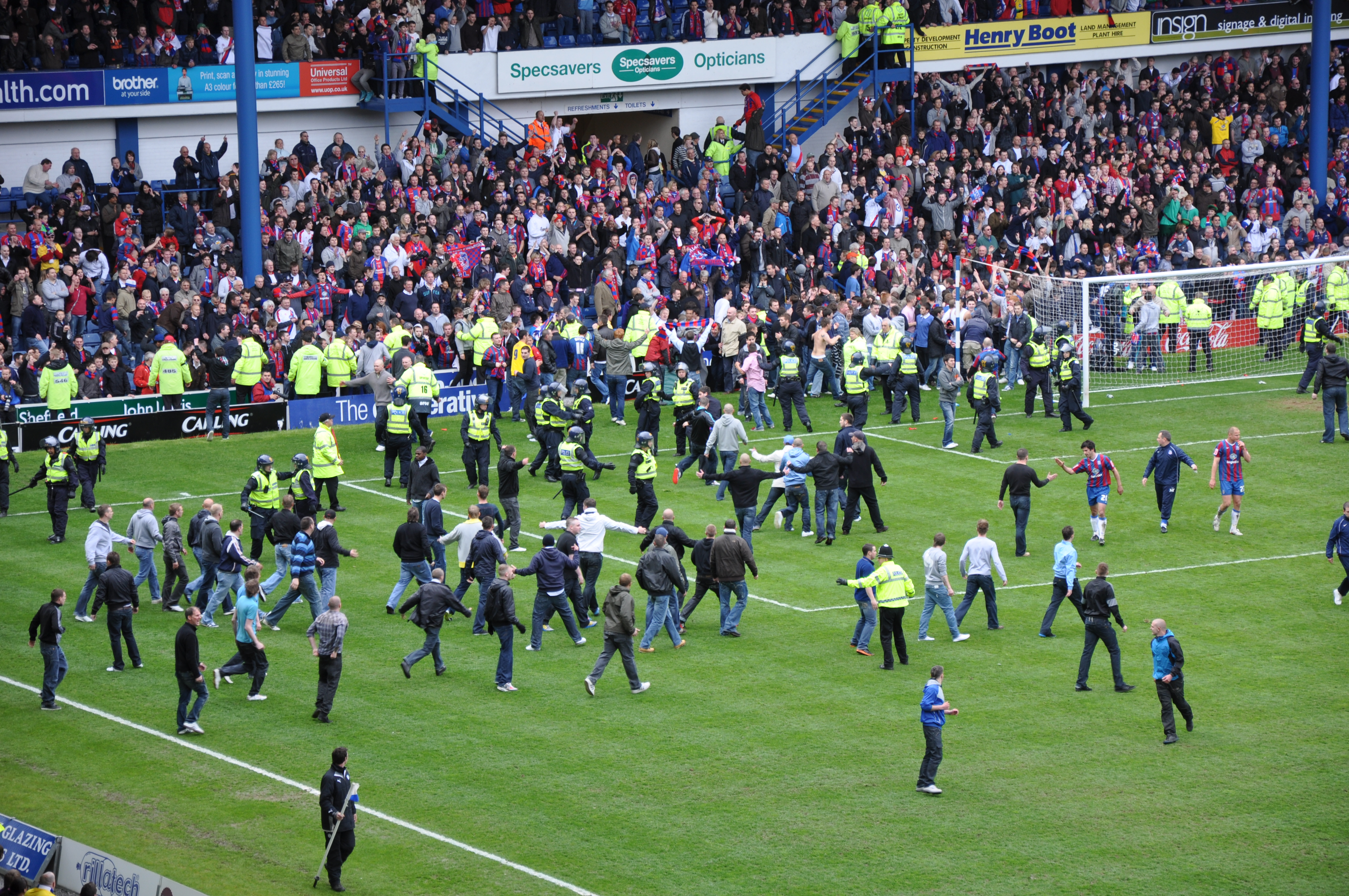
A pitch invasion

- Pitch invasion – when a crowd of people who are watching run onto the pitch to celebrate, protest about an incident or confront opposition fans. Known as rushing the field in the United States.
- Play-acting – similar to diving, play-acting is deceiving the officials that a player is injured to try to gain an advantage or force the referee to punish the "aggressor". Also known as feigning injury or Diving.
- Play to the whistle – an informal phrase used to instruct players to keep on playing until the referee blows their whistle.
- Players' tunnel – a passage through which football players walk to get to the pitch.
- Playing advantage – see advantage.
- Playmaker – attacking player whose job is to control the flow of their team's play.
- Playoff – series of matches towards the end of the season that determine clubs which are promoted and/or relegated, determine tied league positions or determine qualifiers for continental competitions. In some leagues, playoffs are also used to determine that season's champions.
- Pocket – when a player dominates their marked target for the majority of match, the marked player is said to have been pocketed. Usually applies to defenders dominating forwards.
- Points deduction – method of punishing clubs for breaching the rules of a tournament by reducing the number of accumulated points during a league season. Points deductions can be applied for offences such as going into administration, financial irregularities, fielding ineligible players, match fixing, or violent conduct amongst club staff or supporters.
- Post – see goalpost.
- The Poznań – celebration which involves fans turning their backs to the pitch, joining arms and jumping up and down in unison. It takes its name from Polish club Lech Poznań, whose fans are thought to be the first to celebrate in this way.
- Preseason – period leading up to the start of a league season. Clubs generally prepare for a new season with intensive training, playing various friendlies, and sometimes by attempting to sign new players.
- Premier League – name of the top division of English football since 1992. The phrase can also be used generically, or as a translation for leagues in other countries.
- Pressing – A tactic of defending players moving forward towards the ball, rather than remaining in position near their goal. They may pressure the player that has the ball or get close to other opponents in order to remove passing options. A successful press will recover the ball quickly and further up the pitch, or force the opponents to make an inaccurate long kick. However, if the opponents are able to pass the ball forward, fewer defending players are protecting the goal, making pressing a high-risk, high-reward strategy.
- Professional – player who is engaged by a club under a professional contract and who is paid a wage by the club to focus on their sport in lieu of other employment.
- Professional foul – foul committed by a player who is aware that they are about to intentionally commit the foul, and who does so having calculated the risk, and determined that committing the foul and taking a yellow card or even a red card will be more beneficial to their team than if the player allowed their opponent to continue unimpeded.
- Project Mbappé – concept in which parents have the fantasy objective of turning their child into a star footballer via intense coaching at an early age. The term came about as a social media phenomenon, and traces its name to French player Kylian Mbappé.
- Promedios – relegation system based on a points per game average over multiple seasons.
- Promotion – when a club moves up to a higher division in the league hierarchy as a result of being one of the best teams in their division at the end of a season.
- Pub team / pub league – see Sunday league football
- Pyramid – may refer to the 2–3–5 formation, or to a football pyramid, a hierarchical structure of leagues.

== R ==
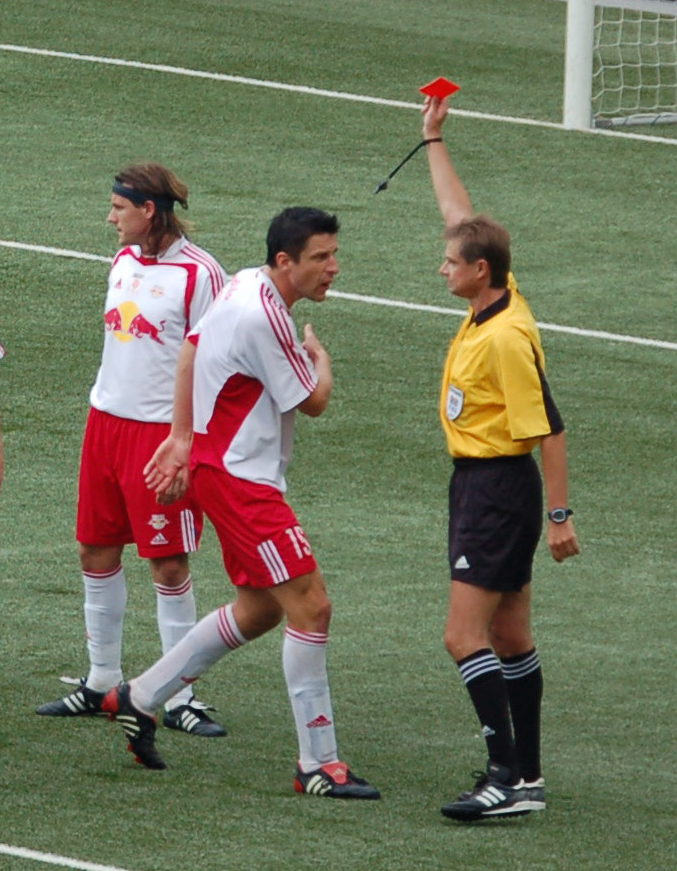
A referee (yellow/black) issuing a red card to a player (white/red)

- Rabona – method of kicking the football whereby the kicking leg is wrapped around the back of the standing leg.
- Recovery – (in defense) the transition from defensive pressure to a defensive block. See also Ball recovery and Injury recovery.
- Red card – awarded to a player for either a single serious cautionable offence or following two yellow cards. The player receiving the red card is compelled to leave the game for the rest of its duration, and that player's team is not allowed to replace him with another player. A player receiving the red card is said to have been sent off or ejected.
- Reducer – hard tackle, usually early in a game, meant to intimidate an attacking player.
- Referee – the official who presides over a match, with the help of assistant referees and the fourth official.
- Regulation time – the 90 minutes of regular playing time in a match, which does not include stoppage time or extra time.
- Relegation – relegation occurs when a club moves down to a lower division in the league hierarchy as a result of gaining the fewest points in their division at the end of a season.
- Replacement – see substitute.
- Reserve team – team which is considered supplemental to a club's senior team. Matches between reserve teams often include a combination of first team players that have not featured in recent games, as well as academy and trial players. While some nations restrict reserve teams to matches against one another in a separate system, others allow reserve teams (commonly suffixed with 'B' or 'II' to differentiate them from the senior team) to play in the same football pyramid as the senior team, but usually not allowed to move up to the same league level or play in the same cups, and with varying restrictions on the criteria of players used. Not to be confused with feeder clubs or farm teams which are separate clubs in a co-operative agreement. Some of the biggest clubs operate reserves, feeders and loans for their developing players.
- Retired number – squad number which is no longer used as a form of recognising an individual player's loyal service to the club. Sometimes a number is retired as a memorial after their death.
- Ronglish – phrases associated used by manager and pundit Ron Atkinson for an action during a match. Expressions used by Atkinson include similes and verbal non sequiturs.
- Round-robin tournament – competition in which each contestant meets all other contestants in turn. A competition where each team plays the other teams twice is known as a double round-robin.
- Rounding the 'keeper – attacking move in which a player attempts to dribble the ball around the goalkeeper, hoping to leave an open goal.
- Route one – direct, attacking style of football which generally involves taking the most direct route to goal.
- Roy of the Rovers stuff – event during a game, or an entire game, in which a player or team is seen to have overcome some sort of extreme adversity prior to victory, or secured victory in an overtly spectacular or dramatic fashion, especially against a team generally considered to be "stronger". The term originates from the long-running football-themed English comic strip Roy of the Rovers, in which such events were commonplace.
- Row Z – the hypothetical destination of a forceful clearance, on the assumption that rows in which spectators are seated are ordered alphabetically so that row Z is the furthest from the pitch. Also refers to a shot which goes a long way over the crossbar.

== S ==
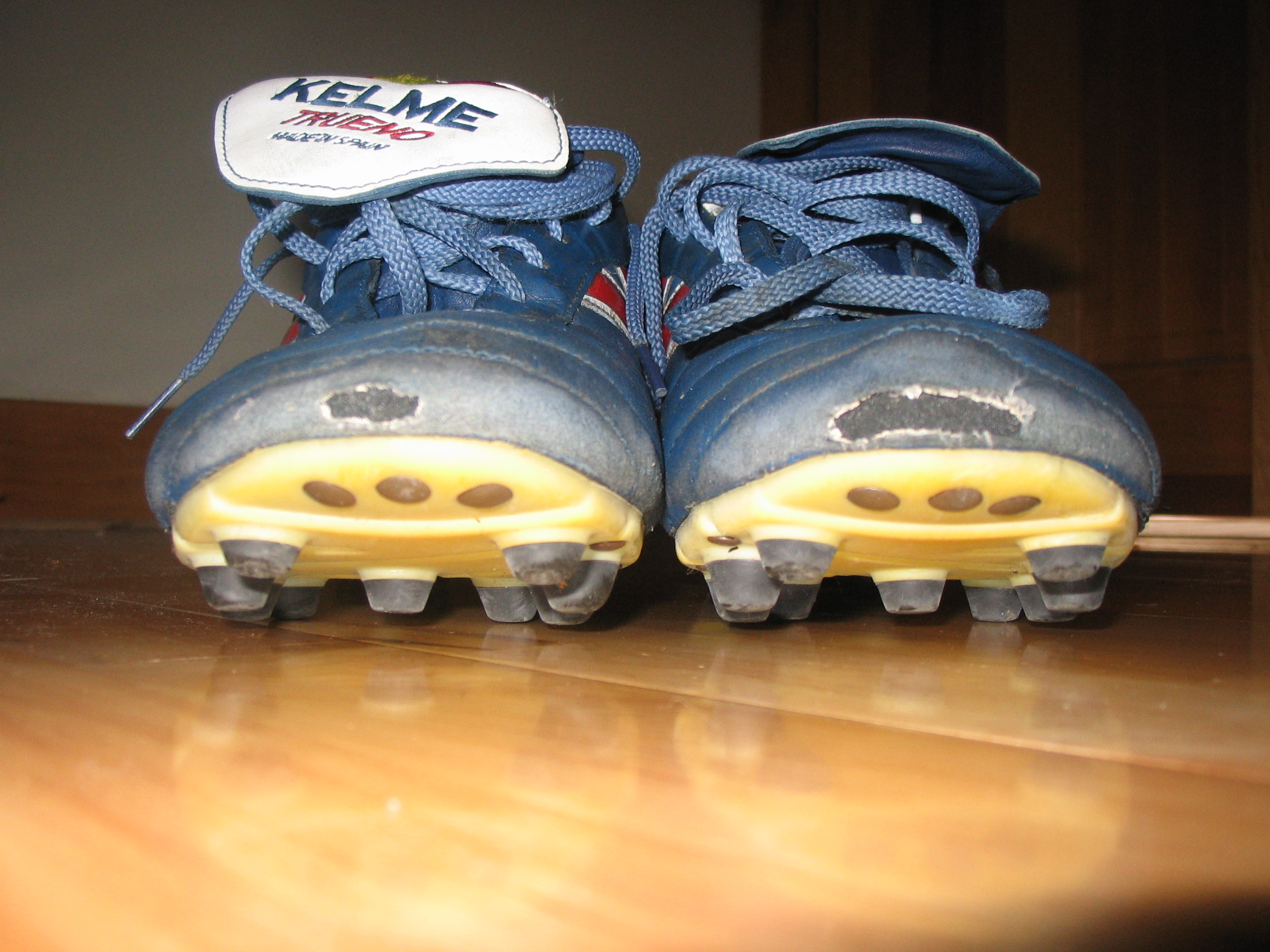
Football boots with moulded studs at the bottom

- Safety – see Survive.
- Save – when a goalkeeper prevents the football from crossing the goal line between the goalposts.
- Scissor kick – see Bicycle kick.
- Scorpion kick – acrobatic kick of the type first notably performed as a save by René Higuita in 1995 while playing for Colombia at Wembley stadium against England.
- Scratch – a term used in the nineteenth century to indicate a team had withdrawn from a competition and granting their opponents a walkover. Also used in horse racing.
- Screamer – a term used to describe a fiercely-hit shot on goal from long range.
- Scrimmage – a term used in the nineteenth century for what would now be called a goalmouth scramble. In the early days of newspaper coverage of the sport, reporters were often unable to identify the scorer of a goal under such circumstances and would report simply that the goal had been scored "from a scrimmage". For this reason, the scorers of several goals in early FA Cup finals are unknown.
- Seal dribble – type of dribble, in which a player flicks the ball up from the ground onto their head and then proceeds to run past opponents whilst bouncing the ball on top of their forehead, somewhat imitating a performing seal.
- Season – the time period during which primary competitions in a certain country are played. In most European countries the season starts around September and ends in May, with a winter break in December and January. In other countries the season is played within a single calendar year. It is often customary to use the Super Cup to mark the beginning of a season while the Cup final usually marks its end.
- Second season syndrome – phrase sometimes used by commentators in English football to refer to a downturn in fortunes for a football club two seasons after its promotion to the Premier League.
- Sending off – see red card.
- Separation – space that is found or created by an attacking player in the offensive run of play, either with or without possession of the ball.
- Set piece – dead ball routine that the attacking team has specifically practised, such as a free kick taken close to the D.
- Shielding – defensive technique, in which a defensive player positions their body between the ball and an attacking opponent, in order to prevent that opponent from reaching the ball. At all times while shielding the ball, the defender must maintain control of the ball within a nominal playing distance, otherwise the technique becomes obstruction, and a foul is called.
- Shin pads or Shin guards – mandatory piece of equipment, usually made of plastic or rubber, worn underneath the socks in order to protect the shins.
- Shoot – specialised kicking technique mainly used by forwards. The purpose of shooting is to get the ball past the goal line (usually beating the goalkeeper in the process), though some shots may be made in order to win corners or force the keeper to deflect the ball into the path of a teammate – this will only be the case if scoring directly from the shot seems unlikely. See Shooting (association football). To attempt to shoot is to take a shot.
- Shootout – see penalty shootout.
- Shutout – see Clean sheet.
- Side netting – outside of the net part of the goal, which stretches back from the goalpost to the stanchion.
- Silver goal – rule which was briefly in use between 2002 and 2004 in some UEFA competitions when elimination matches were level after 90 minutes. In extra time, the match would end if one team was winning after fifteen minutes of extra time. Unlike the golden goal, the game did not finish the moment a goal was scored.
- Silverware – a slang term for the trophies teams receive for winning competitions
- Simulation – see diving.
- Sitter – an instance when a player has a clear goal-scoring opportunity, but misses the shot. A sitter is often characterized by an open-goal miss.
- Six-a-side football – variant of association football adapted for play in an arena such as a turf-covered hockey arena or a skating rink. Unlike in futsal the playing field is surrounded by a wall instead of touch lines. The ball can be played directly off the wall, which eliminates many frequent stoppages that would normally result in throw-ins, goal kicks and corner kicks. Played by two teams with 6 players each. Also known as arena soccer, indoor football, indoor soccer or simply as six-a-side.
- Six-pointer – game between teams both competing for a title, promotion, or relegation, whereby the relative difference between winning and losing can be six points.
- Slide tackle – type of tackle where the defending player slides along the ground to tackle their opponent.
- Soccer – alternative name for the sport of association football. Originating in Britain, and derived from the "s-o-c" in "association", the word was commonly used in the UK until the 1970s. Now it is used most commonly in countries where the term "football" is used to refer to a different code, for instance American football in the United States, and Australian rules football and rugby league in Australia, as well as in Ireland at such times when confusion with Gaelic football may occur. See also: Names for association football.
- Soft – term that indicates the referee made a potentially wrong decision regarding a foul. Can also be used to say easy or weak.
- Spion Kop – see Kop.
- Spot-kick – see penalty-kick.
- Squad numbers – numerical markings on players' shirts used to distinguish individual players in a game of football. First used in 1928, and initially assigned to distinguish positions in a formation, they gradually became associated with individual players, irrespective of where they are positioned on the pitch. This gave rise to the custom of retiring numbers.
- Squad rotation system – managerial device, whereby the manager selects from a large number of players in first team games, rather than having a regular first eleven.
- Square ball – when a ball is passed between teammates laterally, across the field of play.
- Squeaky-bum time – tense final stages of a league competition, especially from the point of view of the title contenders, and clubs facing promotion and relegation. The phrase was allegedly coined by Manchester United manager Alex Ferguson.
- Stanchion – part of the framework of the goal which holds the upper rear part of the net in the air and away from the crossbar.
- Step over or stepover – skill move performed by an attacking player in which the player with the ball will move their foot over the ball without making contact with it. The intent of the move is to confuse a defender into thinking that the attacking player is moving with the ball in a certain direction; when the defender changes direction, the attacker will quickly change direction.
- Stoppage-time – an additional number of minutes at the end of each half, determined by the match officials, to compensate for time lost during the game. Informally known by various names, including injury time and added time.
- Straight red – a penalty given by the referee in punishment for a serious offence that is deemed to be worse than a booking and results in immediate sending off of a player
- Street football – informal variations of the sport. Games often forgo many requirements of a formal game of football, such as a large field, field markings, goal apparatus and corner flags, eleven players per team, or match officials (referee and assistant referees). Synonymous with jumpers for goalposts.
- Striker – one of the four main positions in football. Strikers are the players closest to the opposition goal, with the principal role of scoring goals. Also known as forward or attacker.
- Studs – small points on the underneath of a player's boots to help prevent slipping. A tackle in which a player directs their studs towards an opponent is referred to as a studs-up challenge, and is a foul punishable by a red card.
- Stunner – see screamer.
- Substitute – a player who is brought on to the pitch during a match in exchange for an existing player.
- Subbed – A player who is withdrawn from the field of play and replaced by a substitute is said to have been subbed or subbed off. An oncoming substitute may be referred to as being subbed on.
- Sudden death – feature of penalty shootouts. If scores are level after each side has taken the standard five penalties, the teams continue to take one kick each until one scores and the other misses, at which point the shootout immediately ends.
- Super Hat-trick – when a player scores four goals in a single match.
- Supporter – see fan.
- Sunday league football – term used mainly in the British Isles in respect of amateur leagues played on Sunday rather than the more usual Saturday, often generalised as being of very low quality and including unfit or hungover players in teams representing public houses ("pub leagues"); organisational standards and skill levels actually vary greatly. Also used in a derogatory sense to deride professional teams' poor performances, or entire leagues seen as weak (often by English observers of Scottish football). See also: farmers league.
- Survive – when a team at risk of relegation secures enough points to guarantee their position in that league for the following season. Also known as securing safety.
- Suspension – a punishment under which players are not permitted to play in one or more of their team's games if they are sent off or reach a specified total number of bookings in previous games
- Sweeper – defender whose role is to protect the space between the goalkeeper and the rest of the defence. Also referred to as libero.

== T ==
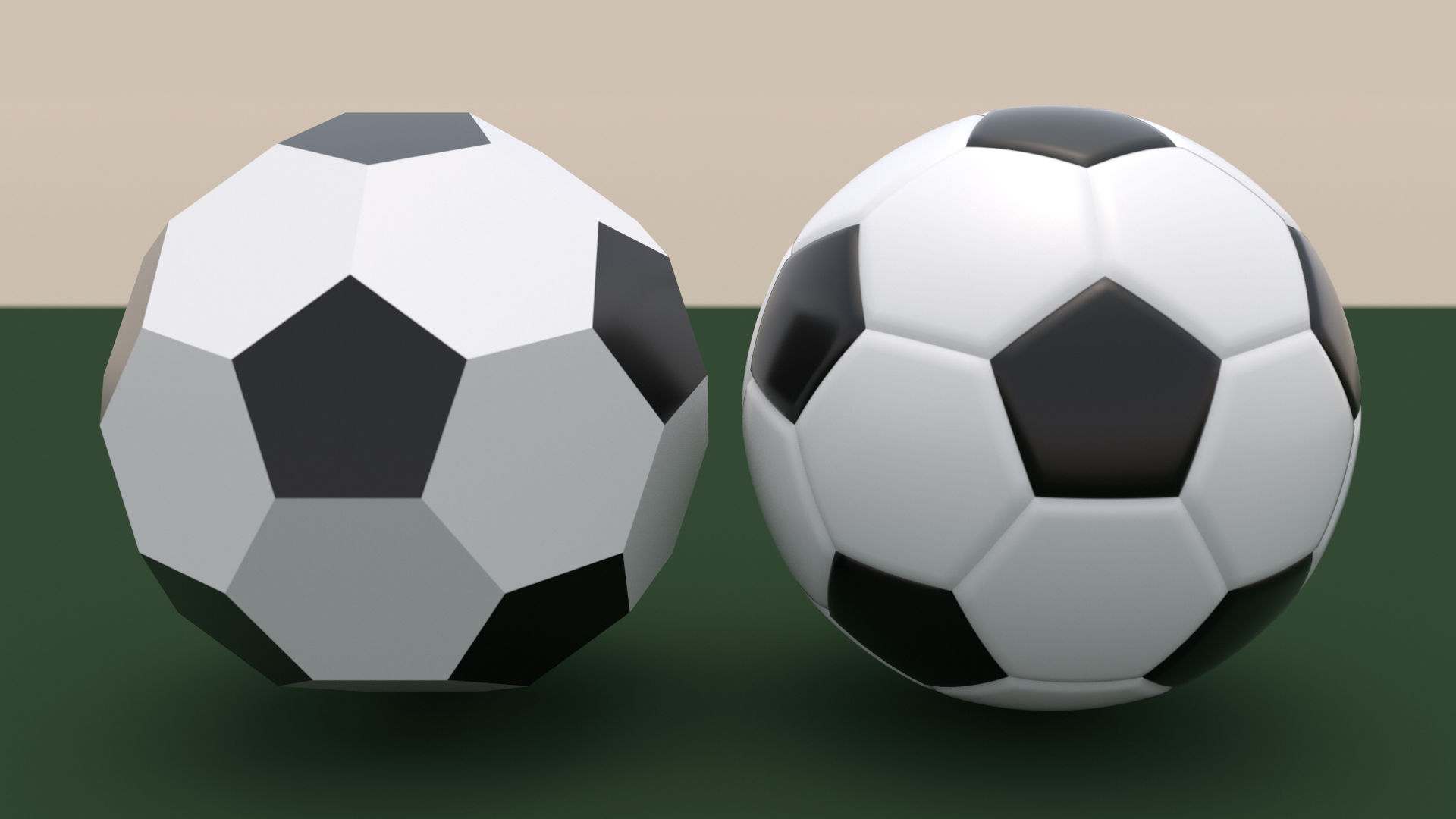
A truncated icosahedron (left) compared to a telstar football

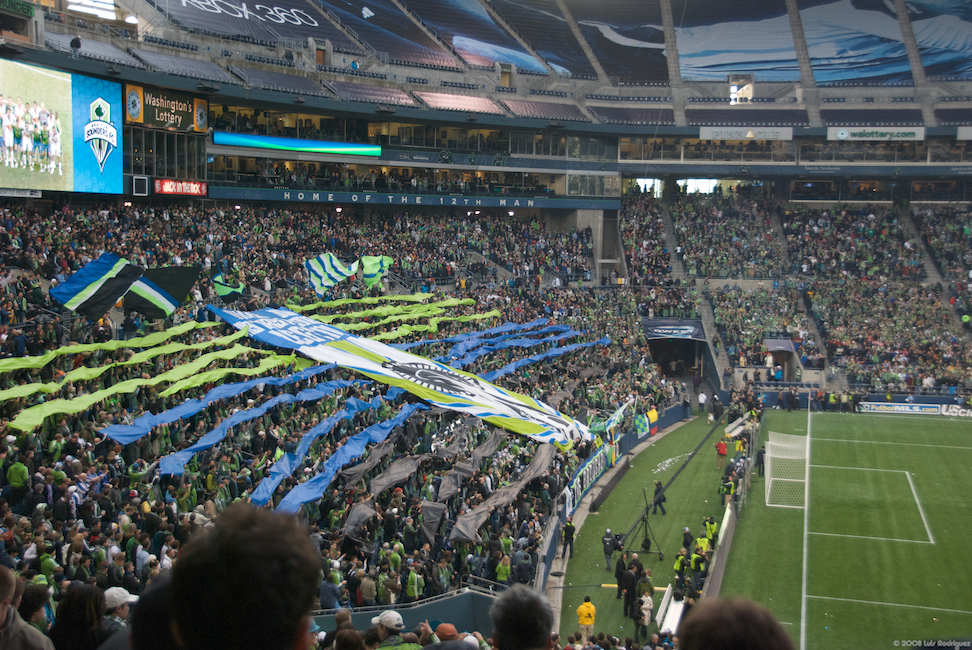
Seattle Sounders FC supporters displaying a tifo

- Tackle – method of a player winning the ball back from an opponent, achieved either by using a leg to wrest possession from the opponent, or making a slide tackle to knock the ball away. A tackle in which the opposing player is kicked before the ball is punishable by either a free kick or penalty kick. Dangerous tackles may also result in a yellow or red card. See also reducer.
- Tactical foul – see Professional foul.
- (to) Take a touch – to control the ball with a legal part of the body before passing or shooting.
- (it) Takes a touch – when the ball, often unintentionally, takes a deflection off a player to alter its intended trajectory.
- Tactical periodization – football training methodology developed around 35 years ago by Vítor Frade, a sports science professor from Porto University in Portugal.
- Target man – type of striker. Usually tall, with a strong build and good heading ability, capable of controlling or attacking balls in the air. Target men give the forward line different options in how to attack the goal, and are often used to hold up the ball or play layoff passes to their teammates.
- Taylor Report – document written by Lord Taylor concerning the causes and aftermath of the Hillsborough disaster in 1989. Best known for its recommendation that top division stadiums in England and Scotland phase out their terraces and become all-seater.
- Technical area – area within which the manager must remain while coaching their team during a match, marked by white lines at the side of the pitch.
- Telstar – match ball designed by Adidas for the 1970 FIFA World Cup. The first ball to use a truncated icosahedron design, with 12 black and 20 white patches intentionally used to improve visibility on black-and-white TV sets. The design remains common in club crests and decorations, even though modern match balls look considerably different. Known as bubamara (ladybug) in countries where Serbo-Croatian is spoken.
- Terrace – standing area of a stadium, consisting of a series of concrete steps which are erected for spectators to stand on. Often occupied by ultras. Terraces have been phased out in some countries, over safety concerns.
- Testimonial match – friendly match organised in honour of a player due to long service, usually 10 years at a single club.
- Third man running – when a team is attacking, in addition to the passer and intended receiver of the ball, a player will take part in the movement as an alternative receiver or third man. On completion of the move, the passer will become the third man.
- Three points for a win – point system in which three points are awarded to the team winning a match, with no points to the losing team. If the game is drawn, each team receives one point. Replacing the previous convention of two points awarded for wins and one point for draws, the system is intended to encourage teams to attack in search of a win, rather than settle for a draw.
- Through-ball – pass from the attacking team that goes straight through the opposition's defence to a teammate. Invariably the teammate will run onto the ball – standing behind the defenders when the ball was played would result in offside being called.
- Throw-in – method of restarting play. Involves a player throwing the ball from behind a touchline after it has been kicked out by an opponent.
- Tie – see cup tie
- Tifo – originally the Italian word for the phenomenon of supporting a football team, today mainly used for any spectacular choreography displayed by supporters on the terraces of a stadium in connection with an association football match. Primarily arranged by ultras.
- Tiki-taka – style of play characterised by short passing and movement, working the ball through various channels and maintaining possession. The style is primarily associated with Spanish club Barcelona and the Spain national team. See also One touch.
- Toe punt – method of kicking the ball with the tip of the foot. Also known as a toe poke.
- Too good to go down – belief, often misguided, that the ability within a team will preclude it from relegation.
- Top corner – the parts of the goal immediately below the two 90° angles where the crossbar and posts intersect. Generally considered the most difficult part of the goal for a goalkeeper to reach.
- Top flight – the league at the highest level of a league system.
- Total Football – tactical theory in which any outfield player can take over the role of any other player in a team. Invented by the Dutch coach Rinus Michels, Total Football was popularised by Ajax and the Netherlands national team in the early 1970s.
- Touch-line – markings along the side of the pitch, indicating the boundaries of the playing area. Throw-ins are taken from behind this line.
- Tracksuit manager – a manager who has a tendency to work with players on the training ground, spending a significant amount of time on improving players' abilities.
- Transfer window – period during the year in which a football club can transfer players from other countries into their playing staff.
- Trap – skill performed by a player, whereupon the player uses their foot (or, less commonly, their chest or thigh) to bring an airborne or falling ball under control.
- Travelling army – expression used by commentators for any set of away fans – that is, fans who travelled to the match to support their team. Often a team's travelling army are referred to as the 12th man.
- Treble – achieved by a club that wins three major trophies in a single season. Competitions generally considered as part of a treble include the top tier domestic league, domestic cup and continental cup. Trebles achieved without winning a continental competition are known as domestic trebles. UEFA defines a European Treble as the feat of winning all three seasonal club confederation competitions.
- Trialist – player who represents a club on a trial basis, often in the hope of being offered a contract.
- Two-footed tackle – challenge where a player, often a defender, tackles their opponent with both feet. Such tackles often result in a foul being called, if the tackling player is deemed not to be in control of their body.

== U ==
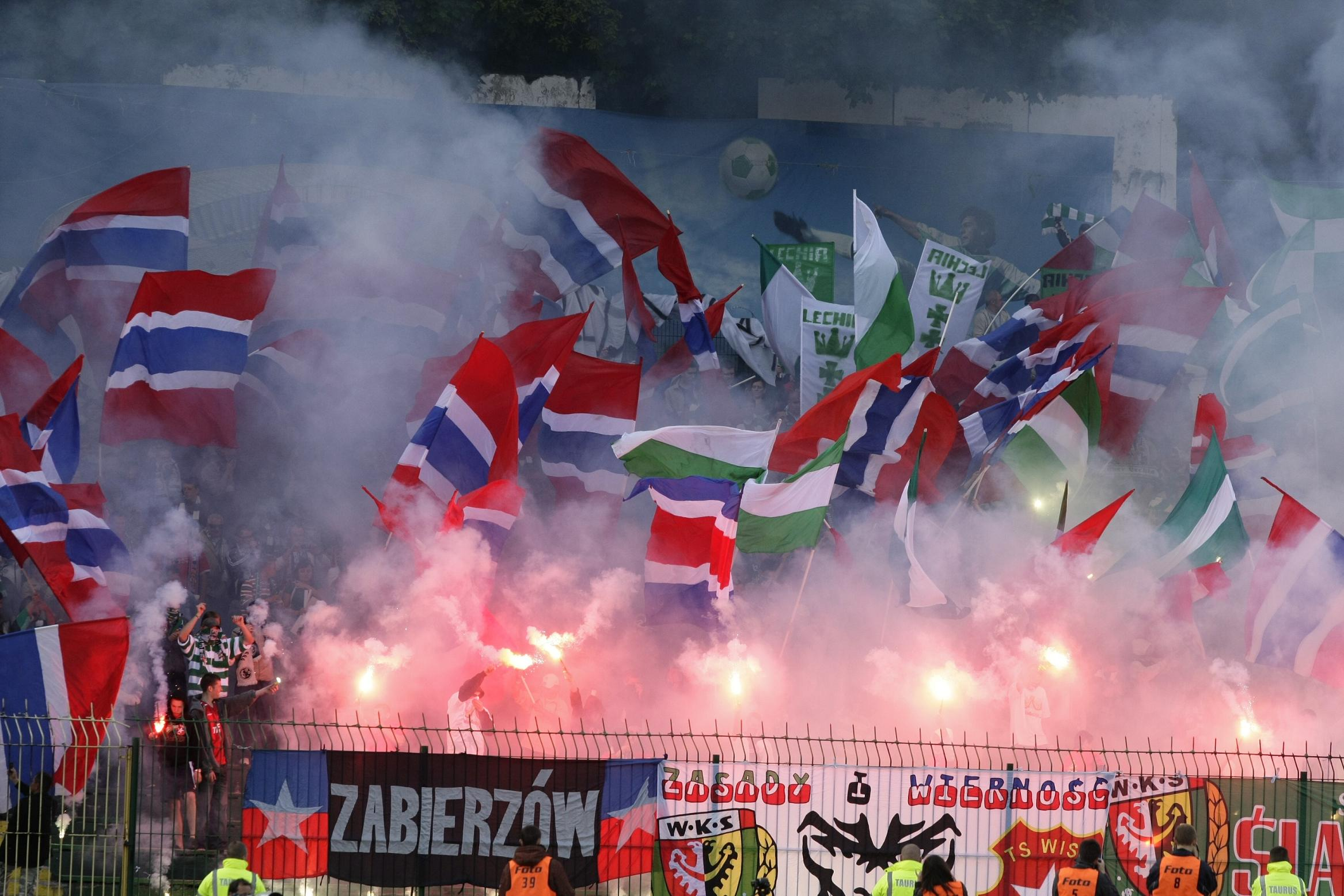
Ultras in Poland

- UEFA – acronym for Union of European Football Associations, the governing body of the sport in Europe; pronounced "you-eh-fa".
- Underdog – the team that is not expected to win a particular game or competition.
- Under the cosh – a team's defence experiences a period of concerted or unrelenting attacking play.
- Ultras – type of football fans predominantly found in Europe renowned for their fanatical support and elaborate displays at football matches. These displays often include the use of flares, vocal support in large groups, displays of banners at stadium terraces and other forms of tifo choreography.
- Upset – game in which the underdog defeats a higher ranked team.
- Utility player – player who can be used in different positions or for different roles transcending the traditional division of outfield players into defenders, midfielders and strikers.

== V ==
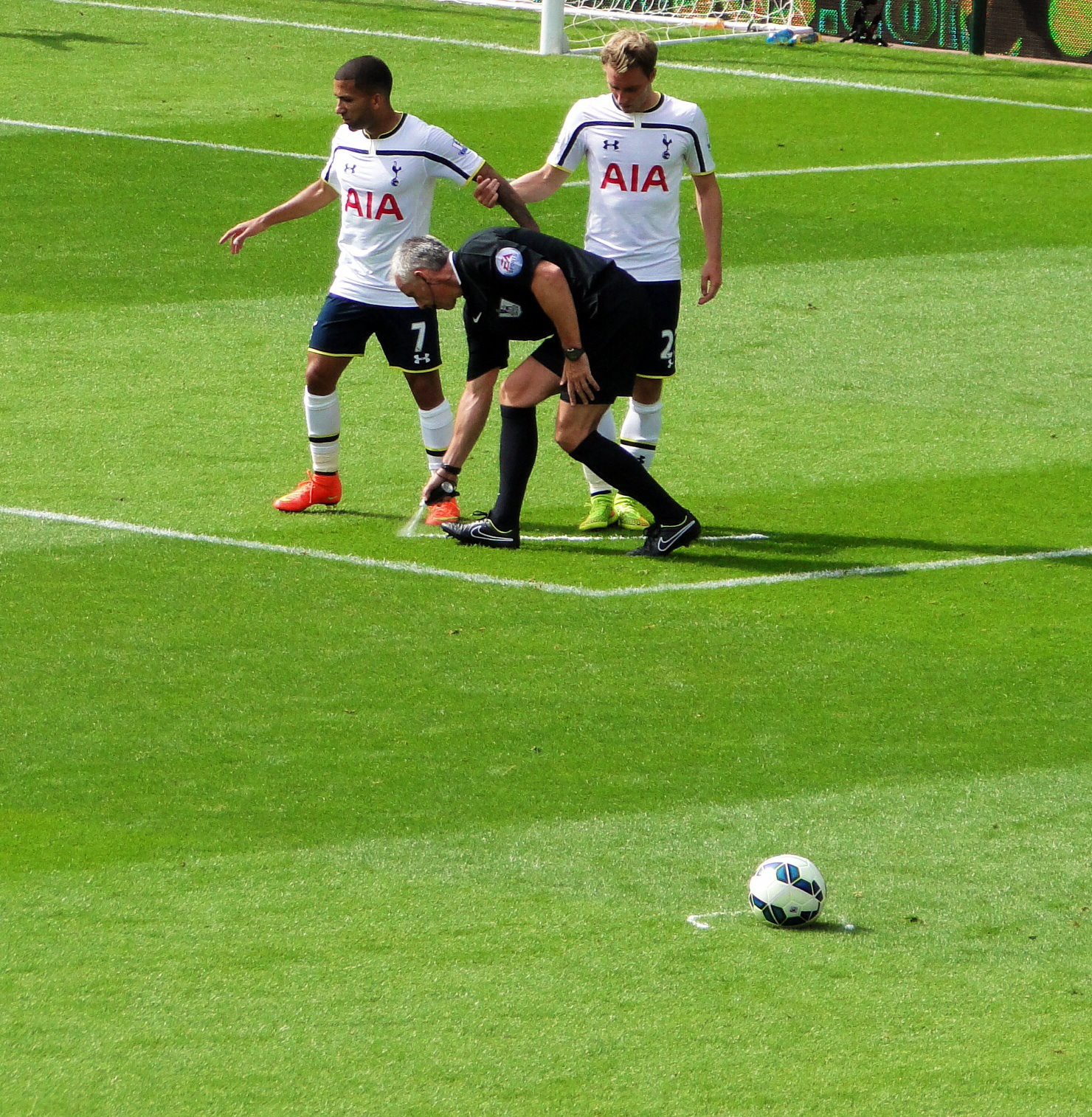
Vanishing spray in use

- Vanishing spray – short-lasting aerosol paint applied to the grass by the referee to mark the 10 yard exclusion area at a free kick.
- Video assistant referee (VAR) – a long-campaigned method of determining close decisions, such as whether a ball crosses the goalline, using instant replays provided by cameras located at several angles. It was officially included into the Laws of the Game in 2018.
- Volley – pass or shot in which the ball is struck before it touches the ground.
- Vuvuzela – plastic horn-shaped instruments popularised by supporters at the 2010 FIFA World Cup in South Africa.

== W ==
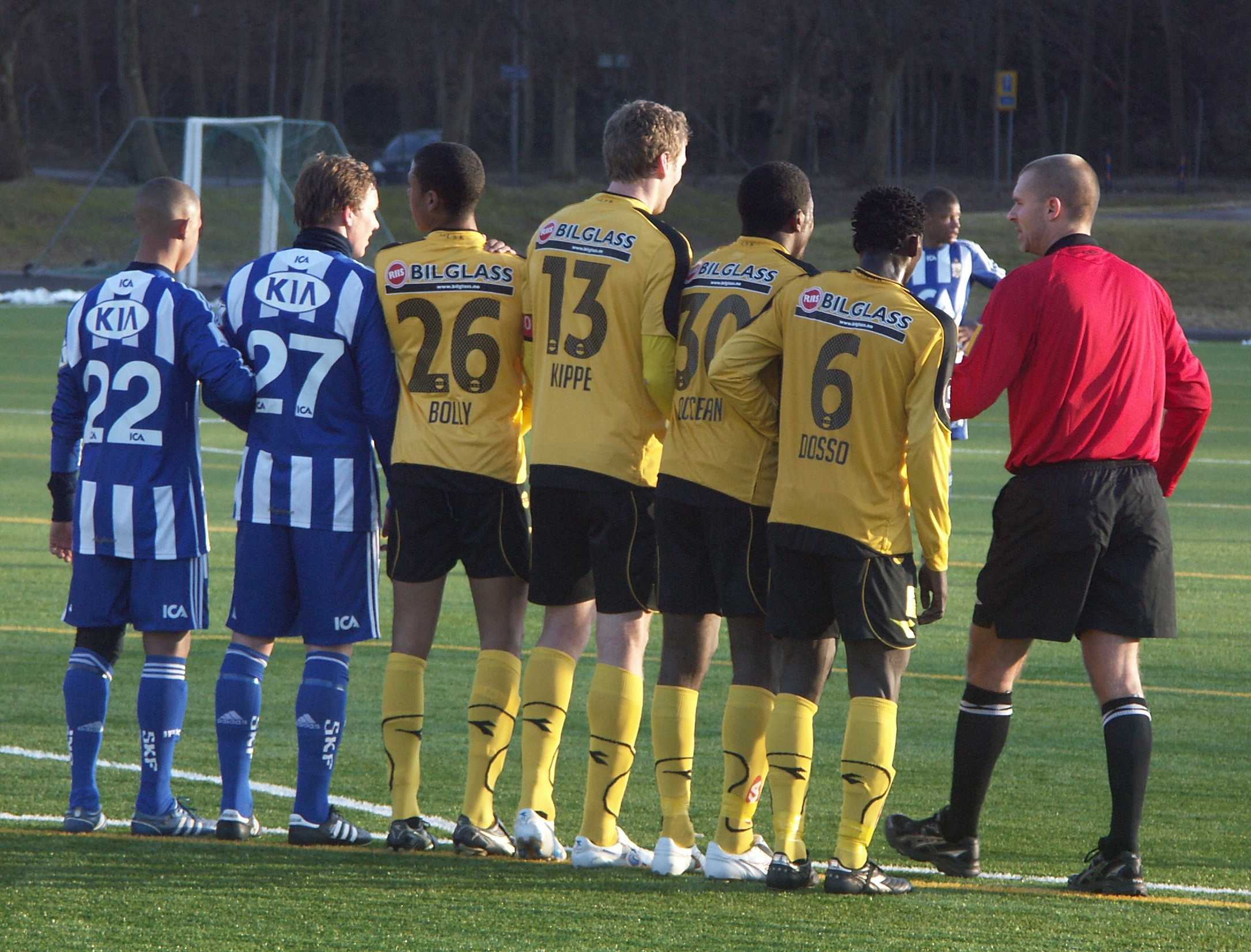
A referee (red) ensuring a wall is correctly lined up

- Wall or defensive wall – row of defensive players who line up 10 yards away from a free kick, covering a portion of the goal, with the intent making it more difficult for an attacking player to have a shot on goal direct from the free kick.
- Want-away – player who has made public their intentions to leave their current club.
- War chest – the amount of money a manager has been given by a club's chairman, owner or investors to acquire new players.
- Webster ruling – 2006 court case which stipulated that players are able to unilaterally walk away from a contract after a fixed period, regardless of the duration of the contract itself. Named after Andy Webster. Compare Bosman ruling.
- Wing – area of the pitch that runs parallel to the sidelines.
- Winger – wide midfield player whose primary focus is to provide crosses into the penalty area. Alternatively known as a wide midfielder.
- Winter break – period between December and January in which competitive football is suspended and which cuts some national or continental seasons in half. Known as "year-end" or "summer break" in the Southern Hemisphere.
- Winter champions – a team at the top of the table during the winter break, halfway through the season.
- Withdrawn – A forward or attacking midfielder who plays deeper than the name of their conventional position suggests. A forward or attacking midfielder who drops deep may be described as playing in a withdrawn role. Withdrawn may also be used to refer to a player who has been substituted: "the injured midfielder was withdrawn on the hour mark".
- Woodwork – the posts and the crossbar, commonly used in phrases like "the ball came back off the woodwork", meaning a shot at goal struck either the post or the crossbar and remained in play. The expression is still widely used even though goals are no longer made of wood.
- Worldy – a goal which is considered to be world class, e.g. "he scored with a worldy". Also used to describe what is considered to be a world-class performance by a player not well known in the game, playing at a lower level.
- Work rate – the extent to which a player contributes to running and chasing in a match while not in possession of the ball. Sometimes spelt workrate or work-rate.
- World Cup – Associated with the FIFA World Cup, FIFA Women's World Cup, international tournaments for youth football, (such as the FIFA U-20 World Cup), and also the FIFA Club World Cup.

== X ==
- xG - see Expected goals
- X-rated challenge – malicious tackle when a player has possible motivation to injure an opponent.

== Y ==
- Yellow card – shown by the referee to a player who commits a cautionable offence. If a player commits two cautionable offences in a match, they are shown a second yellow card, followed by a red card, and are then sent off. Also known as a caution or a booking.
- Youth – a player (or team of players) contracted under the youth system, generally under the age of 18 and not playing professionally although youth players can appear for the first-team. Also known as an "apprentice".
- Youth academy – see academy.
- Yo-yo club – club that is regularly promoted and relegated between higher and lower league levels. Also known in other languages as elevator team, for instance Fahrstuhlmannschaften in German.

== Z ==
- Zonal marking – system of marking, in which each player is responsible for an area of the pitch, rather than an opposing player.
- Zona mista – (Italian pronunciation: [ˈdzɔːna ˈmista]), tactical theory in which any outfield player can make simultaneously use of defensive individual marking related to catenaccio, the zonal game and continuous attack on the spaces characteristic from total football. The introduction of this system in Italian football has been attributed to Gigi Radice and Giovanni Trapattoni, being popularised by Juventus and the Italy national team in the late 1970s and early 1980s.

== See also ==
- Association football tactics and skills
- List of association football club rivalries by country
- List of association football clubs
- List of association football competitions
- List of association football media
- List of association football people by nickname
- List of sports terms named after people
- Variants of association football
