= Goal of the Month =

Goal of the Month may refer to:

- A-League Goal of the Month, as decided by the A-League
- BBC Goal of the Month, as decided by the BBC's Match of the Day programme
- Goal of the Month (Germany), as decided by ARD's Sportschau programme
- Premier League Goal of the Month, as decided by the Premier League
- Serie A Goal of the Month, as decided by the Serie A
- La Liga Goal of the Month, as decided by La Liga

== See also ==
- Goal of the century, several goals in several sports
- Goal of the Decade
- Goal of the Season (disambiguation)
- Goal of the Year (disambiguation)
