= Goal of the Season =

Goal of the Season may refer to:

- BBC Goal of the Season, English football accolade awarded by the BBC
- Goal of the Season (Ireland), Irish football accolade awarded by the Irish media
- Premier League Goal of the Season, English football accolade awarded by the Premier League
- MLS Goal of the Year Award, American football accolade awarded by the Major League Soccer

== See also ==
- Goal of the century
- Goal of the Decade
- Goal of the Year (disambiguation)
- Goal of the Month (disambiguation)
