= Goal of the Decade =

Goal of the Decade may refer to:

- Premier League Goal of the Decade, an association football award from the British Premier League
- Sportschau Goal of the Decade, an association football award from the German TV channel Sportschau

== See also ==
- Goal of the century
- Goal of the Year (disambiguation)
- Goal of the Season (disambiguation)
- Goal of the Month (disambiguation)
