= Goal of the Year =

Goal of the Year may refer to:

- Goal of the Year (AFL), Australian Football League (Australian rules football), first awarded in 1970
- Goal of the Year (Germany), Bundesliga (football), selected by ARD German TV, first awarded in 1971
- MLS Goal of the Year Award, Major League Soccer, first awarded in 1996

== See also ==
- Goal of the Month (disambiguation)
- Goal of the Season (disambiguation)
- Goal of the Decade
- Goal of the century
- Mark of the Year
- FIFA Puskás Award
