= Game 39 =

Proposed extra round in English football's Premier League

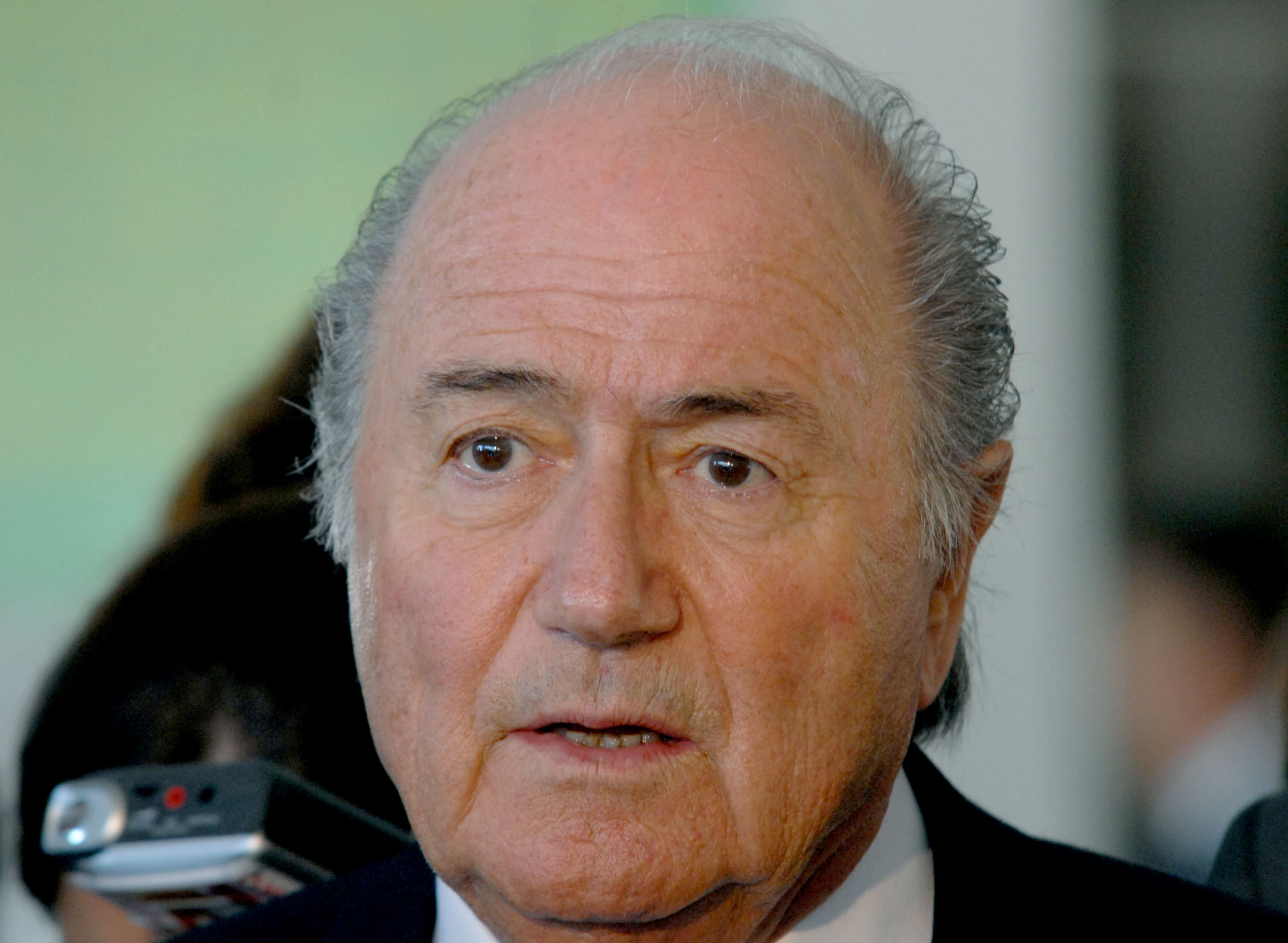
Sepp Blatter, then president of FIFA, football's world governing body, strongly opposed the highly controversial "game 39" proposal.

"Game 39" or the international round was a proposed extra round of matches in the Premier League to be played at neutral venues outside England. The top football league in England, the Premier League, is played on a double round robin format, where each of the 20 teams in the league plays each of the other 19 teams home and away, giving a total of 380 games, 38 for each team. The international round was proposed at a meeting of the 20 Premier League clubs on 7 February 2008, with a view to being introduced for the 2010–11 season, when a new television broadcasting rights contract would be in place. The proposed start date was later put back to 2013–14. The proposal was reportedly endorsed by the chairmen of a number of Premier League clubs.

Game 39 resulted in opposition from several club managers. The proposal also met with strong condemnation from supporters' organisations, who saw it as solely motivated by money to the detriment of fans. Sepp Blatter, then-president of the sport's global governing body FIFA, expressed a negative opinion of the proposal and stated that it could affect England's bid to host the 2018 World Cup, and the football authorities in a number of the areas suggested as venues for the matches were also opposed. In May 2010, the Premier League said that it was no longer actively considering game 39, but in October 2014 it was said to be re-considering the idea.

== Proposal ==
The Premier League, the top-level football league in England, contains 20 member clubs, with each playing the others once at home and once away for a total of 38 games per season. The proposal envisaged each team playing one further match, a total of ten extra matches, over one weekend in January. Two matches would be played in each of five cities, one each on Saturday and Sunday. Cities would bid for the right to stage matches, but would not be able to specify which teams would be involved. The matches would be held at staggered start times, with venues in different time zones, making it possible in theory to watch live television coverage of all ten. There are conflicting reports about whether the draw for the extra fixtures would be seeded or not.

The week prior to the international round would be free of matches, to allow for travel and acclimatisation. The week after the international round would see each team face one of the teams which had played at the same foreign venue, to avoid any disadvantage for teams with a longer round-trip. Venues suggested for international-round matches were Australia, East Asia, Southeast Asia, the Gulf States, and North America. All are wealthy regions where interest in English football is strong relative to the level of the domestic game. Venues would have warm, predictable weather, unlike England in January.

Premier League chief executive Richard Scudamore initially said there would not be more than one international round per season, stating "I stress that on my watch, there will be no 40th game. The value [of a 39th game] is in its uniqueness, in that festival weekend, so there's no point in diluting it". Subsequently, he suggested the initial plan would last six to ten years and might be altered.

== Development ==
Foreshadowing the plan were the Premier League Asia Trophy, started in 2003, and the NFL International Series American football game played at Wembley Stadium in London in 2007. Rod Eddington pitched the idea of an international round to the Premier League in autumn 2007. Eddington was chairman of Victorian Major Events Company and a friend of Rupert Murdoch, owner of Sky Sports and other networks with broadcasting rights to the Premier League. He suggested his home city of Melbourne as an inaugural host city. A presentation to the Premier League's audit-and-remuneration committee was made two weeks before the public announcement. An initial business plan predicted extra earnings from the international round of between £40 million and £80 million per year.

The Premier League put in place a working party to negotiate with the various concerned parties. They initially stated that, to proceed with the plan, it needed the support only of the Football Association (FA) and the football governing bodies of the countries of the host cities. It attempted to secure the support of the FA for the proposal by promising to rearrange club fixtures for better convenience to players called up to the England team. Scudamore planned to meet officials from the sport's global governing body FIFA, before its executive committee meeting in Zürich on 14 March 2008. On 27 February, after several weeks of mostly negative reaction, Scudamore agreed with Jérôme Valcke, general secretary of FIFA, that the meeting would be postponed indefinitely. The Premier League presented this as an opportunity to rethink its proposals, and said that it would not proceed without FIFA approval.

In May 2008, Scudamore told BBC Radio 5 Live that the proposal was "not over", but that the League would "come up with something that ticks more boxes" by January 2009. In August 2008, Scudamore said that the League had "a whole host of ideas, some more radical than others, but none quite as radical as the original concept". In October 2008, he said Game 39 was still a possibility, although the timing of TV contracts meant it would be in the 2013–14 season at the earliest. An agreement in December 2008 between the Premier League and the Asian Football Confederation (AFC) was linked to Game 39 by the media.

== Reactions ==
=== In England ===
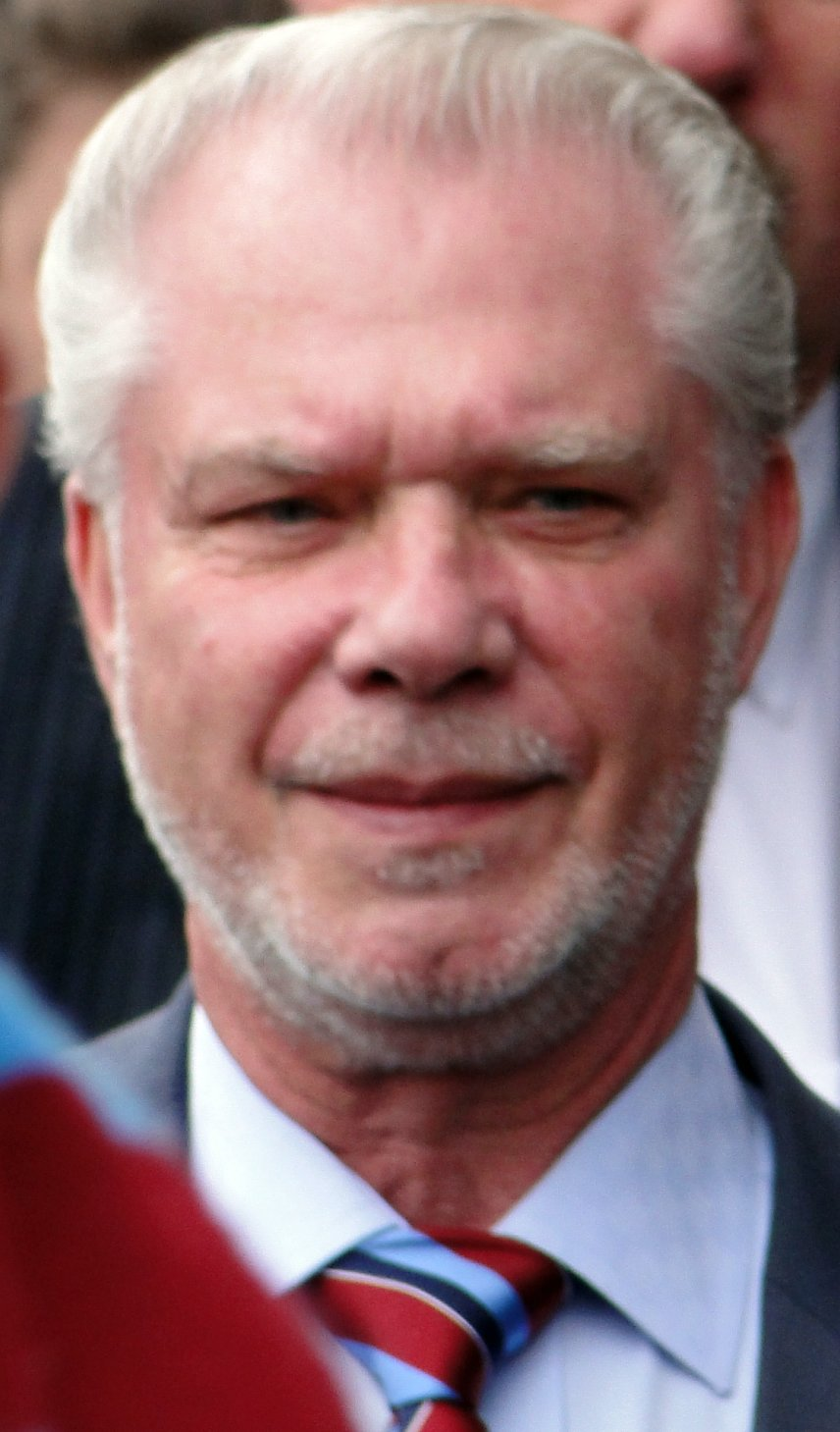
David Gold, then chairman of Birmingham City, endorsed the idea.

David Gold, chairman of Birmingham City, endorsed the plan in part because the larger clubs have in any case already been exploiting foreign markets, with pre-season and even mid-season tours; Game 39 would distribute its revenue among all the clubs. On 15 February, Liverpool F.C. chief executive Rick Parry stated that the proposal had "never been on Liverpool's club agenda" and acknowledged the concern of the club's fans and manager. Paul Hayward, writing in The Guardian, said that the proposal would destroy the balance of the home-and-away round-robin league. The Football Supporters' Federation (FSF) condemned the proposal as being motivated by money, and dubbed it "Gam£39". In March 2008, FSF ended its campaign of opposition by declaring the proposal "effectively dead". Many die-hard fans who pride themselves on travelling to all their teams' away matches would have been unable to travel abroad for "Game 39". On the other hand, exotic foreign venues would potentially be more appealing destinations for fans than a mundane English city. Managers of Premier League clubs reported to be opposed to or sceptical of the plans included Steve Bruce, Roy Hodgson, Gareth Southgate, and Rafael Benítez. Alex Ferguson criticised the club owners for lack of consultation with managers. Arsène Wenger, Roy Keane, Kevin Keegan, and Avram Grant supported the proposal. 'Game 39' was also defended as a move to head off plans for a World League involving only elite clubs such as those formerly in the G-14 group.

Andy Burnham, the Secretary of State for Culture, Media and Sport, cautioned that football should "not forget its roots". Gordon Taylor of the Professional Footballers' Association expressed concern about increased pressure on players. The FA on 15 February expressed "serious reservations" that the proposal might damage England's bid to host the 2018 World Cup. An FA board meeting on 21 February concluded that the plan was "unsustainable in its current format".

=== Elsewhere ===
The proposal was condemned by Sepp Blatter, president of FIFA, who said it brought the game into disrepute and would adversely affect England's bid for the 2018 World Cup. He also said "Football cannot be like the Harlem Globetrotters or a circus". Michel Platini of the sport's European governing body, UEFA, called it a "nonsense idea". Strong reservations were expressed by the Korean FA, and the Japanese FA opposed the plan. Middle-eastern FAs were reportedly more positive. In February 2008 AFC president Mohammed bin Hammam said he would "vote strongly against" the proposal; in June he was prepared to reconsider if the plan had FA support; in October he said he would welcome it if the League shared revenue with the AFC. The Hong Kong FA said it was "very interested" in hosting games. Football Federation Australia said it would oppose it if it impacted its own A-League. Ivan Gazidis, deputy commissioner of Major League Soccer (MLS) in the United States, said that MLS would welcome the plan if it had FIFA approval. Sunil Gulati, the president of the US Soccer Federation, said the USSF would be guided by FIFA about approving any matches.

== Aftermath ==
Since 2013, Relevent Sports has run the International Champions Cup, a series of summer matches between teams from the Premier League and other top European sides, held in overseas markets including Asia and North America. In August 2018, Relevent announced a partnership with La Liga under which a regular-season fixture would be staged in the United States. The proposal was compared to Game 39 in The Guardian by Ed Aarons, who speculated both that opposition from Spanish fans might stop Relevant's plan, and that Relevent might seek a similar arrangement with the Premier League. The Royal Spanish Football Federation has held its Supercopa abroad since 2018, but prevents La Liga matches taking place outside Spain. In 2019, US Soccer refused to sanction foreign league fixtures on U.S. territory, in line with a 2018 FIFA policy. Relevent sued under the Sherman Antitrust Act and in 2024 FIFA agreed to consider changing its policy. La Liga once again planned to hold a league match in the United States in December 2025, between FC Barcelona (who originally planned to headline the initial first United States game) and Villarreal, once again in partnership with Relevent. Additionally, Serie A planned to stage a match in Perth, Australia in February 2026 between AC Milan and Como 1907, partly owing to Milan hosting the 2026 Winter Olympics. Both matches were approved by UEFA under extraordinary circumstances, but both were later cancelled, LaLiga owing their cancellation due to team and fan protests, while Serie A's Perth match was cancelled due to last-minute demands imposed by the Asian Football Confederation (AFC).

In September 2021, the Premier League told Sky Sports "there are no plans to extend the Premier League season to 39 games and play matches abroad", but there were initial proposals to "make pre-season matches more competitive, whilst also potentially opening up lucrative new international markets". In 2023 Phil Murphy, the governor of New Jersey and a 2026 World Cup executive, said he "would love to think" Premier League matches would be played in his state but "the clubs have not been wild about" the idea. Premier League CEO Richard Masters said after an April 2024 meeting of European Leagues, "The door looks ajar potentially in America anyway but it’s not one of our current plans, it really isn’t." In response the Football Supporters' Association (FSA, successor to the FSF) promised to oppose any such move.

In October 2024, the Labour government introduced a bill to establish an Independent Football Regulator for England and Wales. In May 2025, The Guardian reported plans to amend the bill to strengthen the regulator's power to prohibit domestic matches being held overseas.

In October 2025, it was reported that Australia's National Rugby League (NRL), the top division of rugby league in the country, were exploring the possibility of having the opening round of the 2027 season held entirely in markets outside of Australia and New Zealand, following their successful Las Vegas opening round matches held since 2023. In addition to Las Vegas, cities such as Toulouse, London, Dubai and Honolulu were floated to host matches for this "global round". While comparisons have been made between it and the proposed Rugby 360 (R360) breakaway rugby union competition, the NRL proposal is more similar to Game 39.
