= Goal of the century =

Goal of the century may refer to:

- FIFA World Cup Goal of the Century (20th century), a football goal scored by Diego Maradona at the 1986 FIFA World Cup in Mexico for Argentina against England
- Sportschau Goal of the Century, a football award given by Sportschau, a German TV sports magazine programme
- Wembley Goal of the Century (20th c.), at the 1981 FA Cup Final
- Irish National Football League Goal of the Century (20th c.), in the 1956–57 National Football League (Ireland)
- Ice hockey Goal of the Century (20th c.) Goal scored by Paul Henderson to give Canada the win in the Summit Series, the first ever Canada versus the Soviet Union challenge series.
- "Goal of the Century" (song) by Gang of Youths, 2022

== See also ==
- Goal of the Decade
- Goal of the Year (disambiguation)
- Goal of the Season (disambiguation)
- Goal of the Month (disambiguation)
- Game of the Century (disambiguation)
- Player of the century
- Team of the century
- Century (disambiguation)
- Goal (disambiguation)
