= List of association football media =

This is a list notable channels, programmes and publications, which focus on association football.

FourFourTwo
a popular English-language football magazine with a number of international editions and named after the 4–4–2 formation.
France Football
French bi-weekly magazine established in 1946 containing football news from all over the world and one of the most reputable European sports publications. Awards the annual Ballon d'Or award for European Footballer of the Year.
Kicker
Germany's leading football magazine founded in 1920 and published twice a week.
Match of the Day
an English-language television programme broadcast on the BBC since the 1960s. It originally showed the highlights from just one game from the top division each week, but nowadays it features highlights of all Saturday and midweek Premier League games.
On the Ball
an English-language television programme broadcast on ITV. It ran intermittently from the 1980s until being discontinued in 2004.
When Saturday Comes
an English monthly fanzine-style football magazine first published in 1986.
World Soccer (magazine)
a monthly English language football magazine produced by IPC Media since 1950, offering a broad perspective on football news and events worldwide.
World Soccer Talk
a media company for U.S. viewers delivering comprehensive world soccer TV & streaming schedules combined with soccer news.
