= Andy Harrison =

British businessman and management consultant

- Born: 2 May 1957 (age 69)
- Education: University of Cambridge
- Occupations: Businessman; Former management consultant
- Title: CEO of The RAC (1996–2005); CEO of easyJet (2005–2010); CEO of Whitbread (2010–2015); Chairman of Dunelm Group (2015–2022); Chairman of SEGRO (2022–present)

Andrew Harrison (born 2 May 1957) is a British businessman and former management consultant, and the chairman of SEGRO. He has been the CEO of The RAC, easyJet, Whitbread and the Dunelm Group.

== Early life ==
Harrison was educated at Hitchin Boys' Grammar School and Bristol Grammar School, an independent day school. He went on to study economics at Pembroke College, Cambridge.

== Career ==
Prior to joining the RAC, Harrison held the roles of managing director of Courtaulds International Fabrics and finance director of Courtaulds Textiles plc. He was also a non-executive director at EMAP.

He was the chief executive of the automotive services company the RAC (previously Lex Services plc) from 1996 to 2005.

Harrison was announced as Ray Webster's successor as CEO of easyJet in September 2005. Harrison announced his intention to leave easyJet in December 2009 and departed in 2010 as Sir Stelios Haji-Ioannou, the airline's founder, described him as "overrated". EasyJet said "Andy did a very good job executing the strategy set by the board and will deliver substantial profit growth in 2010 through the worst recesssion in 70 years".

Harrison became CEO of the British multinational hotel, coffee shop and restaurant company Whitbread in 2010, replacing Alan Parker. Harrison left in 2015, succeeded by Alison Brittain.

Harrison became chairman of Dunelm Group in July 2015.

Harrison succeeded Gerald Corbett as the chairman of SEGRO in 2022.

Business positions
Preceded by Ray Webster	CEO of EasyJet; 2005–2010	Succeeded by Carolyn McCall
Preceded by Alan Parker	CEO of Whitbread; 2010–2015	Succeeded by Alison Brittain
