= Premier League =

English association football league

- Founded: 20 February 1992; 34 years ago
- Country: England (Note: Between 2011 and 2019, at various intervals, the league featured two clubs from Wales, Cardiff City and Swansea City, who both play in the English football league system.)
- Confederation: UEFA
- Chairwoman: Alison Brittain
- Chief Executive Officer: Richard Masters
- Number of clubs: 20 (since 1995–96) (Note: 22 teams between 1992–1995.)
- Level on pyramid: 1
- Relegation to: EFL Championship
- Domestic cups: FA Cup; FA Community Shield
- League cup: EFL Cup
- International cups: UEFA Champions League; UEFA Europa League; UEFA Conference League
- Current champions: Arsenal (4th title) (2025–26)
- Most championships: Manchester United (13 titles)
- Most appearances: James Milner (658)
- Top scorer: Alan Shearer (260)
- Broadcasters: Sky Sports; TNT Sports / Discovery+; BBC Sport (highlights); International: Broadcasters
- Website: premierleague.com
- Current: 2026–27 Premier League

The Premier League (Note: Also known as the English Premier League (EPL) outside England or colloquially as the Prem.) is a professional association football league in England and the highest level of the English football league system. Contested by 20 clubs, it operates on a system of promotion and relegation with the English Football League (EFL). Seasons usually run from August to May, with each team playing 38 matches: two against each other team, one home and one away. Most games are played on weekend afternoons, with occasional weekday evening fixtures.

The competition was founded as the FA Premier League (Note: FA for The Football Association) on 20 February 1992, after First Division (the top tier since 1888) clubs broke away from the English Football League. The league is a corporation governed by its member clubs and managed by a chief executive. The Premier League has a £6.7 billion domestic television rights deal, with Sky and TNT Sports showing at least 215 and 52 games, respectively. In the 2022–2025 cycle, the Premier League's international broadcast rights were worth £5.3 billion, surpassing £5.1 billion domestic rights for the first time. As of 2023–24, clubs received £2.8 billion in central payments, with additional solidarity payments made to relegated clubs.

The Premier League is the world's most-watched sports league, broadcast in 212 territories to a potential audience of 4.7 billion people. More than 1.4 billion watched live games during the 2024–25 season. The league has the highest average match attendance in association football, at 40,421 per game, with most stadiums near full capacity. The Premier League is ranked first in the UEFA coefficient rankings based on performances in European competitions over the past five seasons. English clubs have won the second-highest number of European Cup / UEFA Champions League titles, with a record six clubs winning fifteen European cups in total.

Fifty-one clubs have competed in the Premier League since its inception in 1992: 49 from England and two from Wales. Seven have won the title: Manchester United (13), Manchester City (8), Chelsea (5), Arsenal (4), Liverpool (2), Blackburn Rovers and Leicester City (1 each). Only six clubs have played in every season to date: Arsenal, Chelsea, Everton, Liverpool, Manchester United, and Tottenham Hotspur.

== History ==
=== Origins ===
Despite major European success in the 1970s and early 1980s, the mid-to-late 1980s marked a low point for English football. Stadiums were ageing with poor facilities, hooliganism was rife, and all English clubs faced a 5-year ban from European competition following the events of the 1985 Heysel Stadium disaster, with Liverpool facing an extra year. The Football League First Division, the top level of English football since 1888, was behind leagues such as Italy's Serie A and Spain's La Liga in attendance and revenues, and several top English players had moved abroad.

By the turn of the 1990s, the downward trend was starting to reverse. At the 1990 FIFA World Cup, England reached the semi-finals; UEFA, European football's governing body, lifted the five-year ban on English clubs playing in European competitions in 1990, resulting in Manchester United lifting the Cup Winners' Cup in 1991. The Taylor Report on stadium safety standards, which proposed expensive upgrades to create all-seater stadiums in the aftermath of the Hillsborough disaster (between the fans of Liverpool and the fans of Nottingham Forest at Hillsborough Stadium, Sheffield, Yorkshire on 15 April 1989) was published in January 1990.

During the 1980s, major English clubs began transforming into business ventures, applying commercial principles to club administration to maximise revenue. Martin Edwards of Manchester United, Irving Scholar of Tottenham Hotspur, and David Dein of Arsenal were among the key figures in this shift. The drive for greater revenue and influence led First Division clubs to threaten a breakaway from the Football League. They also began demanding higher fees from broadcasters. As a result, they secured increased voting power and a 50% share of all television and sponsorship income in 1986. Before 1986, clubs received only around £25,000 per year from television rights, and this rose to £600,000 by 1988. The Football League had secured £6.3 million for a two-year deal in 1986, followed by a £44 million deal over four years in 1988 with ITV, with top clubs taking 75% of the income.

Negotiations took place in 1988 under the threat of ten clubs forming a "super league". They were persuaded to stay, but with leading clubs securing the bulk of the deal. The talks also revealed that the bigger clubs would need the entire First Division to gain enough support for a future breakaway. By the early 1990s, such a move was again being considered, especially as clubs faced the financial burden of stadium upgrades recommended by the Taylor Report.

In 1990, the managing director of London Weekend Television (LWT), Greg Dyke, met the representatives of the "Big Five" football clubs in England (Manchester United, Liverpool, Tottenham Hotspur, Everton, and Arsenal) over a dinner. The meeting was to pave the way for a breakaway from the Football League. Dyke believed that it would be more lucrative for LWT if only the larger clubs in the country were featured on national television and wanted to establish whether the clubs would be interested in a larger share of television rights money. The five clubs agreed with the suggestion and decided to press ahead with it; however, the league would have no credibility without the backing of the Football Association, and so David Dein of Arsenal held talks to see whether the FA were receptive to the idea. The FA did not have an amicable relationship with the Football League at the time and considered it a way to weaken the Football League's position. The FA released a report in June 1991, Blueprint for the Future of Football, that supported the plan for the Premier League, with the FA as the ultimate authority that would oversee the breakaway league.

=== Founding and Manchester United dominance (1990s) ===
Foundation, 1990s and early Manchester United dominance
Season	Champions	Runners-up
1992–93	Manchester United	Aston Villa
1993–94	Manchester United	Blackburn Rovers
1994–95	Blackburn Rovers	Manchester United
1995–96	Manchester United	Newcastle United
1996–97	Manchester United	Newcastle United
1997–98	Arsenal	Manchester United
1998–99	Manchester United	Arsenal
Double winners Treble winners

At the close of the 1990–91 season, a proposal was tabled for the establishment of a new league that would bring more money into the game overall. The Founder Members Agreement, signed on 17 July 1991, by the game's top-flight clubs, established the basic principles for setting up the FA Premier League.

The newly formed top division was to have commercial independence from the Football Association and the Football League, giving the FA Premier League licence to negotiate its own broadcast and sponsorship agreements. The argument given was that the extra income would allow English clubs to compete with teams across Europe. This restructuring marked the end of the 104-year-old Football League system that had operated until then with four divisions; the Premier League would run as a single division, with the Football League continuing with three.

Although Dyke played a significant role in the creation of the Premier League, he and ITV (of which LWT was part) lost out in the bidding for broadcast rights: BSkyB won with a bid of £304 million over five years, with the BBC awarded the highlights package broadcast on Match of the Day.

Luton Town, Notts County, and West Ham United were the three teams relegated from the old First Division at the end of the 1991–92 season, and did not take part in the inaugural Premier League season. They were replaced by Ipswich Town, Middlesbrough, and Blackburn Rovers, promoted from the old Second Division. On 27 May 1992, the 22 First Division clubs resigned en masse from the Football League, and the FA Premier League was formed as a limited company, working out of an office at the Football Association's then headquarters in Lancaster Gate.

The league held its first season in 1992–93. The 22 inaugural members of the new Premier League were:

- Arsenal
- Aston Villa
- Blackburn Rovers
- Chelsea
- Coventry City
- Crystal Palace
- Everton
- Ipswich Town
- Leeds United
- Liverpool
- Manchester City
- Manchester United
- Middlesbrough
- Norwich City
- Nottingham Forest
- Oldham Athletic
- Queens Park Rangers
- Sheffield United
- Sheffield Wednesday
- Southampton
- Tottenham Hotspur
- Wimbledon

The first Premier League goal was scored by Brian Deane of Sheffield United in a 2–1 win against Manchester United.

Manchester United won the inaugural edition of the new league, ending a twenty-six year wait to be crowned champions of England. Bolstered by this breakthrough, United quickly became the dominant force in the Premier League, winning seven of the first nine titles and securing two League and FA Cup doubles. They were initially led by experienced players such as Bryan Robson, Steve Bruce, Paul Ince, Mark Hughes and Eric Cantona, before evolving into a younger, more dynamic side featuring Roy Keane and the Class of 92, a group of homegrown talents including David Beckham and Paul Scholes.

At the end of the 1994–95 season, four rather than three clubs were relegated, while only two were promoted from the Football League First Division. This allowed the Premier League to reduce its size from 22 to 20 clubs for the start of the 1995–96 season, reducing the number of matches per team from 42 to 38.

Between 1993 and 1997, Blackburn Rovers and Newcastle United came closest to challenging United's early dominance. Blackburn, led by the prolific Alan Shearer, won the 1994–95 FA Premier League. Newcastle topped the table for much of the 1995–96 season, and signed Shearer in the summer of 1996 for a then world-record fee of £15 million. He would go on to become the all-time top scorer, a record he still holds. Arsenal emerged as serious contenders by winning the League and FA Cup double in 1997–98, and from that point they and Manchester United would go on to dominate the league for the next several years.

In the 1998–99 season, Manchester United completed a historic treble by winning the Premier League, FA Cup and UEFA Champions League. In so doing, they became the first English club to win the European Cup since Liverpool in the 1983–84 season, securing the trophy with a dramatic comeback victory over Bayern Munich in the final.

=== Emergence of the "Big Four" (2000s) ===
Results of the 'Big Four' during the 2000s
Season	ARS	CHE	LIV	MUN
1999–2000	2	5	4	1
2000–01	2	6	3	1
2001–02	1	6	2	3
2002–03	2	4	5	1
2003–04	1	2	4	3
2004–05	2	1	5	3
2005–06	4	1	3	2
2006–07	4	2	3	1
2007–08	3	2	4	1
2008–09	4	3	2	1
Top four	10	7	8	10
out of 10
League champions Champions League group stage Champions League third qualifying / play-off round Champions League first qualifying round UEFA Cup / Europa League

The 2000s saw Arsenal, Chelsea, Liverpool, and Manchester United dominate the Premier League, forming the so-called "Big Four". Manchester United won six league titles (1999–2000, 2000–01, 2002–03, 2006–07, 2007–08, 2008–09), Arsenal claimed two (2001–02, 2003–04), while Chelsea rose to prominence with two under José Mourinho (2004–05, 2005–06). Arsenal's unbeaten 2003–04 season earned them the nickname "The Invincibles", the only team to achieve this feat in the Premier League era. Only three other clubs secured a top-four finish during the decade: Leeds United (1999–00, 2000–01), Newcastle United (2001–02, 2002–03), and Everton (2004–05). However, the Big Four consistently dominated the top spots, with three of them finishing in the top four every season from 1999–2000 to 2008–09.

Premier League clubs were also highly competitive in Europe. Between 2005 and 2012, an English side reached seven of eight Champions League finals, with Liverpool (2005), Manchester United (2008), and Chelsea (2012) winning. Arsenal (2006), Liverpool (2007), Chelsea (2008), and Manchester United (2009, 2011) finished as runners-up. Leeds United were the only non-Big Four side to reach the semi-finals, doing so in 2000–01. Three English clubs made the semi-finals in 2006–07, 2007–08, and 2008–09—a feat only matched twice by other leagues.

In the UEFA Cup/Europa League, four Premier League teams reached the final between 2000 and 2010, with only Liverpool lifting the trophy in 2001. Arsenal (2000), Middlesbrough (2006), and Fulham (2010) all fell short.

The decade saw record-breaking points tallies, including Chelsea's 95-point haul in 2004–05 and Manchester United's three consecutive title wins (2006–07 to 2008–09). The rise of billionaire owners, including Roman Abramovich at Chelsea and Sheikh Mansour at Manchester City (2008), began reshaping the league's financial landscape, setting the stage for a more competitive 2010s.

=== Emergence of the "Big Six" (2010s) ===
Results of the 'Big Six' during the 2010s
Season	ARS	CHE	LIV	MCI	MUN	TOT
2009–10	3	1	7	5	2	4
2010–11	4	2	6	3	1	5
2011–12	3	6	8	1	2	4
2012–13	4	3	7	2	1	5
2013–14	4	3	2	1	7	6
2014–15	3	1	6	2	4	5
2015–16	2	10	8	4	5	3
2016–17	5	1	4	3	6	2
2017–18	6	5	4	1	2	3
2018–19	5	3	2	1	6	4
Top four	7	7	4	9	6	6
Top six	10	9	6	10	9	10
out of 10
League champions Champions League group stage Champions League play-off round Europa League

After 2009, Tottenham Hotspur and Manchester City regularly broke into the top four, forming a "Big Six". In 2009–10, Tottenham finished fourth, the first new club to do so since Everton five years earlier.

Despite growing competition, criticism remains over the financial gap between elite clubs and the rest of the league. Manchester City's 2011–12 title win was the first by a club outside the "Big Four" since Blackburn Rovers in 1994–95. That season also saw Chelsea and Liverpool finish outside the top four for the first time since 1994–95.

With only four UEFA Champions League spots available, competition among the "Big Six" intensified. In the five seasons after 2011–12, Manchester United and Liverpool missed the top four three times, and Chelsea finished 10th in 2015–16. Arsenal's 2016–17 fifth-place finish ended their 20-year top-four streak.

Alternative logo since 2016

In 2015–16, Leicester City defied 5000/1 odds to win the league, becoming the first non-"Big Six" champion since Blackburn in 1994–95.

Financially, the "Big Six" hold outsized influence, arguing for a greater revenue share due to their global status and style of play. Critics argue that the league's egalitarian revenue model ensures long-term competitiveness. The 2016–17 Deloitte Football Money League highlighted the revenue gap. The "Big Six" each earned over €350million, with Manchester United leading at €676.3million. Leicester City was closest, with €271.1million, boosted by Champions League participation. West Ham, eighth in revenue (€213.3million), earned just over half of fifth-place Liverpool (€424.2million).

TV broadcast deals accounted for a large portion of club revenues, with the top clubs earning between £150million and nearly £200million in 2016–17. By 2019, all "Big Six" clubs ranked in the world's top ten richest.

=== 2020s ===
Results of the 'Big Six' during the 2020s
Season	ARS	CHE	LIV	MCI	MUN	TOT
2019–20	8	4	1	2	3	6
2020–21	8	4	3	1	2	7
2021–22	5	3	2	1	6	4
2022–23	2	12	5	1	3	8
2023–24	2	6	3	1	8	5
2024–25	2	4	1	3	15	17
2025–26	1	10	5	2	3	17
Top four	4	4	5	7	4	1
Top six	5	5	7	7	5	3
out of 7
League champions Champions League; Europa League; Conference League

From the 2019–20 season, video assistant referees were introduced in the league. That same season, Liverpool claimed their first Premier League title, finishing comfortably ahead of Manchester City and ending a 30-year wait for a top-flight trophy.

Project Big Picture, announced in October 2020 by Manchester United and Liverpool, proposed closer alignment between top Premier League clubs and the English Football League. The proposal drew criticism from Premier League leadership and the UK Department for Culture, Media and Sport.

On 26 April 2021, play paused during a Leicester City v Crystal Palace match to allow Muslim players Wesley Fofana and Cheikhou Kouyaté to break their Ramadan fast. It was the first time a Premier League game was halted for this reason.

The 2022–23 season paused for six weeks between November and December to accommodate the first winter World Cup, returning for the traditional Boxing Day fixtures. That season, players chose to take the knee at select "significant moments", reaffirming their commitment to ending racial prejudice. The campaign also saw Newcastle United and Brighton break into the top six, finishing fourth and sixth respectively, while Tottenham and Chelsea ended up eighth and twelfth. Former champions Leicester City were relegated, becoming only the second Premier League-winning club to go down since Blackburn Rovers in 2011–12.

Manchester City won the Premier League for the sixth time in seven years in the 2023–24 season, becoming the first top-flight side in English football history to win four consecutive league titles.

== Corporate structure ==
The Football Association Premier League Limited (FAPL) is operated as a corporation and is owned by the 20 member clubs. Each club is a shareholder, with one vote each on issues such as rule changes and contracts. The clubs select a chairman, chief executive, and board of directors to oversee the daily operations of the league. The Football Association is not directly involved in the day-to-day operations of the Premier League, but has veto power as a special shareholder during the election of the chairman and chief executive and when new rules are adopted by the league.

The current chief executive is Richard Masters, who was appointed in December 2019. The chair is currently Alison Brittain, who took over the role in early 2023.

The Premier League sends representatives to UEFA's European Club Association, the number of clubs and the clubs themselves chosen according to UEFA coefficients. For the 2023–24 season, the Premier League has 13 representatives in the Association: Arsenal, Aston Villa, Brighton & Hove Albion, Chelsea, Everton, Liverpool, Manchester City, Manchester United, Newcastle United, Nottingham Forest, Tottenham Hotspur, West Ham United, and Wolverhampton Wanderers. The European Club Association is responsible for electing three members to UEFA's Club Competitions Committee, which is involved in the operations of UEFA competitions such as the Champions League and UEFA Europa League.

Office holders
Office	No.	Name	Tenure
Chief Executive	1	Rick Parry	1991–1997
Chief Executive	2	Richard Scudamore	1999–2018
Chief Executive	3	Richard Masters	2019–
Chair	1	Sir John Quinton	1991–1999
Chair	2	Dave Richards	1999–2013
Chair	3	Anthony Fry	2013–2014
Chair	4	Richard Scudamore	2014–2018
Chair	5	Gary Hoffman	2020–2022
Chair	6	Alison Brittain	2023–

=== Criticism of governance ===
The Premier League has faced criticism of its governance due to an alleged lack of transparency and accountability.

Following the Premier League's blocking of the attempted takeover of Newcastle United by a PIF-backed consortium through the league's Owners' and Directors' test, many MPs, Newcastle United fans and related parties to the deal denounced the Premier League for its perceived lack of transparency and accountability throughout the process. On 6 July 2021, consortium member Amanda Staveley of PCP Capital Partners said that "fans surely deserve absolute transparency from the regulators across all their processes – to best ensure that they act responsibly. They (the Premier League) are performing a function like that of a government regulator – but without the same systems for accountability."

On 22 July 2021, Tracey Crouch MP – chair of the fan-led review into the UK's football governance – announced in the review's interim findings that the Premier League had "lost the trust and confidence" of fans. The review also recommended that a new independent regulator be created to oversee matters such as club takeovers.

Premier League chief executive Richard Masters had earlier spoken out against the implementation of an independent regulator, saying in May 2021, "I don't think that the independent regulator is the answer to the question. I would defend the Premier League's role as regulator of its clubs over the past 30 years."

== Competition format ==
[The Premier League] is very tough and is different. If you compare this league to another league, it's like playing another sport.

— Antonio Conte, on the competitiveness of the Premier League.

In [The Premier League] you never really know what is going to happen, there is very little between the teams.

— Luis_Suárez_

=== Competition ===
There are 20 clubs in the Premier League. During the course of a season (from August to May) each club plays the others twice (a double round-robin system), once at their home stadium and once at that of their opponents, for 38 games. Teams receive three points for a win and one point for a draw. No points are awarded for a loss. Teams are ranked by total points, then goal difference, and then goals scored. If still equal, teams are deemed to occupy the same position. If there is a tie for the championship, for relegation, or for qualification to other competitions, the head-to-head record between the tied teams is taken into consideration (points scored in the matches between the teams, followed by away goals in those matches.) If two teams are still tied, a play-off match at a neutral venue decides rank.

=== Promotion and relegation ===
A system of promotion and relegation exists between the Premier League and the EFL Championship. The three lowest placed teams in the Premier League are relegated to the Championship, and the top two teams from the Championship promoted to the Premier League, with an additional team promoted after a series of play-offs involving the third, fourth, fifth and sixth placed clubs. The number of clubs was reduced from 22 to 20 in 1995, when four teams were relegated from the league and only two teams promoted. The top flight had only been expanded to 22 teams at the start of the 1991–92 season – the year prior to the formation of the Premier League.

On 8 June 2006, FIFA requested that all major European leagues, including Italy's Serie A and Spain's La Liga, be reduced to 18 teams by the start of the 2007–08 season. The Premier League responded by announcing their intention to resist such a reduction. Ultimately, the 2007–08 season kicked off again with 20 teams.

=== Video Assistant Referee ===
Video assistant referee (VAR), was introduced to the Premier League at the beginning of the 2019–20 season. It uses technology and officials to assist the referee in making decisions on the pitch. However, its use has been met with mixed receptions from fans and pundits, with some praising its accuracy whilst others criticise its impact on the flow of the game and consistency of decision-making.

The on-field referee still makes the final decision, but VAR can assist the referee in the decision-making process. VAR can only be used for four types of decisions: goals, penalty decisions, direct red card incidents, and cases of mistaken identity. VAR officials review the video footage and communicate with the on-field referee via a headset. The VAR officials are located in a central control room, which is equipped with multiple camera angles and the ability to replay footage at various speeds.

A study evaluating fan reception of VAR in the Premier League was made by Otto Kolbinger and Melanie Knopp and was done by analysing Twitter data. The researchers used sentiment analysis to measure the overall positive or negative attitudes towards VAR, as well as topic modelling to identify specific issues that fans are discussing related to VAR. The study found that the reception of VAR on Twitter is largely negative, with fans expressing frustration and criticism of the technology's impact on the flow of the game and the inconsistency of decisions. The researchers also identified specific issues, such as handball and offside decisions, that fans are particularly critical of. The study concludes that VAR has not been well received by fans in the Premier League, and that efforts to improve the technology and increase transparency in decision-making are needed to address these concerns.

== Clubs ==
Fifty-one clubs have played in the Premier League from its inception in 1992, up to and including the 2026–27 season.

=== Champions ===
Club	Winners	Runners-up	Winning seasons
Manchester United	13	7	1992–93, 1993–94, 1995–96, 1996–97, 1998–99, 1999–2000, 2000–01, 2002–03, 2006–07, 2007–08, 2008–09, 2010–11, 2012–13
Manchester City	8	4	2011–12, 2013–14, 2017–18, 2018–19, 2020–21, 2021–22, 2022–23, 2023–24
Chelsea	5	4	2004–05, 2005–06, 2009–10, 2014–15, 2016–17
Arsenal	4	9	1997–98, 2001–02, 2003–04, 2025–26
Liverpool	2	5	2019–20, 2024–25
Blackburn Rovers	1	1	1994–95
Leicester City	1	0	2015–16

Italics indicate former Premier League champions that are currently outside the Premier League.

=== 2026–27 season ===
Twenty clubs will compete in the 2026–27 season – the top seventeen from the previous season and the three promoted from the EFL Championship.

2026–27 Club	2025–26 Position	First season in top division	First season in Premier League	Seasons in top division	Seasons in Premier League	First season of current spell in top division	No. of seasons of current spell in Premier League	Top division titles	Most recent top division title
Arsenal (Note: Founding member of the Premier League) (Note: Never been relegated from the Premier League)	1st	1904–05	1992–93	110	35	1919–20 (101 seasons (Note: No League football was played between 1940–41 and 1945–46 due to World War II.))	35	14	2025–26
Aston Villa (Note: One of the original twelve Football League teams)	4th	1888–89	1992–93	113	32	2019–20 (8 seasons)	8	7	1980–81
Bournemouth	6th	2015–16	2015–16	10	10	2022–23 (5 seasons)	5	0	–
Brentford	9th	1935–36	2021–22	11	6	2021–22 (6 seasons)	6	0	–
Brighton & Hove Albion	8th	1979–80	2017–18	14	10	2017–18 (10 seasons)	10	0	–
Chelsea	10th	1907–08	1992–93	92	35	1989–90 (38 seasons)	35	6	2016–17
Coventry City	1st (EFL)	1967–68	1992–93	35	10	2026–27 (1 season)	1	0	–
Crystal Palace	15th	1969–70	1992–93	27	18	2013–14 (14 seasons)	14	0	–
Everton	13th	1888–89	1992–93	124	35	1954–55 (73 seasons)	35	9	1986–87
Fulham	11th	1949–50	2001–02	32	20	2022–23 (5 seasons)	5	0	–
Hull City	6th playoffs (EFL)	2008–09	2008–09	6	6	2026–27 (1 season)	1	0	–
Ipswich Town	2nd (EFL)	1961–62	1992–93	28	7	2026–27 (1 season)	1	1	1961–62
Leeds United	14th	1924–25	1992–93	55	17	2025–26 (2 seasons)	2	3	1991–92
Liverpool	5th	1894–95	1992–93	112	35	1962–63 (65 seasons)	35	20	2024–25
Manchester City	2nd	1899–1900	1992–93	98	30	2002–03 (25 seasons)	25	10	2023–24
Manchester United	3rd	1892–93	1992–93	102	35	1975–76 (52 seasons)	35	20	2012–13
Newcastle United	12th	1898–99	1993–94	95	32	2017–18 (10 seasons)	10	4	1926–27
Nottingham Forest	16th	1892–93	1992–93	61	10	2022–23 (5 seasons)	5	1	1977–78
Sunderland	7th	1890–91	1996–97	88	18	2025–26 (2 seasons)	2	6	1935–36
Tottenham Hotspur	17th	1909–10	1992–93	92	35	1978–79 (49 seasons)	35	2	1960–61

- West Ham United, Burnley and Wolverhampton Wanderers were relegated to the EFL Championship for the 2026–27 season, whilst Coventry City, Ipswich Town and Hull City, as winners, runners-up and play-off final winners, respectively, were promoted from the 2025–26 season.
- Only two clubs have remained in the Premier League since their first promotion: Brentford and Brighton & Hove Albion, who have been in 6 and 10 season(s) (out of 35), respectively.
Locations of the 2026–27 Premier League clubs
Location of clubs around Greater London for the 2026–27 Premier League

=== Non-English clubs ===
In 2011, after Swansea City gained promotion, a Welsh club participated in the Premier League for the first time. The first Premier League match to be played outside England was Swansea City's home match at Liberty Stadium against Wigan Athletic on 20 August 2011. The number of Welsh clubs in the Premier League increased to two in 2013–14, as Cardiff City gained promotion, but they were relegated after their maiden season. Cardiff were promoted again in 2017–18 but the number of Welsh clubs remained the same for the 2018–19 Premier League season, as Swansea City had been relegated from the Premier League in 2017–18. Following Cardiff City's relegation after the 2018–19 season, there are currently no Welsh clubs participating in the Premier League.

Because they are members of the Football Association of Wales (FAW), the question of whether clubs like Swansea should represent England or Wales in European competitions has caused long-running discussions in UEFA. Swansea took one of England's three available places in the Europa League in 2013–14 by winning the League Cup in 2012–13. The right of Welsh clubs to take up such English places was in doubt until UEFA clarified the matter in March 2012, allowing them to participate.

Participation in the Premier League by some Scottish or Irish clubs has sometimes been discussed, but without result. The idea came closest to reality in 1998, when Wimbledon received Premier League approval to relocate to Dublin, Ireland, but the move was blocked by the Football Association of Ireland. Additionally, the English media occasionally discusses the idea that Scotland's two biggest teams, Celtic and Rangers, should or will take part in the Premier League, but nothing has come of these discussions.

Three other Welsh clubs - Merthyr Town, Newport County and Wrexham - play in the English football league system, and can be eligible for promotion into the Premier League.

=== Seasons in English top flight ===
There are 65 teams that have taken part in 128 English top flight championships (both the Football League First Division and the Premier League) that were played from the 1888–89 season until the 2026–27 season. The teams in bold compete in the Premier League currently, while the teams in italics have never competed in the Premier League. The year in parentheses represents the most recent year of participation at this level. No team has played top flight football in every season; the closest being Everton, who have played in 124 of the 128 seasons.

- **124** seasons: **Everton** (2027)
- **113** seasons: **Aston Villa** (2027)
- **112** seasons: **Liverpool** (2027)
- **110** seasons: **Arsenal** (2027)
- **102** seasons: **Manchester United** (2027)
- **98** seasons: **Manchester City** (2027)
- **95** seasons: **Newcastle United** (2027)
- **92** seasons: **Chelsea** (2027), **Tottenham Hotspur** (2027)
- **88** seasons: **Sunderland** (2027)
- **81** seasons: West Bromwich Albion (2021)
- **73** seasons: Bolton Wanderers (2012)
- **72** seasons: Blackburn Rovers (2012)
- **71** seasons: Wolverhampton Wanderers (2026)
- **68** seasons: West Ham United (2026)
- **66** seasons: Sheffield Wednesday (2000)
- **65** seasons: Derby County (2008)
- **63** seasons: Sheffield United (2024)
- **62** seasons: Stoke City (2018)
- **61** seasons: Middlesbrough (2017), Burnley (2026), **Nottingham Forest** (2027)
- **57** seasons: Birmingham City (2011)
- **56** seasons: Leicester City (2025)
- **55** seasons: **Leeds United** (2027)
- **47** seasons: Southampton (2025)
- **46** seasons: Preston North End (1961)
- **35** seasons: **Coventry City** (2027)
- **33** seasons: Portsmouth (2010)
- **32** seasons: Huddersfield Town (2019), **Fulham** (2027)
- **30** seasons: Notts County (1992)
- **28** seasons: Blackpool (2011), **Ipswich Town** (2027)
- **27** seasons: Norwich City (2022), **Crystal Palace** (2027)
- **26** seasons: Charlton Athletic (2007)
- **23** seasons: Queens Park Rangers (2015)
- **22** seasons: Bury (1929)
- **17** seasons: Cardiff City (2019), Luton Town (2024)
- **14** seasons: Wimbledon (2000), Watford (2022), **Brighton & Hove Albion** (2027)
- **12** seasons: Grimsby Town (1948), Oldham Athletic (1994), Bradford City (2001)
- **11** seasons: **Brentford** (2027)
- **10** seasons: **Bournemouth** (2027)
- **9** seasons: Bristol City (1980), Swansea City (2018)
- **8** seasons: Wigan Athletic (2013)
- **6** seasons: **Hull City** (2027)
- **5** seasons: Accrington (1893)
- **3** seasons: Bradford (Park Avenue) (1921), Oxford United (1988), Reading (2013)
- **2** seasons: Darwen (1894), Millwall (1990)
- **1** season: Glossop North End (1900), Leyton Orient (1963), Northampton Town (1966), Carlisle United (1975), Swindon Town (1994), Barnsley (1998)

=== Seasons in Premier League ===
There are 51 teams that have taken part in 35 Premier League championships that were played from the 1992–93 season until the 2026–27 season. The teams in bold compete in the Premier League currently. The year in parentheses represents the most recent year of participation at this level. Six teams have competed in every Premier League season, those being Arsenal, Chelsea, Everton, Liverpool, Manchester United, and Tottenham Hotspur.

- **35** seasons: **Arsenal** (2027), **Chelsea** (2027), **Everton** (2027), **Liverpool** (2027), **Manchester United** (2027), **Tottenham Hotspur** (2027)
- **32** seasons: **Aston Villa** (2027), **Newcastle United** (2027)
- **30** seasons: West Ham United (2026), **Manchester City** (2027)
- **25** seasons: Southampton (2025)
- **20** seasons: **Fulham** (2027)
- **18** seasons: Blackburn Rovers (2012), Leicester City (2025), **Crystal Palace** (2027), **Sunderland** (2027)
- **17** seasons: **Leeds United** (2027)
- **15** seasons: Middlesbrough (2017)
- **13** seasons: Bolton Wanderers (2012), West Bromwich Albion (2021)
- **12** seasons: Wolverhampton Wanderers (2026)
- **10** seasons: Stoke City (2018), Norwich City (2022), Burnley (2026), **Bournemouth** (2027), **Brighton & Hove Albion** (2027), **Coventry City** (2027), **Nottingham Forest** (2027)
- **8** seasons: Sheffield Wednesday (2000), Wimbledon (2000), Charlton Athletic (2007), Wigan Athletic (2013), Watford (2022)
- **7** seasons: Derby County (2008), Portsmouth (2010), Birmingham City (2011), Queens Park Rangers (2015), Swansea City (2018), **Ipswich Town** (2027)
- **6** seasons: Sheffield United (2024), **Brentford** (2027), **Hull City** (2027)
- **3** seasons: Reading (2013)
- **2** seasons: Oldham Athletic (1994), Bradford City (2001), Cardiff City (2019), Huddersfield Town (2019)
- **1** season: Swindon Town (1994), Barnsley (1998), Blackpool (2011), Luton Town (2024)

== International competitions ==
=== Qualification for European competitions ===
==== Qualification criteria for 2025–26 ====
The top four teams in the Premier League qualify automatically for the subsequent season's UEFA Champions League league phase. The champions of the Champions League and UEFA Europa League may earn an additional qualification for the subsequent season's Champions League league phase if did not finish in the top four. There are additional berths for the two best associations in the previous season's rankings, which may result in a maximum of seven teams from one association in the Champions League.

The fifth-placed team in the Premier League, as well as the winners of the FA Cup, qualify for the subsequent season's Europa League league phase, but if the winner of the FA Cup also finishes in the top five places in the Premier League or has won one of UEFA's major tournaments, then this place reverts to the team that finished sixth. The winner of the EFL Cup qualifies for the subsequent season's UEFA Conference League, but if the winner had already qualified for a UEFA competition via their performance in another competition, then this place reverts to the team that finished sixth in the Premier League, or seventh if the FA Cup result had already caused the sixth-placed team to qualify.

The number of places allocated to English clubs in UEFA competitions is dependent upon the position the country holds in the UEFA coefficient rankings, which are calculated based on the performance of teams in UEFA competitions over the previous five years. Currently, England is ranked first, ahead of Spain.

As of 1 June 2025, the coefficients are as follows (only top five European leagues are shown):

Ranking			Member association (L: League, C: Cup, LC: League Cup)	Coefficient						Teams (Note: Number of teams still active from association in UEFA Champions League, UEFA Europa League or UEFA Conference League.)	Regular places in 2026–27 season (Note: European Performance Spots: The two associations with the highest one-year coefficient in the most recent season are awarded an additional berth in the Champions League league phase.)			
2025	2024	Mvmt	Member association (L: League, C: Cup, LC: League Cup)	2020–21	2021–22	2022–23	2023–24	2024–25	Total	Teams	CL	EL	ECL	Total
1	1	–	England (L, C, LC (Note: The champion of the league cup of England is given a place in the UEFA Conference League by special permission from UEFA (replacing the lowest-ranked league team which would have qualified).))	24.357	21.000	23.000	17.375	29.464	115.196	4/9	4	2	1	7
2	2	–	Italy (L, C)	16.285	15.714	22.357	21.000	21.875	97.231	0/7	4	2	1	7
3	3	–	Spain (L, C)	19.500	18.428	16.571	16.062	23.892	94.453	2/8	4	2	1	7
4	4	–	Germany (L, C)	15.214	16.214	17.125	19.357	18.421	86.331	2/7	4	2	1	7
5	5	–	France (L, C)	7.916	18.416	12.583	16.250	17.928	73.093	2/7	4	2	1	7

==== Previous seasons ====
An exception to the usual European qualification system happened in 2005, after Liverpool won the Champions League the season before, but did not finish in a Champions League qualification place in the Premier League after the English FA decided that only the top four from the Premier League would qualify for the Champions League (or in the case of third and fourth place, the Champions League qualifying round) three weeks before the final. Despite the precedent that the winners defend their trophy, Liverpool's participation in the following year's Champions League was still in doubt, and the competition's governing body UEFA initially maintained that each country could only have four spots and suggested that the FA could nominate Liverpool instead of Everton. UEFA chief executive Lars-Christer Olsson said there was never any discussion of whether Liverpool should enter the competition as it was unanimous as holders they should, thus England were given five qualifiers for the following season. To avoid the situation arising again UEFA subsequently ruled that the defending champions automatically qualify for the competition the following year regardless of their domestic league placing. For those leagues with four entrants in the Champions League, this meant that if the Champions League winners finished outside the top four in its domestic league, it would qualify at the expense of the fourth-placed team. At that time, no association could have more than four entrants in the Champions League. This occurred in 2012, when Chelsea – who had won the Champions League that summer, but finished sixth in the league – qualified for the 2012–13 Champions League in place of Tottenham Hotspur, who went into the Europa League.

From 2015–16, the Europa League champions qualify for the Champions League, increasing the maximum number of participants per country to five. This took effect in England in 2016–17, when Manchester United finished sixth in the Premier League and won the Europa League, giving England five Champions League entrants for 2017–18.

English clubs won the UEFA Champions League twice between 2020 and 2024. Chelsea defeated Manchester City in the 2021 final, while Manchester City beat Inter Milan in 2023. During this same five-year period, Real Madrid also won the competition twice, defeating Liverpool in 2022 and Borussia Dortmund in 2024. English teams appeared in four of the ten final spots across these five tournaments, with Chelsea, Manchester City (twice), and Liverpool all reaching the final.

=== Performance in international competition ===
With 52 UEFA club competition trophies won, English clubs are the second-most successful in European football, behind only Spain (67). In the top-tier UEFA Champions League, a record six English clubs have won a total of 15 titles and lost a further 12 finals, behind Spanish clubs with 20 and 11, respectively. In the second-tier UEFA Europa League, English clubs are second, with eleven victories and nine losses in the finals. In the former second-tier UEFA Cup Winners' Cup, English teams won a record eight titles and had a further five finalists. In the non-UEFA organised Inter-Cities Fairs Cup, English clubs provided four winners and four runners-up, the second-most behind Spain with six and three, respectively. In the newly created third-tier UEFA Conference League, English clubs have a record three titles so far. In the former fourth-tier UEFA Intertoto Cup, England won four titles and had a further final appearance, placing it fifth in the rankings, although English clubs were notorious for treating the tournament with disdain, either sending "B" squads or withdrawing from it altogether. In the one-off UEFA Super Cup, England has ten winners and twelve runners-up, the second-most behind Spain with 17 and 15, respectively. Similarly to the Intertoto Cup, English teams did not take the former Intercontinental Cup seriously enough, despite its international status of the Club World Championship. They a made a total of six appearances in the one-off competition, winning only one of them, and withdrew a further three times. English clubs have won the FIFA-organised Club World Cup five times, the second-most behind only Spain, with eight.

== Sponsorship ==
After an inaugural season with no sponsorship, the Premier League was sponsored by Carling from 1993 until 2001, during which time it was known as the FA Carling Premiership. In 2001, a new sponsorship deal with Barclaycard saw the league rebranded the FA Barclaycard Premiership, which was changed to the FA Barclays Premiership in time for the 2004–05 season.

For the 2007–08 season, the league was rebranded the Barclays Premier League.

Period	Sponsor	Brand
1992–1993	No sponsor	FA Premier League
1993–2001	Carling	FA Carling Premiership
2001–2004	Barclaycard	FA Barclaycard Premiership
2004–2007	Barclays	FA Barclays Premiership
2007–2016	Barclays	Barclays Premier League
2016–present	No sponsor	Premier League

Barclays' deal with the Premier League expired at the end of the 2015–16 season. The organisation announced on 4 June 2015 that it would not pursue any further title sponsorship deals for the Premier League, arguing that they wanted to build a "clean" brand for the competition more in line with those of major U.S. sports leagues.

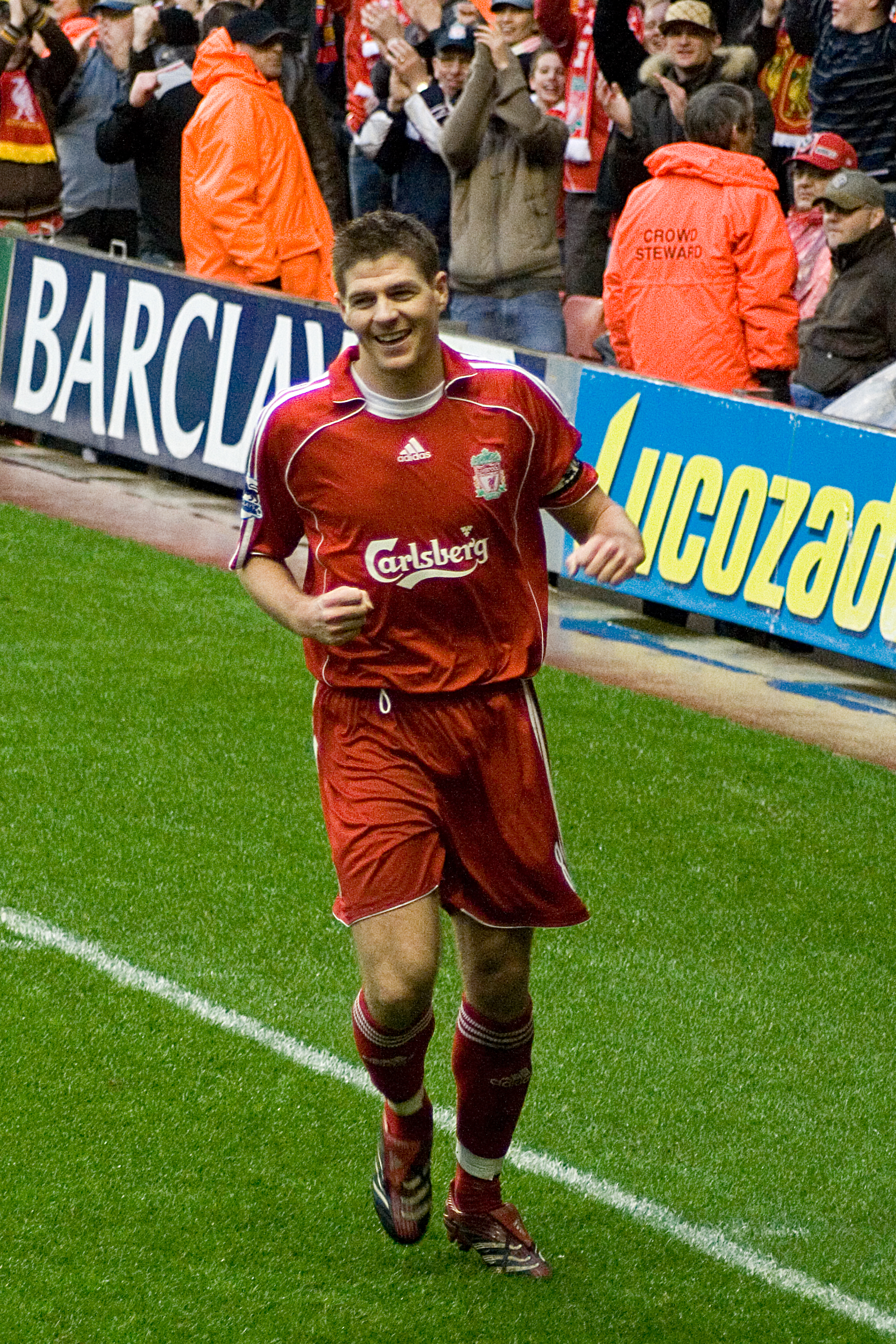
Brands such as Barclays bank and the sports drink Lucozade (pictured on advertising hoarding in 2007) have been official partners of the Premier League

As well as sponsorship for the league itself, the Premier League has a number of official partners and suppliers. The official ball supplier for the league is Puma who have had the contract since the 2025–26 season when they took over from Nike. Topps held the licence to produce collectables for the Premier League between 1994 and 2019 including stickers (for their sticker album) and trading cards. Launched in the 2007–08 season, Topps' Match Attax, the official Premier League trading card game, is the best selling boys collectable in the UK, and is also the biggest selling sports trading card game in the world. In October 2018, Panini were awarded the licence to produce collectables from the 2019–20 season. The sports drink Lucozade was the official drink of the Premier League from 1992 to 2012, and it is the hydration partner of individual clubs. The chocolate company Cadbury has been the official snack partner of the Premier League since 2017, and sponsored the Golden Boot, Golden Glove and Playmaker of the Season awards from the 2017–18 season to 2019–20 season. The Coca-Cola Company (under its Coca-Cola Zero Sugar product line) sponsored these awards during the 2020–21 season with Castrol being the current sponsor as of the 2021–22 season.

== Finances ==
The Premier League has the highest revenue of any association football league in the world, with total club revenues of €2.48 billion in 2009–10. In 2013–14, due to improved television revenues and cost controls, the Premier League clubs collectively made a net profit in excess of £78 million, exceeding all other football leagues. In 2010 the Premier League was awarded the Queen's Award for Enterprise in the International Trade category for its outstanding contribution to international trade and the value it brings to English football and the United Kingdom's broadcasting industry.

The Premier League includes some of the richest football clubs in the world. Deloitte's "Football Money League" listed seven Premier League clubs in the top 20 for the 2009–10 season, and all 20 clubs were in the top 40 globally by the end of the 2013–14 season, largely as a result of increased broadcasting revenue. In 2019, the league generated around £3.1 billion per year in domestic and international television rights.

Premier League clubs agreed in principle in December 2012, to radical new cost controls. The two proposals consist of a break-even rule and a cap on the amount clubs can increase their wage bill by each season. With the new television deals on the horizon, momentum has been growing to find ways of preventing the majority of the cash going straight to players and agents.

Central payments for the 2016–17 season amounted to £2,398,515,773 across the 20 clubs, with each team receiving a flat participation fee of £35,301,989 and additional payments for TV broadcasts (£1,016,690 for general UK rights to match highlights, £1,136,083 for each live UK broadcast of their games and £39,090,596 for all overseas rights), commercial rights (a flat fee of £4,759,404) and a notional measure of "merit" which was based upon final league position. The merit component was a nominal sum of £1,941,609 multiplied by each finishing place, counted from the foot of the table (e.g., Burnley finished 16th in May 2017, five places counting upwards, and received 5 × £1,941,609 = £9,708,045 merit payment).

=== Relegation ===
Since its split with the Football League, established clubs in the Premier League have a funding disparity from counterparts in lower leagues. Revenue from television rights between the leagues has played a part in this.

Promoted teams have found it difficult to avoid relegation in their first Premier League season. One Premier League newcomer has been relegated back to the Football League every season, save the 2001–02, 2011–12, 2017–18 & 2022–23 seasons. In the 1997–98, 2023–24 and 2024–25 seasons, all three promoted clubs were relegated by the season's end.

The Premier League distributes a portion of its television revenue as "parachute payments" to relegated clubs for adjustment to television revenue loss. The average Premier League team receives £41 million whilst the average Championship club receives £2 million. Starting with the 2013–14 season, these payments are in excess of £60 million over four seasons. Critics maintain that the payments widen the gap between teams that have reached the Premier League and those that have not, leading to the common occurrence of teams "bouncing back" soon after their relegation.

Clubs which have failed to win immediate promotion back to the Premier League have seen financial problems, in some cases administration or liquidation. Further relegations down the footballing ladder have occurred for multiple clubs unable to cope with the gap.

== Media coverage ==
=== United Kingdom and Ireland ===
Matches broadcast in the United Kingdom and Ireland
Seasons	Sky	Others				Total
1992–2001	60	–				60
2001–2004	110	–				110
2004–2007	138	–				138
2007–2009	92	Setanta	46	–		138
2009–2010	92	ESPN	46	–		138
2010–2013	115	ESPN	23	–		138
2013–2016	116	TNT (Note: Branded BT Sport until 2023)	38	–		154
2016–2019	126	TNT	42	–		168
2019–2025	128	TNT	52	Amazon	20	200
2025–2029	215+	TNT	52	–		270

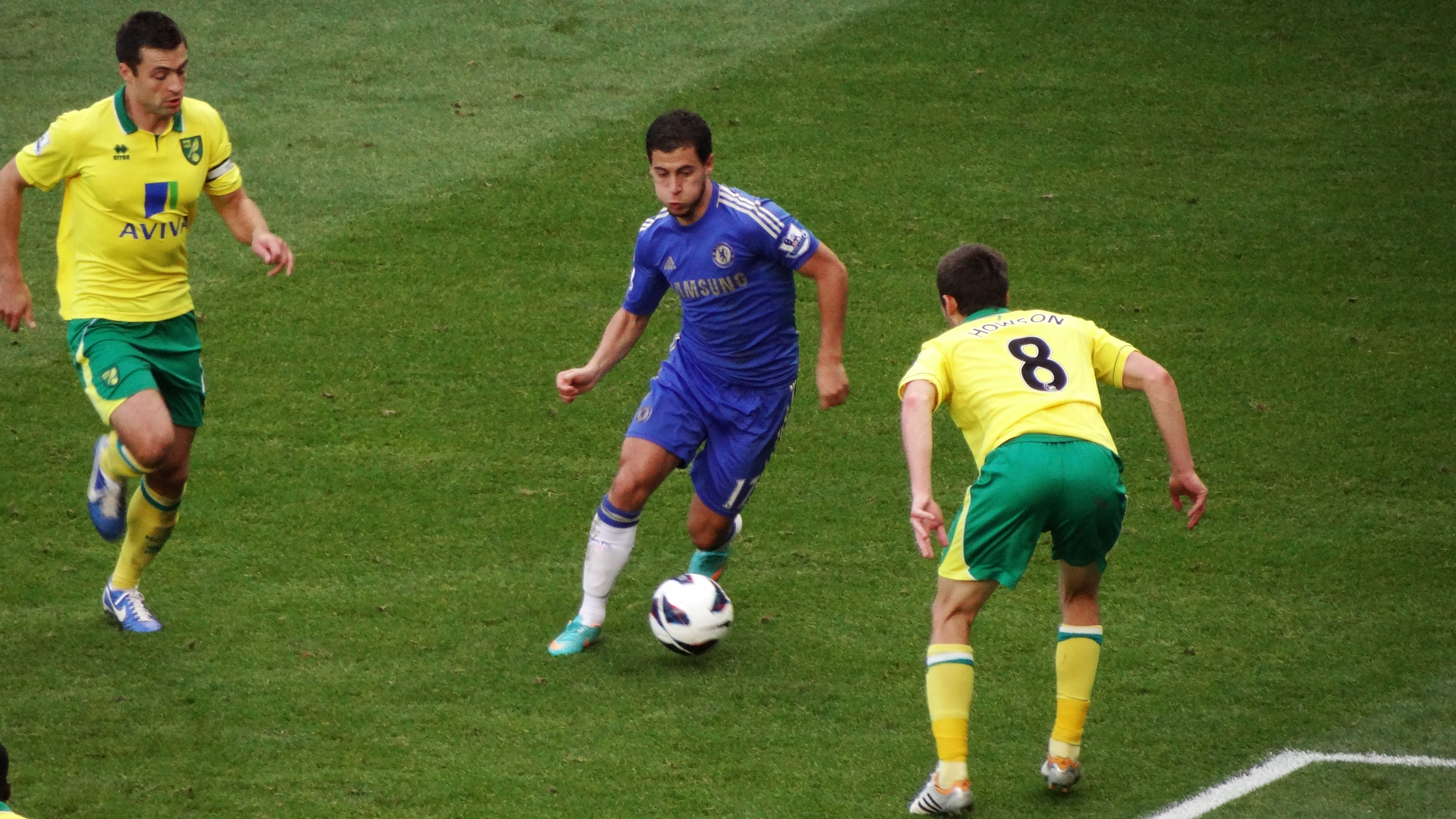
Eden Hazard in possession of the ball during a 2012 match between Chelsea and Norwich City

Television has played a major role in the history of the Premier League. The League's decision to assign broadcasting rights to Sky in 1992 was at the time a radical decision, but one that has paid off. At the time, paid television was an almost untested proposition in the UK market as was charging fans to watch live televised football. However, a combination of Sky's strategy, the quality of Premier League football and the public's appetite for the game has seen the value of the Premier League's TV rights soar.

The Premier League sells its television rights on a collective basis. This is in contrast to some other European leagues, including La Liga, in which each club sells its rights individually, leading to a much higher share of the total income going to the top few clubs. The money is divided into three parts: half is divided equally between the clubs; one quarter is awarded on a merit basis based on final league position, the top club getting twenty times as much as the bottom club, and equal steps all the way down the table; the final quarter is paid out as facilities fees for games that are shown on television, with the top clubs generally receiving the largest shares of this. The income from overseas rights is divided equally between the twenty clubs.

Not all Premier League matches are televised in the United Kingdom, as the league upholds the long-standing prohibition on telecasts of any association football match (domestic or otherwise) that kicks off between 2:45 p.m. and 5:15 p.m. on Saturday matchdays.

The first Sky television rights agreement was worth £304 million over five seasons. The next contract, negotiated to start from the 1997–98 season, rose to £670 million over four seasons. The third contract was a £1.024 billion deal with BSkyB for the three seasons from 2001 to 2004. The league brought in £320 million from the sale of its international rights for the three-year period from 2004 to 2007. It sold the rights itself on a territory-by-territory basis. Sky's monopoly was broken from August 2006 when Setanta Sports was awarded rights to show two out of the six packages of matches available. This occurred following an insistence by the European Commission that exclusive rights should not be sold to one television company. Sky and Setanta paid £1.7 billion, a two-thirds increase which took many commentators by surprise as it had been widely assumed that the value of the rights had levelled off following many years of rapid growth. Setanta also hold rights to a live 3 pm match solely for Irish viewers. The BBC retained the rights to show highlights for the same three seasons (on Match of the Day) for £171.6 million, a 63 per cent increase on the £105 million it paid for the previous three-year period. Sky and BT Group (via its new channel BT Sport, now TNT Sports) agreed to jointly pay £84.3 million for delayed television rights to 242 games (that is the right to broadcast them in full on television and over the internet) in most cases for a period of 50 hours after 10 p.m. on matchday. Overseas television rights fetched £625 million, nearly double the previous contract. The total raised from those deals was more than £2.7 billion, giving Premier League clubs an average media income from league games of around £40 million-a-year from 2007 to 2010.

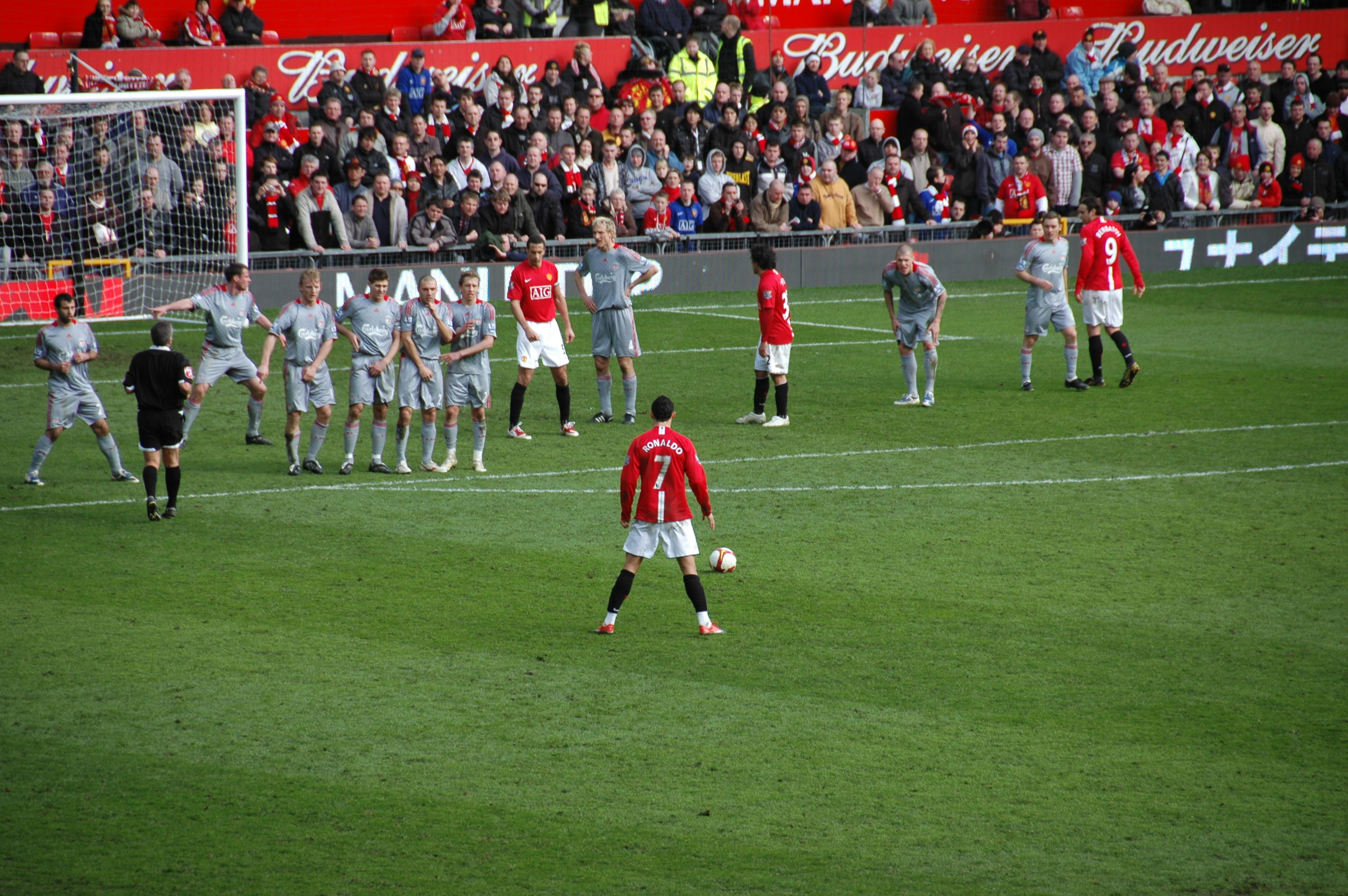
Cristiano Ronaldo preparing to take a free kick in a 2009 match between Manchester United and Liverpool

The TV rights agreement between the Premier League and Sky faced accusations of being a cartel, and a number of court cases arose as a result. An investigation by the Office of Fair Trading in 2002 found BSkyB to be dominant within the pay TV sports market, but concluded that there were insufficient grounds for the claim that BSkyB had abused its dominant position. In July 1999 the Premier League's method of selling rights collectively for all member clubs was investigated by the UK Restrictive Practices Court, which concluded that the agreement was not contrary to the public interest.

The BBC's highlights package on Saturday and Sunday nights, as well as other evenings when fixtures justify, ran until 2016. Television rights alone for the period 2010 to 2013 were purchased for £1.782 billion. On 22 June 2009, due to troubles encountered by Setanta Sports after it failed to meet a final deadline over a £30 million payment to the Premier League, ESPN was awarded two packages of UK rights containing 46 matches that were available for the 2009–10 season as well as a package of 23 matches per season from 2010 to 2013. On 13 June 2012, the Premier League announced that BT had been awarded 38 games a season for the 2013–14, 2014–15 and 2015–16 seasons at £246 million-a-year. The remaining 116 games were retained by Sky, which paid £760 million-a-year. The total domestic rights raised £3.018 billion, an increase of 70.2% over the 2010–11 to 2012–13 rights. The value of the licensing deal rose by another 70.2% in 2015, when Sky and BT paid £5.136 billion to renew their contracts with the Premier League for another three years up to the 2018–19 season.

A new rights cycle began in the 2019–20 season, with the domestic package increasing to 200 matches overall; in February 2018, BT were awarded the package of 32 lunchtime fixtures on Saturdays, whilst Sky was awarded four of the seven packages, covering the majority of weekend fixtures (including eight new prime time fixtures on Saturdays), as well as Monday and Friday matches. Two remaining packages of 20 fixtures each were to be sold at a later date, including three rounds of mid-week fixtures and a bank holiday round. As Sky already owned the maximum number of matches it could hold without breaching a 148-match cap, it was speculated that at least one of the new packages could go to a new entrant, such as a streaming service. The five packages sold to BT and Sky were valued at £4.464 billion. In June 2018, it was announced that Amazon Prime Video and BT had acquired the remaining two packages; Amazon acquired rights to 20 matches per-season, covering a mid-week round in December, and all Boxing Day fixtures. The Amazon telecasts are produced in association with Sunset + Vine and BT Sport.

With the resumption of play in the 2019–20 Premier League due to the COVID-19 pandemic in the United Kingdom, the Premier League announced that all remaining matches would be carried on British television, split primarily across Sky, BT, and Amazon. A large number of these matches were also scheduled for free-to-air broadcasts, with Sky airing 25 on Pick, Amazon streaming its four matches on Twitch, and the BBC – for the first time in league history – carrying four live matches.

As matches would continue to be played without spectators upon the start of the 2020–21 Premier League, its clubs voted on 8 September to continue broadcasting all matches through at least September (with the BBC and Amazon each holding one additional match), and "appropriate arrangements" being made for October. It was later announced that matches not selected for broadcast would be carried on pay-per-view via BT Sport Box Office and Sky Box Office at a cost of £14.95 per-match. The PPV scheme was poorly received; the Football Supporters' Federation felt that the price was too high, and there were concerns that it could encourage piracy. There were calls from supporters to boycott the pay-per-views, and make donations to support charitable causes instead (with Newcastle's "Charity Not PPV" campaign raising £20,000 for a local food bank, and Arsenal fans raising £34,000 for Islington Giving). On 13 November, amid the reintroduction of measures across the UK, the Premier League officially announced that the non-televised matches would be assigned to its main broadcast partners, and again including additional matches for the BBC and Amazon Prime.

The next cycle of rights between 2022–23 and 2024–25 season was renewed without tender due to compelling and exceptional circumstances in light of the COVID-19 pandemic. Therefore, rights remained as they were since the 2019–20 season.

UK highlights

Highlights programme	Duration	Channel
Match of the Day	1992–2001; 2004–present	BBC
The Premiership	2001–2004	ITV

In August 2016, it was announced the BBC would be creating a new magazine-style show for the Premier League entitled The Premier League Show.

=== Worldwide ===
The Premier League is the most-watched football league in the world, broadcast in 212 territories to 643 million homes and a potential TV audience of 4.7 billion people. The Premier League's production arm, Premier League Productions, is operated by IMG Productions and produces content for its international television partners. On 22 November 2024, the Premier League announced plans to end its agreement with IMG and take Premier League Productions in-house beginning in 2026–27.

The Premier League is the most widely distributed sports programme in Asia. In the Indian subcontinent, the matches are broadcast live on STAR Sports. In MENA region, BeIN Sports holds exclusive rights to the Premier League. In China, the broadcast rights were awarded to iQiyi, Migu and CCTV that began in the 2021–22 season. SCTV broadcast the matches for Indonesia, and Astro for Malaysia. In Australia, Optus telecommunications holds exclusive rights to the Premier League, providing live broadcasts and online access (Fox Sports formerly held rights). As of the 2022–23 season, Canadian media rights to the Premier League are owned by FuboTV, after having been jointly owned by Sportsnet and TSN, and most recently DAZN.

The Premier League is broadcast in the United States by NBC Sports, a division of Sky parent Comcast. Acquiring the rights to the Premier League in 2013 (replacing Fox Soccer and ESPN), NBC Sports has been widely praised for its coverage. NBC Sports reached a six-year extension with the Premier League in 2015 to broadcast the league until the end of the 2021–22 season in a deal valued at $1 billion (£640 million). In January 2022, FuboTV acquired the Canadian media rights to the Premier League, replacing DAZN.

In November 2021, NBC reached another six-year extension through 2028 in a deal valued at $2.76 billion (£2 billion).

The Premier League is broadcast by SuperSport across sub-Saharan Africa. Broadcasters to continental Europe until 2025 include Canal+ for France, Sky Sport Germany for Germany and Austria, Match TV for Russia, Sky Sport Italy for Italy, Eleven Sports for Portugal, DAZN for Spain, beIN Sports Turkey to Turkey, Digi Sport for Romania, and NENT to Nordic countries (Sweden, Denmark and Norway), Poland and the Netherlands. In South America, ESPN covers much of the continent, with coverage in Brazil shared between ESPN Brasil and ESPN4. Paramount+ broadcasts the league in Central America.

== Stadiums ==
As of the 2023–24 season, Premier League football has been played in 61 stadiums since the formation of the division. The Hillsborough disaster in 1989 and the subsequent Taylor Report saw a recommendation that standing terraces should be abolished. As a result, all stadiums in the Premier League are all-seater. Since the formation of the Premier League, football grounds in England have seen constant improvements to capacity and facilities, with some clubs moving to new-build stadiums. Eleven stadiums that have seen Premier League football have now been demolished. The stadiums for the 2026–27 season show a large disparity in capacity. For example, Old Trafford, the home of Manchester United, has a capacity of 74,031 whilst Dean Court, the home of Bournemouth, has a capacity of 12,357.

Stadium attendances are a significant source of regular income for Premier League clubs. For the 2022–23 season, average attendances across the league clubs were 40,235 for Premier League matches with an aggregate attendance of 15,289,340. This represents an increase of 19,109 from the average attendance of 21,126 recorded in the Premier League's first season (1992–93). However, during the 1992–93 season, the capacities of most stadiums were reduced as clubs replaced terraces with seats in order to meet the Taylor Report's 1994–95 deadline for all-seater stadiums. The 2022–23 season also set a competition record for total attendance with more than 15 million spectators, with average attendance also reaching record levels, surpassing the previous record of 39,989 set in the 2021–22 season, which in turn broke an over 70-year-old record set in the 1948–49 season.

In October 2024, it was reported that the government is planning to grant the independent regulator authority to stop Premier League clubs from selling their stadiums to affiliated or third-party companies.

== Managers ==
I have never known this level before. Of course, there are managers in Germany, Italy, and Spain, but in the Premier League, these are the best managers, the elite managers. The quality, the preparation. The level is so high.

— Pep Guardiola, on the quality of managers of Premier League teams.

Managers in the Premier League are involved in the day-to-day running of the team, including the training, team selection and player acquisition. Their influence varies from club-to-club and is related to the ownership of the club and the relationship of the manager with fans. Managers are required to have a UEFA Pro Licence which is the final coaching qualification available, and follows the completion of the UEFA 'B' and 'A' Licences. The UEFA Pro Licence is required by every person who wishes to manage a club in the Premier League on a permanent basis (i.e., more than 12 weeks, the amount of time an unqualified caretaker manager is allowed to take control). Caretaker appointments are managers that fill the gap between a managerial departure and a new appointment. Several caretaker managers have gone on to secure a permanent managerial post after performing well as a caretaker, including Paul Hart at Portsmouth, David Pleat at Tottenham Hotspur and Ole Gunnar Solskjær at Manchester United.

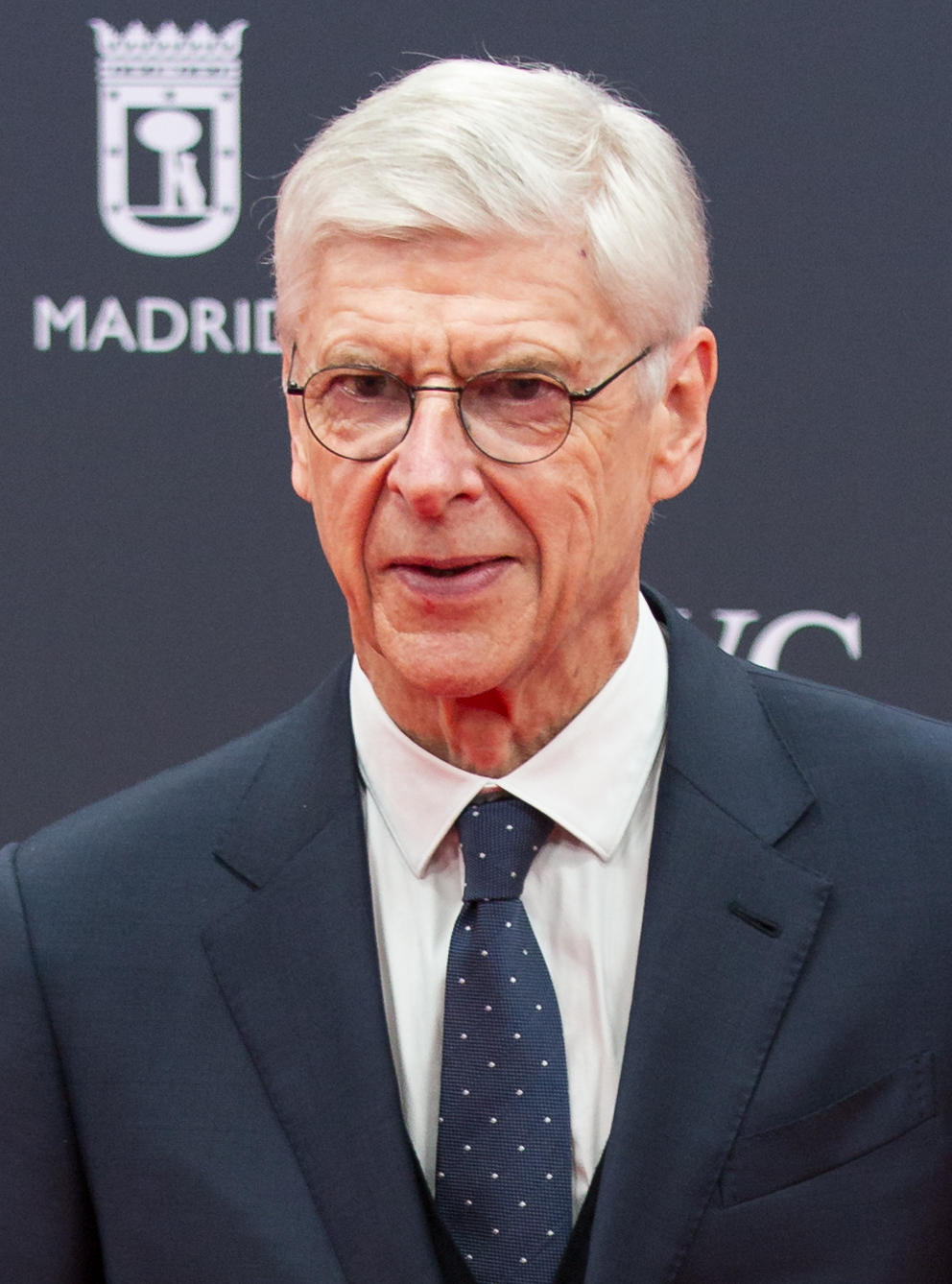
Former Arsenal manager Arsène Wenger is the longest-serving manager in Premier League history.

Arsène Wenger is the Premier League's longest-serving manager, having been in charge of Arsenal from 1996 to his departure at the conclusion of the 2017–18 season, and holds the record for most matches managed in the Premier League with 828. He broke the record set by Alex Ferguson, who had managed 810 matches with Manchester United from the Premier League's inception to his retirement at the end of the 2012–13 season. Ferguson was in charge of Manchester United from November 1986 until the end of the 2012–13 season, meaning he was manager for the last five years of the old Football League First Division and all of the first 21 seasons of the Premier League.

There have been several studies into the reasoning behind, and effects of, managerial sackings. Most famously, Sue Bridgewater of the University of Liverpool and Bas ter Weel of the University of Amsterdam, performed two separate studies which helped to explain the statistics behind managerial sackings. Bridgewater's study found clubs generally sack their managers upon dropping below an average of one point per match.

Italics indicate interim managers.

Current Premier League managers
Manager	Nationality	Club	Appointed	Time as manager
Mikel Arteta	Spain	Arsenal	20 December 2019	6 years, 331 days
Unai Emery	Spain	Aston Villa	1 November 2022	4 years, 15 days
Daniel Farke	Germany	Leeds United	4 July 2023	3 years, 135 days
Fabian Hürzeler	Germany	Brighton & Hove Albion	15 June 2024	2 years, 154 days
Régis Le Bris	France	Sunderland	1 July 2024	2 years, 138 days
Frank Lampard	England	Coventry City	28 November 2024	1 year, 353 days
David Moyes	Scotland	Everton	11 January 2025	1 year, 309 days
Sergej Jakirović	Bosnia and Herzegovina	Hull City	11 June 2025	1 year, 158 days
Keith Andrews	Ireland	Brentford	27 June 2025	1 year, 142 days
Roberto De Zerbi	Italy	Tottenham Hotspur	31 March 2026	230 days
Marco Rose	Germany	Bournemouth	1 June 2026	168 days
Andoni Iraola	Spain	Liverpool	4 June 2026	165 days
Gary O'Neil	England	Ipswich Town	23 June 2026	146 days
Enzo Maresca	Italy	Manchester City	29 June 2026	140 days
Xabi Alonso	Spain	Chelsea	1 July 2026	138 days
Oliver Glasner	Austria	Nottingham Forest	6 July 2026	133 days
Álvaro Arbeloa	Spain	Fulham	7 July 2026	132 days
Matthias Jaissle	Germany	Newcastle United	5 August 2026	103 days
Thomas Frank	Denmark	Crystal Palace	16 November 2026	0 days
Mauricio Pochettino	Argentina	Manchester United	18 November 2026	−2 days

== Players ==
=== Appearances ===
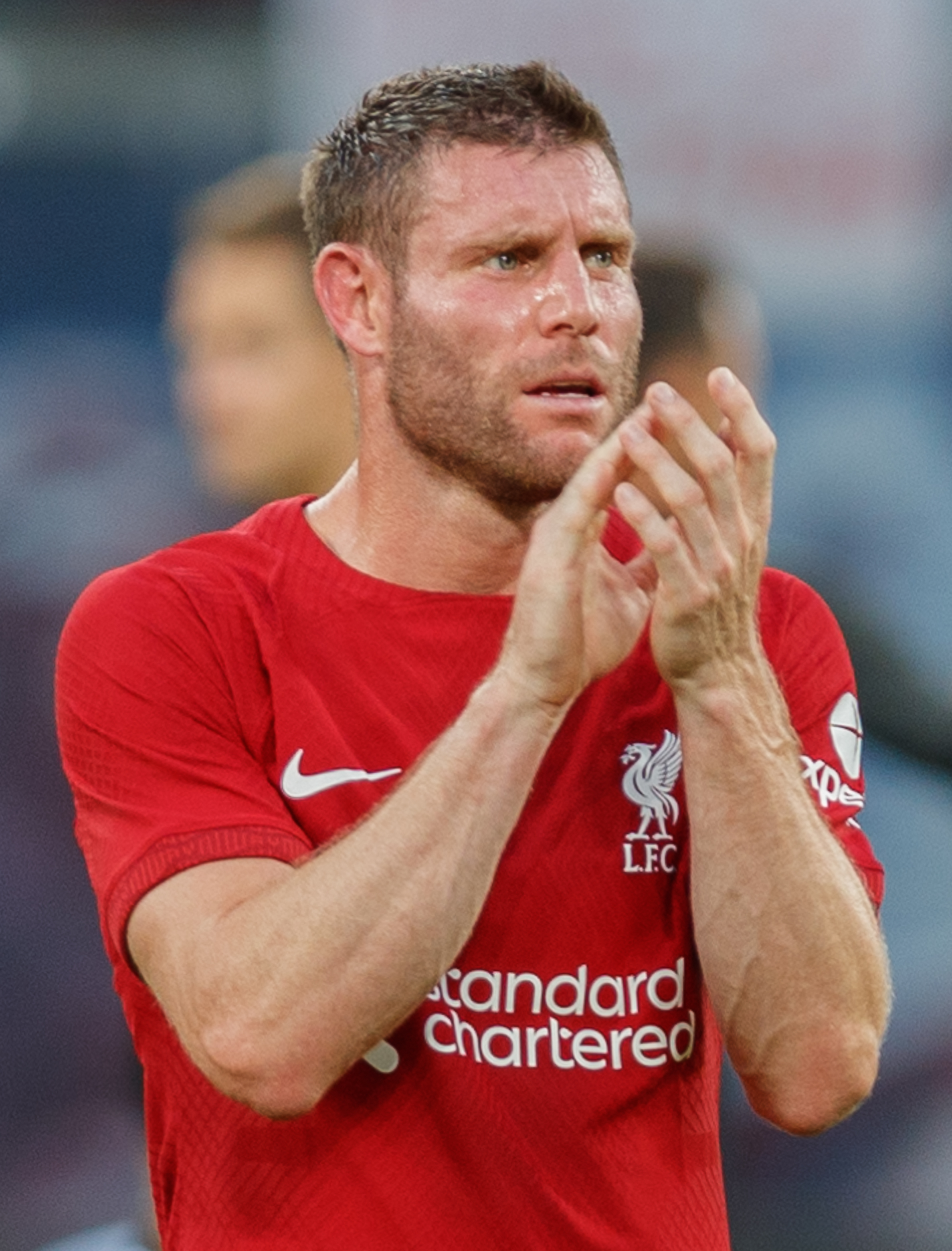
James Milner holds the record for most appearances in the Premier League.

Most appearances
Rank	Player	Apps
1	(England) James Milner	658
2	(England) Gareth Barry	653
3	(Wales) Ryan Giggs	632
4	(England) Frank Lampard	609
5	(England) David James	572
6	(Wales) Gary Speed	535
7	(England) Emile Heskey	516
8	(Australia) Mark Schwarzer	514
9	(England) Jamie Carragher	508
10	(England) Phil Neville	505
As of 24 May 2026. Italicised players still playing professional football. **Bolded** players still playing in Premier League.

=== Transfer regulations and foreign players ===
Player transfers may only take place within transfer windows set by the Football Association. The two transfer windows run from the last day of the season to 31 August and from 31 December to 31 January. Player registrations cannot be exchanged outside these windows except under specific licence from the FA, usually on an emergency basis. As of the 2010–11 season, the Premier League introduced new rules mandating that each club must register a maximum 25-man squad of players aged over 21, with the squad list only allowed to be changed in transfer windows or in exceptional circumstances. This was to enable the "home grown" rule to be enacted, whereby the Premier League would also from 2010 require at least eight members of the named 25-man squad to be "home-grown players".

At the inception of the Premier League in 1992–93, just 11 players named in the starting line-ups for the first round of matches hailed from outside of the United Kingdom or Ireland. By 2000–01, the number of foreign players participating in the Premier League was 36% of the total. In the 2004–05 season, the figure had increased to 45%. On 26 December 1999, Chelsea became the first Premier League side to field an entirely foreign starting line-up, and on 14 February 2005, Arsenal were the first to name a completely foreign 16-man squad for a match. By 2009, under 40% of the players in the Premier League were English. By February 2020, 117 different nationalities had played in the Premier League, and 101 nationalities had scored in the competition.

In 1999, in response to concerns that clubs were increasingly passing over young English players in favour of foreign players, the Home Office tightened its rules for granting work permits to players from countries outside of the European Union. A non-EU player applying for the permit must have played for his country in at least 75 per cent of its competitive 'A' team matches for which he was available for selection during the previous two years, and his country must have averaged at least 70th place in the official FIFA world rankings over the previous two years. If a player does not meet those criteria, the club wishing to sign him may appeal.

Following the implementation of Brexit in January 2021, new regulations were introduced which require all foreign players to obtain a Governing Body Endorsement (GBE) in order to play football in the United Kingdom, regardless of EU status.

=== Top scorers ===
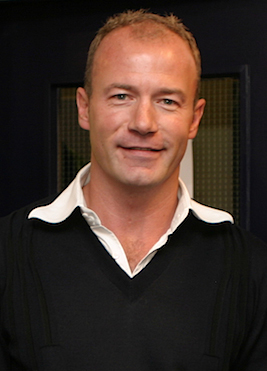
Alan Shearer is the top scorer in Premier League history with 260 goals.

As of 24 May 2026.

Rank	Player	Years	Goals	Apps	Ratio
1	(England) Alan Shearer	1992–2006	260	441	0.59
2	(England) Harry Kane	2012–2023	213	320	0.67
3	(England) Wayne Rooney	2002–2018	208	491	0.42
4	(Egypt) Mohamed Salah	2014–2015, 2017–2026	193	328	0.59
5	(England) Andy Cole	1992–2008	187	414	0.45
6	(Argentina) Sergio Agüero	2011–2021	184	275	0.67
7	(England) Frank Lampard	1995–2015	177	609	0.29
8	(France) Thierry Henry	1999–2007, 2012	175	258	0.68
9	(England) Robbie Fowler	1993–2007, 2008	163	379	0.43
10	(England) Jermain Defoe	2001–2003, 2004–2014, 2015–2019	162	496	0.33

Italics denotes players still playing professional football,
Bold denotes players still playing in the Premier League.

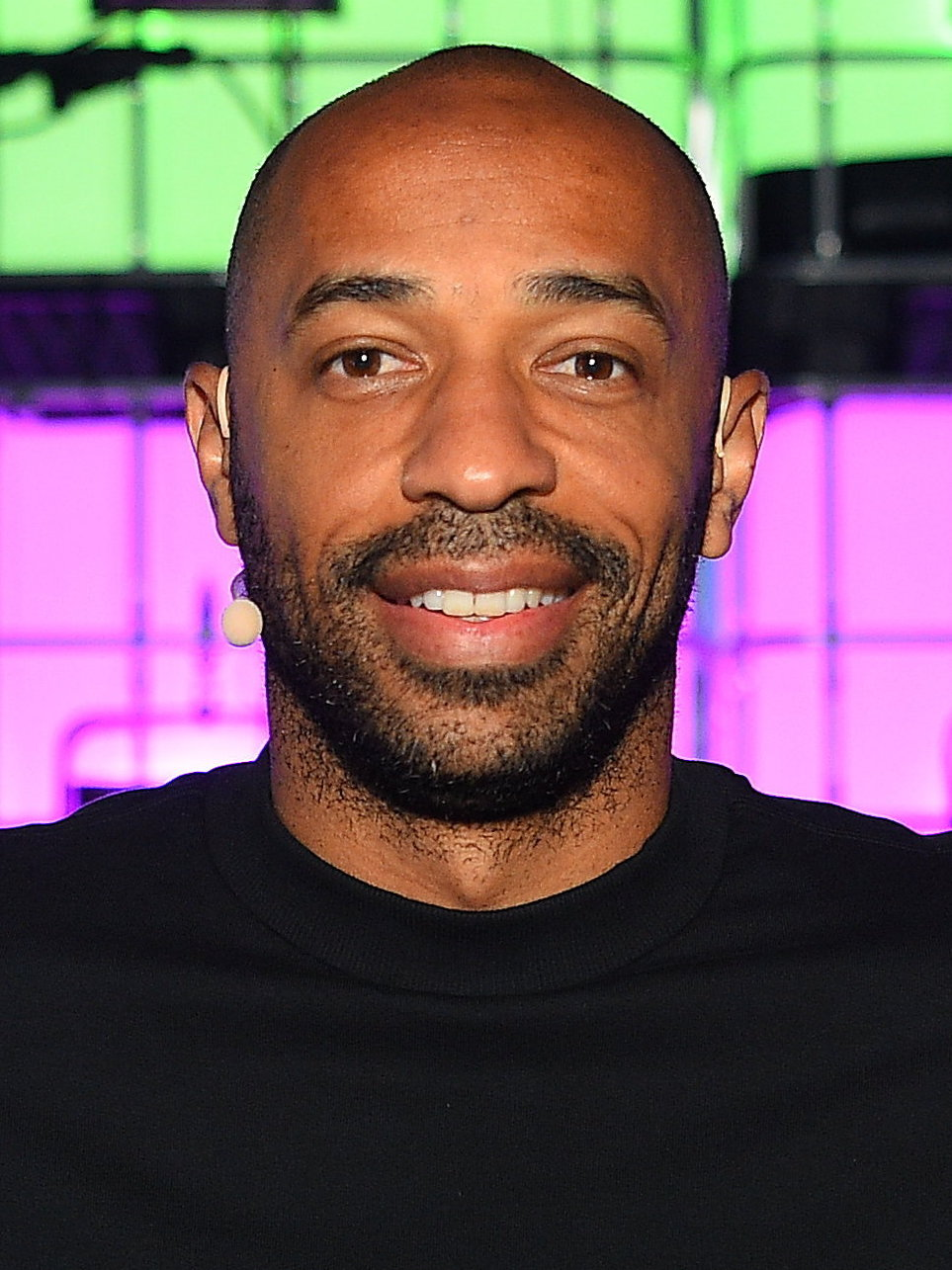
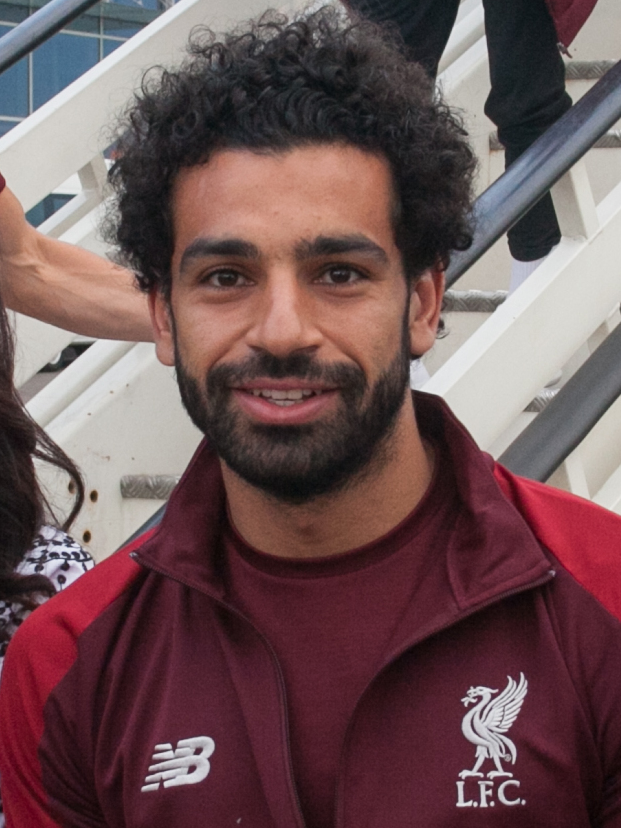
Thierry Henry (left) and Mohamed Salah (right) won the most Golden Boot awards with four each.

The Premier League Golden Boot is awarded each season to the top scorer in the division. Former Blackburn Rovers and Newcastle United striker Alan Shearer holds the record for most Premier League goals with 260. Thirty-five players have reached the 100-goal mark. Since the first Premier League season in 1992–93, 23 players from 11 clubs have won or shared the top scorer title. Thierry Henry won his fourth overall scoring title by scoring 27 goals in the 2005–06 season. Erling Haaland holds the record for most goals in a Premier League season (38 matches), with 36 goals in the 2022–23 season. Ryan Giggs of Manchester United holds the record for scoring goals in consecutive seasons, having scored in the first 21 seasons of the league. Giggs also holds the record for the most Premier League assists, with 162.

=== Wages ===
There is no team or individual salary cap in the Premier League. As a result of the increasingly lucrative television deals, player wages rose sharply following the formation of the Premier League, when the average player wage was £75,000 per year. In the 2018–19 season the average annual salary stood at £2.99 million.

The total salary bill for the 20 Premier League clubs in the 2018–19 season was £1.62 billion; this compares to £1.05 billion in La Liga, £0.83 billion in Serie A, £0.72 billion in Bundesliga, and £0.54 billion in Ligue 1. The club with the highest average wage is Manchester United at £6.5 million. This is smaller than the club with the highest wage bill in Spain (Barcelona £10.5 million) and Italy (Juventus £6.7 million), but higher than in Germany (Bayern Munich £6.4 million) and France (Paris Saint-Germain £6.1 million). For the 2018–19 season, the ratio of the wages of the highest-paid team to lowest-paid in the Premier League is 6.82 to 1. This is much lower than in La Liga (19.1 to 1), Serie A (16 to 1), Bundesliga (20.5 to 1), and Ligue 1 (26.6 to 1). Because of the lower differential between team wage bills in the Premier League, it is often regarded as being more competitive than other top European leagues.

=== Player transfer fees ===
The record transfer fee for a Premier League player has risen steadily over the lifetime of the competition. Before the start of the first Premier League season, Alan Shearer became the first British player to command a transfer fee of more than £3 million. Enzo Fernandez and Alexander Isak are currently the most expensive transfer fees paid by Premier League clubs at £125 million each, as well as the biggest transfers involving a Premier League club.

Top transfer fees paid by Premier League clubs
Rank	Player	Fee (£ million)	Year	Transfer		Reference(s)
1	(Argentina) Enzo Fernández	£125	2026	(England) Chelsea	(England) Manchester City	
1	(Sweden) Alexander Isak	£125	2025	(England) Newcastle United	(England) Liverpool	
3	(England) Morgan Rogers	£117	2026	(England) Aston Villa	(England) Chelsea	
4	(England) Elliot Anderson	£116	2026	(England) Nottingham Forest	(England) Manchester City	
5	(Argentina) Enzo Fernández	£106.8	2023	(Portugal) Benfica	(England) Chelsea	
6	(France) Bradley Barcola	£106	2026	(France) Paris Saint-Germain	(England) Liverpool	
7	(England) Jack Grealish	£100	2021	(England) Aston Villa	(England) Manchester City	
7	(England) Declan Rice	£100 (Note: Initial £100 million plus a reported £5 million in bonuses)	2023	(England) West Ham United	(England) Arsenal	
7	(Ecuador) Moisés Caicedo	£100 (Note: Initial £100 million plus a reported £15 million in bonuses)	2023	(England) Brighton & Hove Albion	(England) Chelsea	
7	(Germany) Florian Wirtz	£100 (Note: Initial £100 million plus a reported £16 million in bonuses)	2025	(Germany) Bayer Leverkusen	(England) Liverpool	

Top transfer fees received by Premier League clubs
Rank	Player	Fee (£ million)	Year	Transfer		Reference(s)
1	(Argentina) Enzo Fernández	£125	2026	(England) Chelsea	(England) Manchester City	
1	(Sweden) Alexander Isak	£125	2025	(England) Newcastle United	(England) Liverpool	
3	(England) Morgan Rogers	£117	2026	(England) Aston Villa	(England) Chelsea	
4	(England) Elliot Anderson	£116	2026	(England) Nottingham Forest	(England) Manchester City	
5	(Brazil) Philippe Coutinho	£105 (Note: Initial £105 million plus reported £37 million bonuses)	2018	(England) Liverpool	(Spain) Barcelona	
6	(England) Jack Grealish	£100	2021	(England) Aston Villa	(England) Manchester City	
6	(England) Declan Rice	£100 (Note: Initial £100 million plus a reported £5 million in bonuses)	2023	(England) West Ham United	(England) Arsenal	
6	(Ecuador) Moisés Caicedo	£100 (Note: Initial £100 million plus a reported £15 million in bonuses)	2023	(England) Brighton & Hove Albion	(England) Chelsea	
9	(Italy) Sandro Tonali	£92.5 (Note: Initial £92.5 million plus a reported £7.5 million in bonuses)	2026	(England) Newcastle United	(England) Tottenham Hotspur	
10	(Belgium) Eden Hazard	£89 (Note: Initial £89 million plus a reported £60 million in bonuses)	2019	(England) Chelsea	(Spain) Real Madrid	

=== Most wins ===
Players with seven or more Premier League titles (winners' medals).

No. of wins	Player	Club(s)
**13**	(Wales) Ryan Giggs	Manchester United (1992–93, 1993–94, 1995–96, 1996–97, 1998–99, 1999–2000, 2000–01, 2002–03, 2006–07, 2007–08, 2008–09, 2010–11, 2012–13)
**11**	(England) Paul Scholes	Manchester United (1995–96, 1996–97, 1998–99, 1999–2000, 2000–01, 2002–03, 2006–07, 2007–08, 2008–09, 2010–11, 2012–13)
**8**	(England) Gary Neville	Manchester United (1995–96, 1996–97, 1998–99, 1999–2000, 2000–01, 2002–03, 2006–07, 2008–09)
**7**	(Republic of Ireland) Denis Irwin	Manchester United (1992–93, 1993–94, 1995–96, 1996–97, 1998–99, 1999–2000, 2000–01)
**7**	(Republic of Ireland) Roy Keane	Manchester United (1993–94, 1995–96, 1996–97, 1998–99, 1999–2000, 2000–01, 2002–03)

== Awards ==
=== Trophy ===
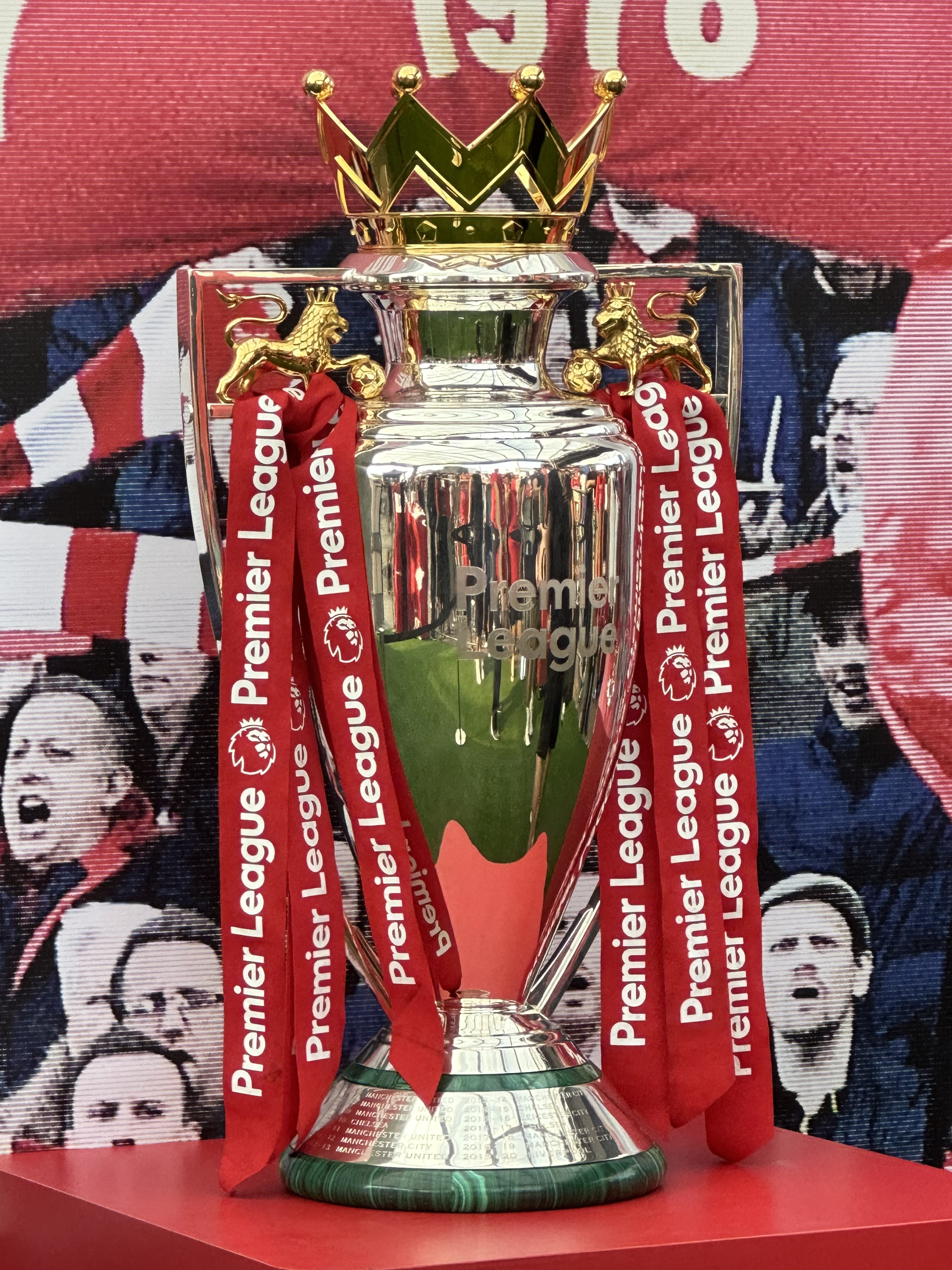
The Premier League trophy

The Premier League maintains two trophies – the genuine trophy (held by the reigning champions) and a spare replica. Two trophies are held for the purpose of making the award within minutes of the title being secured, in the event that on the final day of the season two clubs are still within reach of winning the League. In the rare event that more than two clubs are vying for the title on the final day of the season, a replica won by a previous club is used.

The current Premier League trophy was created by Royal Jewellers Garrard & Co/Asprey of London and was designed in house at Garrard & Co by Trevor Brown and Paul Marsden. It consists of a trophy with a golden crown and a malachite plinth base. The plinth weighs 33 pounds (15 kg) and the trophy weighs 22 pounds (10.0 kg). The trophy and plinth are 76 cm (30 in) tall, 43 cm (17 in) wide and 25 cm (9.8 in) deep.

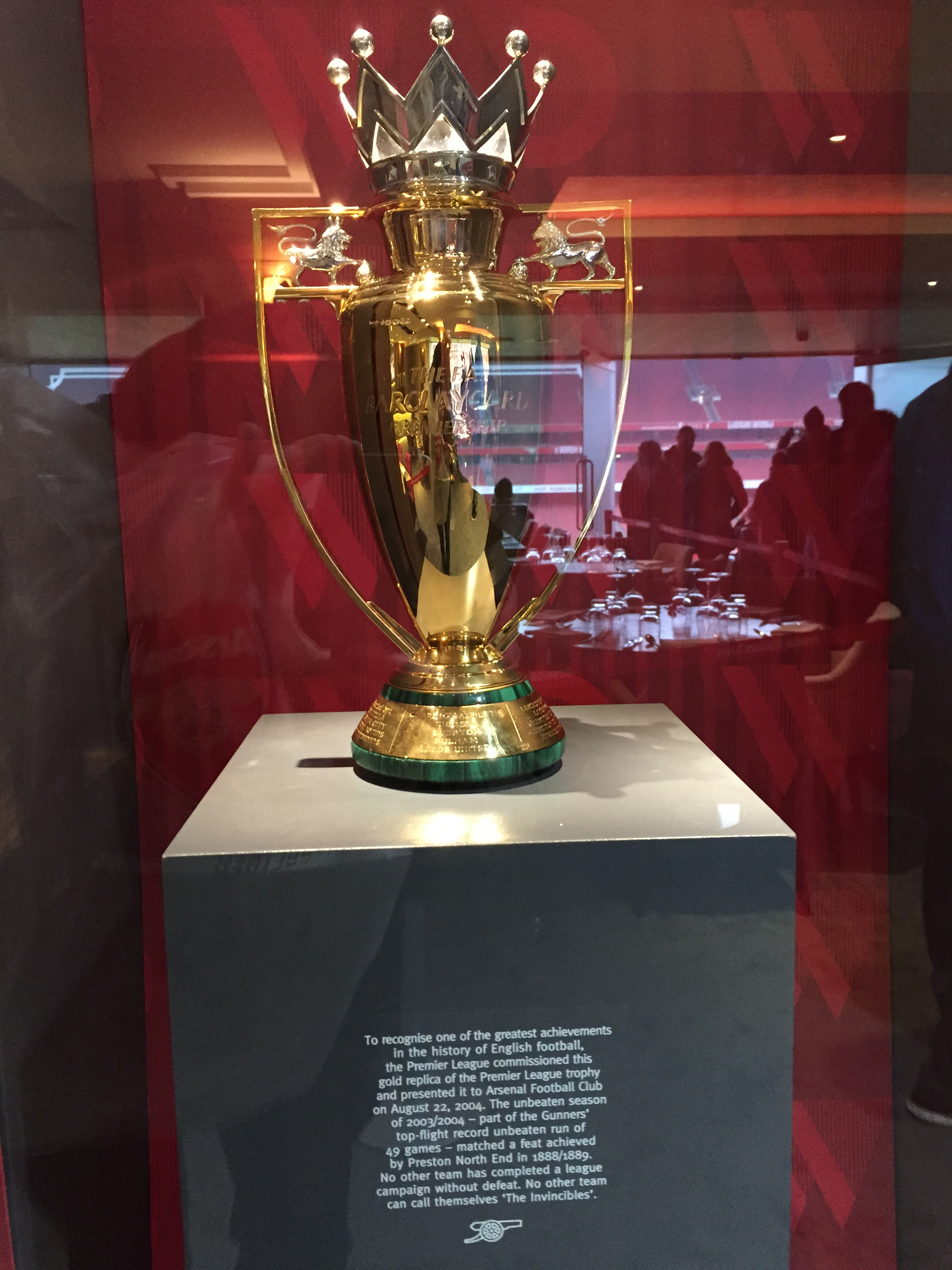
The gold Premier League trophy awarded to Arsenal for winning the 2003–04 title without defeat

Its main body is solid sterling silver and silver gilt, whilst its plinth is made of malachite, a semi-precious stone. The plinth has a silver band around its circumference, upon which the names of the title-winning clubs are listed. The green of the malachite represents the green field of play. The design of the trophy is based on the heraldry of Three Lions that is associated with English football. Two of the lions are found above the handles on either side of the trophy – the third is symbolised by the captain of the title-winning team as he raises the trophy, and its gold crown, above his head at the end of the season. The ribbons that drape the handles are presented in the team colours of the league champions that year. In 2004, a special gold version of the trophy was commissioned to commemorate Arsenal winning the title without a single defeat.

=== Player and manager awards ===
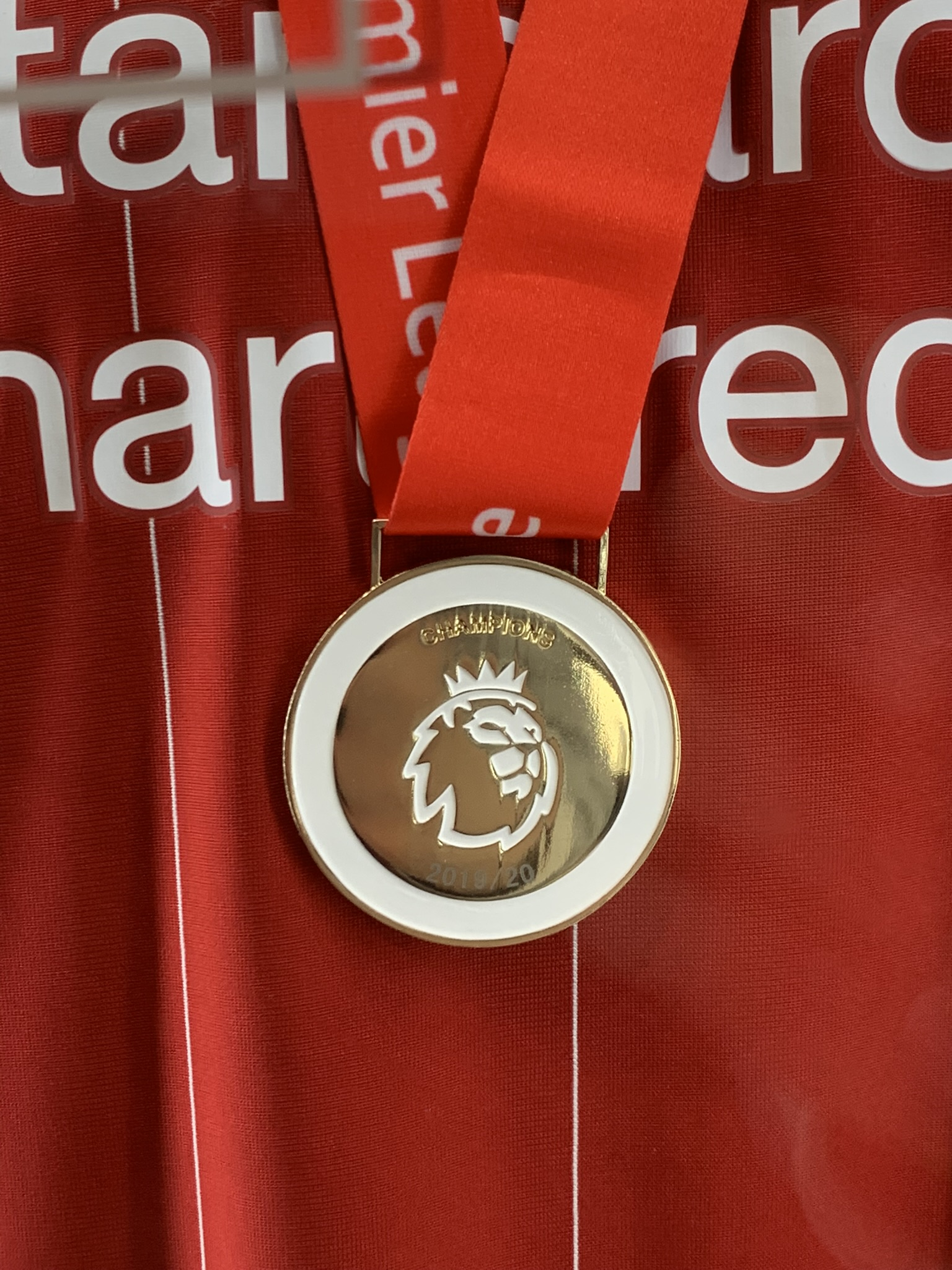
A Premier League winner's medal awarded to Liverpool players in 2019–20

In addition to the winner's trophy and the individual winner's medals awarded to players who win the title, the Premier League also issues other awards throughout the season. A man-of-the-match award is awarded to the player who has the greatest impact in an individual match. Monthly awards are also given for the Manager of the Month, Player of the Month and Goal of the Month. These are also issued annually for Manager of the Season, Player of the Season and Goal of the Season. The Young Player of the Season award is given to the most outstanding U-23 player starting from the 2019–20 season.

The Golden Boot award is given to the top goalscorer of every season, the Playmaker of the Season award is given to the player who makes the most assists of every season, and the Golden Glove award is given to the goalkeeper with the most clean sheets at the end of the season.

Starting with the 2021–22 season, four new awards are given. The Save of the Season is awarded to the goalkeeper deemed to have made the most impressive save. The Game Changer of the Season is earned by the player with the single most game-changing performance over the course of the campaign. The Most Powerful Goal is given to the player whose goal-scoring shot had the highest average velocity from the time it was struck to the time it crossed the goal line, and the Most Improbable Comeback award is meant for the team that, based on calculations performed by Oracle Corporation, goes behind and overcomes a deficit to win their respective match.

From the 2017–18 season, players receive a milestone award for 100 appearances and every century there after and also players who score 50 goals and multiples thereof. Each player to reach these milestones is to receive a presentation box from the Premier League containing a special medallion and a plaque commemorating their achievement.

=== 20 Seasons Awards ===
In 2012, the Premier League celebrated its second decade by holding the 20 Seasons Awards:

- Fantasy Team of the 20 Seasons
  - Panel Choice: Peter Schmeichel, Gary Neville, Tony Adams, Rio Ferdinand, Ashley Cole, Cristiano Ronaldo, Roy Keane, Paul Scholes, Ryan Giggs, Thierry Henry, Alan Shearer
  - Public Vote: Peter Schmeichel, Gary Neville, Tony Adams, Nemanja Vidić, Ashley Cole, Cristiano Ronaldo, Steven Gerrard, Paul Scholes, Ryan Giggs, Thierry Henry, Alan Shearer
- Best Manager: Sir Alex Ferguson
- Best Player: Ryan Giggs
- Most Appearances: Gareth Barry (652)
- Top Goalscorer: Alan Shearer (260)
- Most Clean Sheets: David James (173)
- 500 Club: Steven Gerrard, Jamie Carragher, Gareth Barry, Ryan Giggs, David James, Gary Speed, Frank Lampard, Emile Heskey and Sol Campbell
- Best Goal: Wayne Rooney, 12 February 2011, Manchester United vs Manchester City
- Best Save: Craig Gordon, 18 December 2010, Sunderland vs Bolton Wanderers
- Best Team: Arsenal 2003–04

== See also ==
- List of English football champions
- List of English Football League managers
- FA Women's Super League (highest league of women's football in England)
- Football records and statistics in England
- List of professional sports teams in the United Kingdom
- Cymru Premier
- Scottish Premiership
- NIFL Premiership
