= Alison Brittain =

British businesswoman (born 1965)

Alison Brittain CBE
- Born: Alison Jane Hopkins; February 1965 (age 61)
- Education: University of Stirling; Cambridge Judge Business School
- Occupation: Businesswoman
- Title: Chair, Premier League
- Children: 2

Alison Jane Brittain CBE (née Hopkins; born February 1965) is a British businesswoman, chair of the Premier League, and the former chief executive officer (CEO) of Whitbread. She was previously head of retail banking at Lloyds Banking Group.

== Early life ==
Alison Jane Hopkins was born in February 1965. She grew up in Derbyshire, and was educated at the University of Stirling, where she received a degree in business studies, followed by an MBA from the Cambridge Judge Business School. When studying at the University of Cambridge, she matriculated at Girton College.

== Career ==
Brittain joined Barclays as a graduate trainee, and worked there for 19 years. She joined Santander UK in 2007, then Lloyds Banking Group in 2011.

In May 2015, it was announced that from January 2016, Brittain would take over from Andy Harrison, who would be retiring, as CEO of Whitbread, the parent company of Premier Inn, Whitbread restaurants and Costa Coffee. Brittain had been seen as a favourite to succeed the current CEO of Lloyd's Banking Group, António Horta-Osório before this news was announced.

She was appointed Commander of the Order of the British Empire (CBE) in the 2019 New Year Honours for services to business.

In July 2022, the Premier League announced that Brittain would be taking up its role of chair from early 2023. In January 2023, she stood down as CEO of Whitbread and became chair of the Premier League.

== Personal life ==
Alison Hopkins is married to Kevin Brittain; and they have two children.

Business positions
Preceded by Andy Harrison	CEO of Whitbread; 2015–present	Incumbent
