= Susan Hooper =

British businesswoman

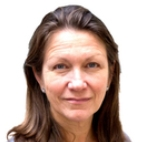
- Born: 1960 or 1961 (age 65–66)
- Education: Johns Hopkins University
- Occupation: Businesswoman
- Board member of: Wizz Air; Department for Exiting the European Union; Rank Group; Affinity Water; Uber
- Spouse: Alan Parker (m. 2016)

Susan Hooper (born c. 1960) is a British businesswoman.

== Early life ==
Hooper was born circa 1960–1961. She earned bachelor's and master's degrees in international politics and economics from Johns Hopkins University's School of Advanced International Studies (SAIS).

== Career ==
Hooper was CEO of the travel division of Acromas Holdings, which includes Saga Travel, Titan Holidays, and travel division of the AA. Hooper has been managing director of British Gas Residential Services.

Hooper is a non-executive director of Wizz Air, the Department for Exiting the European Union (DExEU), the Rank Group and Affinity Water. In April 2018, Hooper was appointed a non-executive director of Uber.
