= Alan C. Parker =

British businessman (born 1946)

- Born: Alan Charles Parker; November 1946 (age 79); U.K.
- Education: University of Surrey
- Occupation: Businessman
- Known for: CEO of Whitbread, 2004-10
- Title: Chairman, Mothercare
- Spouse: Susan Hooper (m. 2016)

Alan Charles Parker CBE (born November 1946) is a British businessman, chairman of Mothercare, and former CEO of Whitbread.

== Early life ==
Parker earned a bachelor's degree in Hotel and Catering Management from the University of Surrey.

== Career ==
Parker was CEO of Whitbread from June 2004 until he retired on his 64th birthday, in November 2010.

He has been non-executive chairman of Mothercare since August 2011.

Parker is a visiting professor at the University of Surrey.
