= 2020–21 Southampton F.C. season =

Southampton
2020–21 season
- Chairman: Gao Jisheng
- Manager: Ralph Hasenhüttl
- Stadium: St Mary's Stadium
- Premier League: 15th
- FA Cup: Semi-finals
- EFL Cup: Second round
- Top goalscorer: League: Danny Ings (12); All: Danny Ings (13)
- Highest home attendance: 7,291 v Leeds United (18 May 2021)
- Lowest home attendance: 2,000 two fixtures
- Average home league attendance: 3,763 (not including 'Behind closed doors' matches)
| Home colours | Away colours | Third colours |

The 2020–21 Southampton F.C. season was the club's 104th season in existence and the club's 9th consecutive season in the top flight of English football. In addition to the domestic league, Southampton participated in the season's editions of the FA Cup, and the EFL Cup.

This is the first season since 2015–16 to not feature Sofiane Boufal and Pierre-Emile Højbjerg, who respectively departed to joined Angers and Tottenham Hotspur.

== Squad ==
- Ages as of the end of the 2020–21 season

| N | Pos. | Nat. | Name | Age | EU | Since | App | Goals | Ends | Transfer fee | Notes |
|---|---|---|---|---|---|---|---|---|---|---|---|
| 1 | GK | (England) | Alex McCarthy | 31 | EU | Summer 2016 | 112 | 0 | 2022 | Undisclosed | |
| 2 | DF | (England) | Kyle Walker-Peters | 24 | EU | Summer 2020 | 45 | 0 | 2025 | Undisclosed | |
| 3 | DF | (England) | Ryan Bertrand | 31 | EU | Winter 2015 | 240 | 8 | 2021 | Undisclosed | |
| 4 | DF | (Denmark) | Jannik Vestergaard | 28 | EU | Summer 2018 | 79 | 4 | 2022 | Undisclosed | |
| 5 | DF | (England) | Jack Stephens | 27 | EU | Summer 2011 | 133 | 6 | 2022 | Undisclosed | |
| 6 | MF | (Spain) | Oriol Romeu | 29 | EU | Summer 2015 | 212 | 7 | 2023 | £5M | |
| 8 | MF | (England) | James Ward-Prowse | 26 | EU | 2003 | 322 | 33 | 2025 | Academy | Captain |
| 9 | FW | (England) | Danny Ings | 28 | EU | Summer 2019 | 100 | 46 | 2022 | £20M | Current record signing |
| 10 | FW | (Scotland) | Ché Adams | 24 | EU | Summer 2019 | 77 | 13 | 2024 | Undisclosed | |
| 11 | MF | (England) | Nathan Redmond | 27 | EU | Summer 2016 | 199 | 27 | 2023 | Undisclosed | |
| 12 | MF | (Mali) | Moussa Djenepo | 22 | Non-EU | Summer 2019 | 51 | 4 | 2023 | Undisclosed | |
| 14 | FW | (Republic of Ireland) | Michael Obafemi | 20 | EU | 2016 | 38 | 5 | 2022 | Academy | |
| 17 | MF | (Scotland) | Stuart Armstrong | 29 | EU | Summer 2018 | 104 | 14 | 2024 | £7M | |
| 19 | MF | (Japan) | Takumi Minamino | 26 | Non-EU | Winter 2021 | 10 | 2 | 2021 | Loan | On loan from Liverpool |
| 20 | MF | (Republic of Ireland) | Will Smallbone | 21 | EU | 2008 | 13 | 1 | 2024 | Academy | |
| 22 | DF | (Ghana) | Mohammed Salisu | 22 | Non-EU | Summer 2020 | 15 | 0 | 2024 | Undisclosed | |
| 23 | MF | (England) | Nathan Tella | 21 | EU | 2017 | 23 | 1 | 2023 | Academy | |
| 27 | MF | (France) | Ibrahima Diallo | 22 | EU | Summer 2020 | 26 | 0 | 2024 | Undisclosed | |
| 32 | FW | (England) | Theo Walcott | 32 | EU | Summer 2020 | 46 | 8 | 2021 | Loan | On loan from Everton |
| 35 | DF | (Poland) | Jan Bednarek | 25 | EU | Summer 2017 | 115 | 3 | 2025 | £5M | |
| 40 | FW | (England) | Dan Nlundulu | 22 | EU | 2013 | 16 | 1 | 2022 | Academy | |
| 41 | GK | (England) | Harry Lewis | 23 | EU | Summer 2015 | 3 | 0 | 2021 | Undisclosed | |
| 44 | GK | (England) | Fraser Forster | 33 | EU | Summer 2014 | 138 | 0 | 2022 | Undisclosed | |

== Transfers ==
Players transferred in

| Date | Pos. | Name | Club | Fee | Ref. |
|---|---|---|---|---|---|
| 11 August 2020 | DF | (England) Kyle Walker-Peters | (England) Tottenham Hotspur | Undisclosed | |
| 12 August 2020 | DF | (Ghana) Mohammed Salisu | (Spain) Real Valladolid | Undisclosed | |
| 4 October 2020 | MF | (France) Ibrahima Diallo | (France) Stade Brest | Undisclosed | |

Players loaned in

| Date | Pos. | Name | Club | Duration | Ref. |
|---|---|---|---|---|---|
| 5 October 2020 | FW | (England) Theo Walcott | (England) Everton | End of season | |
| 1 February 2021 | MF | (Japan) Takumi Minamino | (England) Liverpool | End of season | |

Players transferred out

| Date | Pos. | Name | Club | Fee | Ref. |
|---|---|---|---|---|---|
| 26 May 2020 | MF | (Norway) Kornelius Hansen | (Norway) Stabæk | Compensation | |
| 11 August 2020 | MF | (Denmark) Pierre-Emile Højbjerg | (England) Tottenham Hotspur | Undisclosed | |
| 30 August 2020 | MF | (England) Harrison Reed | (England) Fulham | Undisclosed | |
| 4 September 2020 | DF | (England) Alfie Jones | (England) Hull City | Undisclosed | |
| 5 October 2020 | MF | (Morocco) Sofiane Boufal | (France) Angers | Free transfer | |
| 5 October 2020 | DF | (Austria) Christoph Klarer | (Germany) Fortuna Düsseldorf | Undisclosed | |
| 20 January 2021 | MF | (England) Tyreke Johnson | (England) Gillingham | Undisclosed | |

Players loaned out

| Date | Pos. | Name | Club | Duration | Ref. |
|---|---|---|---|---|---|
| 24 February 2020 | MF | (England) Tyreke Johnson | (United States) Hartford Athletic | 8 October 2020 | |
| 30 June 2020 | MF | (Norway) Mohamed Elyounoussi | (Scotland) Celtic | End of season | |
| 30 August 2020 | MF | (Gabon) Mario Lemina | (England) Fulham | End of season | |
| 12 September 2020 | GK | (England) Jack Bycroft | (England) Weymouth | 31 December 2020 | |
| 29 September 2020 | MF | (Republic of Ireland) Thomas O'Connor | (England) Gillingham | End of season | |
| 5 October 2020 | DF | (Netherlands) Wesley Hoedt | (Italy) Lazio | End of season | |
| 16 October 2020 | GK | (England) Angus Gunn | (England) Stoke City | End of season | |
| 16 October 2020 | MF | (England) Jake Hesketh | (England) Crawley Town | End of season | |
| 16 October 2020 | MF | (England) Josh Sims | (England) Doncaster Rovers | End of season | |
| 8 January 2021 | MF | (England) Tyreke Johnson | (England) Gillingham | 20 January 2021 | |
| 14 January 2021 | MF | (England) Callum Slattery | (England) Gillingham | End of season | |
| 29 January 2021 | DF | (England) Jake Vokins | (England) Sunderland | End of season | |
| 1 February 2021 | FW | (Republic of Ireland) Shane Long | (England) Bournemouth | End of season | |
| 1 February 2021 | DF | (France) Yan Valery | (England) Birmingham City | End of season | |

Players released

| Date | Pos. | Name | Subsequent club | Join date | Ref. |
|---|---|---|---|---|---|
| 30 June 2020 | DF | (Portugal) Cédric Soares | (England) Arsenal | 1 July 2020 | |
| 30 June 2020 | DF | (Republic of Ireland) Aaron O'Driscoll | (England) Mansfield Town | 19 August 2020 | |
| 30 June 2020 | DF | (Japan) Maya Yoshida | (Italy) Sampdoria | 1 September 2020 | |
| 30 June 2020 | GK | (England) Jack Rose | (England) Walsall | 3 September 2020 | |
| 30 June 2020 | MF | (England) Harlem Hale | (England) Crystal Palace | 18 September 2020 | |
| 30 June 2020 | FW | (Wales) Christian Norton | (England) Stoke City | 27 October 2020 | |
| 30 June 2020 | FW | (England) Marcus Barnes | (England) Oldham Athletic | 22 January 2021 | |
| 30 June 2020 | GK | (England) Alex Cull | Currently unattached | | |
| 30 June 2020 | DF | (Slovakia) Šimon Kozák | Currently unattached | | |
| 5 October 2020 | FW | (Argentina) Guido Carrillo | (Spain) Elche | 5 October 2020 | |

== Pre-season and friendlies ==
Win Draw Loss Fixtures

| 29 August 2020 Friendly | Southampton | 7–1 | Swansea City | Southampton |
| 13:00 BST | Adams 6'; Redmond 13'; Ings 20' (pen.), 42'; Ward-Prowse 34', 45' (pen.); Bertrand 35' | Report | Fulton 110' | Stadium: St Mary's Stadium; Attendance: Behind closed doors |
Note: Fixture played in four quarters of 30 minutes.

== Competitions ==
=== Overview ===
| Competition | First match | Last match | Starting round | Final position | Record | | | | | | | |
| Competition | First match | Last match | Starting round | Final position | Pld | W | D | L | GF | GA | GD | Win % |
|---|---|---|---|---|---|---|---|---|---|---|---|---|
| Premier League | 12 September 2020 | 23 May 2021 | Matchday 1 | 15th | 38 | 12 | 7 | 19 | 47 | 68 | −21 | 31.58 |
| FA Cup | 19 January 2021 | 18 April 2021 | Third round | Semi-finals | 5 | 4 | 0 | 1 | 8 | 1 | +7 | 80.00 |
| EFL Cup | 16 September 2020 | 16 September 2020 | Third round | Third round | 1 | 0 | 0 | 1 | 0 | 2 | −2 | 0.00 |
| Total | | | | | 44 | 16 | 7 | 21 | 55 | 71 | −16 | 36.36 |

Last updated: 23 May 2021
Source: Competitions

=== Premier League ===
==== League table ====
| Pos | Team | Pld | W | D | L | GF | GA | GD | Pts |
|---|---|---|---|---|---|---|---|---|---|
| 13 | Wolverhampton Wanderers | 38 | 12 | 9 | 17 | 36 | 52 | −16 | 45 |
| 14 | Crystal Palace | 38 | 12 | 8 | 18 | 41 | 66 | −25 | 44 |
| 15 | Southampton | 38 | 12 | 7 | 19 | 47 | 68 | −21 | 43 |
| 16 | Brighton & Hove Albion | 38 | 9 | 14 | 15 | 40 | 46 | −6 | 41 |
| 17 | Burnley | 38 | 10 | 9 | 19 | 33 | 55 | −22 | 39 |

Source: Premier League
Rules for classification: 1) Points; 2) Goal difference; 3) Goals scored; 4) If the champions, relegated teams or qualified teams for UEFA competitions cannot be determined by rules 1 to 3, rules 4.1 to 4.3 are applied – 4.1) Points gained in head-to-head record between such teams; 4.2) Away goals scored in head-to-head record between such teams; 4.3) Play-offs

==== Results summary ====
| Overall | | | | | | | | Home | | | | | | Away | | | | | |
| Pld | W | D | L | GF | GA | GD | Pts | W | D | L | GF | GA | GD | W | D | L | GF | GA | GD |
|---|---|---|---|---|---|---|---|---|---|---|---|---|---|---|---|---|---|---|---|
| 38 | 12 | 7 | 19 | 46 | 69 | −23 | 43 | 8 | 3 | 8 | 27 | 26 | +1 | 4 | 4 | 11 | 19 | 43 | −24 |

Last updated: 23 May 2021.

==== Results by matchday ====
| Matchday | 1 | 2 | 3 | 4 | 5 | 6 | 7 | 8 | 9 | 10 | 11 | 12 | 13 | 14 | 15 | 16 | 17 | 18 | 19 | 20 | 21 | 22 | 23 | 24 | 25 | 26 | 27 | 28 | 29 | 30 | 31 | 32 | 33 | 34 | 35 | 36 | 37 | 38 |
|---|---|---|---|---|---|---|---|---|---|---|---|---|---|---|---|---|---|---|---|---|---|---|---|---|---|---|---|---|---|---|---|---|---|---|---|---|---|---|
| Ground | A | H | A | H | A | H | A | H | A | H | A | H | A | H | A | H | H | A | H | H | A | A | H | H | A | A | A | A | H | H | A | A | H | A | H | H | H | A |
| Result | L | L | W | W | D | W | W | W | D | L | W | W | D | L | D | D | W | L | L | L | L | L | L | D | L | L | W | L | L | W | L | L | D | L | W | W | L | L |
| Position | 14 | 19 | 15 | 11 | 12 | 7 | 5 | 4 | 5 | 6 | 5 | 4 | 3 | 7 | 9 | 9 | 6 | 8 | 11 | 11 | 12 | 12 | 13 | 14 | 14 | 14 | 14 | 14 | 14 | 13 | 14 | 14 | 15 | 17 | 14 | 14 | 14 | 15 |

Updated to match(es) played on 23 May 2021. Source:
A = Away; H = Home; W = Win; D = Draw; L = Loss

==== Matches ====
The 2020–21 season fixtures were released on 20 August.

| 12 September 2020 1 | Crystal Palace | 1–0 | Southampton | Croydon |
| 15:00 BST | Zaha 13' | Report | | Stadium: Selhurst Park; Attendance: Behind closed doors Referee: Jonathan Moss |
Note: Live on BT Sport.

| 20 September 2020 2 | Southampton | 2–5 | Tottenham Hotspur | Southampton |
| 12:00 BST | Ings 32', 90' (pen.) | Report | Son 45+2', 47', 64', 73'; Kane 82' | Stadium: St Mary's Stadium; Attendance: Behind closed doors Referee: David Coote |
Note: Live on BT Sport.

| 26 September 2020 3 | Burnley | 0–1 | Southampton | Burnley |
| 20:00 BST | | Report | Ings 5' | Stadium: Turf Moor; Attendance: Behind closed doors Referee: Andre Marriner |
Note: Live on Sky Sports.

| 4 October 2020 4 | Southampton | 2–0 | West Bromwich Albion | Southampton |
| 12:00 BST | Djenepo 41'; Romeu 69' | Report | | Stadium: St Mary's Stadium; Attendance: Behind closed doors Referee: Chris Kavanagh |
Note: Live on BT Sport.

| 17 October 2020 5 | Chelsea | 3–3 | Southampton | London |
| 15:00 BST | Werner 15', 28'; Havertz 59' | Report | Ings 43'; Adams 57'; Vestergaard 90+2' | Stadium: Stamford Bridge; Attendance: Behind closed doors Referee: Peter Bankes |
Note: Live on BT Sport Box Office.

| 25 October 2020 6 | Southampton | 2–0 | Everton | Southampton |
| 14:00 GMT | Ward-Prowse 27'; Adams 35' | Report | | Stadium: St Mary's Stadium; Attendance: Behind closed doors Referee: Kevin Friend |
Note: Live on Sky Sports.

| 1 November 2020 7 | Aston Villa | 3–4 | Southampton | Birmingham |
| 12:00 GMT | Mings 62'; Watkins 90+3' (pen.); Grealish 90+7' | Report | Vestergaard 20'; Ward-Prowse 33', 45'; Ings 58' | Stadium: Villa Park; Attendance: Behind closed doors Referee: Darren England |
Note: Live on Sky Sports Box Office.

| 6 November 2020 8 | Southampton | 2–0 | Newcastle United | Southampton |
| 20:00 GMT | Adams 7'; Armstrong 82' | Report | | Stadium: St Mary's Stadium; Attendance: Behind closed doors Referee: Peter Bankes |
Note: Live on Sky Sports.

| 23 November 2020 9 | Wolverhampton Wanderers | 1–1 | Southampton | Wolverhampton |
| 20:00 GMT | Neto 75' | Report | Walcott 58' | Stadium: Molineux Stadium; Attendance: Behind closed doors Referee: Andre Marriner |
Note: Live on Sky Sports.

| 29 November 2020 10 | Southampton | 2–3 | Manchester United | Southampton |
| 14:00 GMT | Bednarek 23'; Ward-Prowse 33' | Report | Fernandes 60'; Cavani 74', 90+2' | Stadium: St Mary's Stadium; Attendance: Behind closed doors Referee: Jonathan Moss |
Note: Live on Sky Sports.

| 7 December 2020 11 | Brighton & Hove Albion | 1–2 | Southampton | Brighton |
| 20:00 GMT | Groß 26' (pen.) | Report | Vestergaard 45'; Ings 81' (pen.) | Stadium: Amex Stadium; Attendance: 2,000; Referee: David Coote |
Note: Live on Sky Sports.

| 13 December 2020 12 | Southampton | 3–0 | Sheffield United | Southampton |
| 12:00 GMT | Adams 34'; Armstrong 62'; Redmond 83' | Report | | Stadium: St Mary's Stadium; Attendance: 2,000; Referee: Andrew Madley |
Note: Live on Sky Sports.

| 16 December 2020 13 | Arsenal | 1–1 | Southampton | Holloway |
| 18:00 GMT | Aubameyang 52' | Report | Walcott 18' | Stadium: Emirates Stadium; Attendance: Behind closed doors Referee: Paul Tierney |
Note: Live on Amazon Prime.

| 19 December 2020 14 | Southampton | 0–1 | Manchester City | Southampton |
| 15:00 GMT | | Report | Sterling 16' | Stadium: St Mary's Stadium; Attendance: 2,000; Referee: Mike Dean |
Note: Live on Amazon Prime.

| 26 December 2020 15 | Fulham | 0–0 | Southampton | Fulham |
| 15:00 GMT | | Report | | Stadium: Craven Cottage; Attendance: Behind closed doors Referee: Darren England |
Note: Live on Sky Sports.

| 29 December 2020 16 | Southampton | 0–0 | West Ham United | Southampton |
| 18:00 GMT | | Report | | Stadium: St Mary's Stadium; Attendance: Behind closed doors Referee: Andrew Madley |
Note: Live on Amazon Prime.

| 4 January 2021 17 | Southampton | 1–0 | Liverpool | Southampton |
| 20:00 GMT | Ings 2' | Report | | Stadium: St Mary's Stadium; Attendance: Behind closed doors Referee: Andre Marriner |
Note: Live on Sky Sports.

| 16 January 2021 18 | Leicester City | 2–0 | Southampton | Leicester |
| 20:00 GMT | Maddison 37'; Barnes 90+5' | Report | | Stadium: King Power Stadium; Attendance: Behind closed doors Referee: Stuart Attwell |
Note: Live on BT Sport.

| 26 January 2021 19 | Southampton | 1–3 | Arsenal | Southampton |
| 20:15 GMT | Armstrong 3' | Report | Pépé 8'; Saka 39'; Lacazette 72' | Stadium: St Mary's Stadium; Attendance: Behind closed doors Referee: Kevin Friend |
Note: Live on BT Sport.

| 30 January 2021 20 | Southampton | 0–1 | Aston Villa | Southampton |
| 20:00 GMT | | Report | Barkley 41' | Stadium: St Mary's Stadium; Attendance: Behind closed doors Referee: Lee Mason |
Note: Live on Sky Sports.

| 2 February 2021 21 | Manchester United | 9–0 | Southampton | Manchester |
| 20:15 GMT | Wan-Bissaka 18'; Rashford 25'; Bednarek 34' (o.g.); Cavani 39'; Martial 69', 90'; McTominay 71'; Fernandes 88' (pen.); James 90+3' | Report | | Stadium: Old Trafford; Attendance: Behind closed doors Referee: Mike Dean |
Note: Live on BT Sport.

| 6 February 2021 22 | Newcastle United | 3–2 | Southampton | Newcastle |
| 15:00 GMT | Willock 16'; Almirón 26', 45+4' | Report | Minamino 30'; Ward-Prowse 48' | Stadium: St James' Park; Attendance: Behind closed doors Referee: Craig Pawson |
Note: Live on BT Sport.

| 14 February 2021 23 | Southampton | 1–2 | Wolverhampton Wanderers | Southampton |
| 12:00 GMT | Ings 25' | Report | Neves 53' (pen.); Neto 66' | Stadium: St Mary's Stadium; Attendance: Behind closed doors Referee: Graham Scott |
Note: Live on Amazon Prime.

| 20 February 2021 24 | Southampton | 1–1 | Chelsea | Southampton |
| 12:30 GMT | Minamino 33' | Report | Mount 54' (pen.) | Stadium: St Mary's Stadium; Attendance: Behind closed doors Referee: Anthony Taylor |
Note: Live on BT Sport.

| 23 February 2021 25 | Leeds United | 3–0 | Southampton | Leeds |
| 18:00 GMT | Bamford 47'; Dallas 78'; Raphinha 84' | Report | | Stadium: Elland Road; Attendance: Behind closed doors Referee: Andre Marriner |
Note: Live on Sky Sports.

| 1 March 2021 26 | Everton | 1–0 | Southampton | Liverpool |
| 20:00 GMT | Richarlison 9' | Report | | Stadium: Goodison Park; Attendance: Behind closed doors Referee: Martin Atkinson |
Note: Live on Sky Sports.

| 6 March 2021 27 | Sheffield United | 0–2 | Southampton | Sheffield |
| 15:00 GMT | | Report | Ward-Prowse 32' (pen.); Adams 49' | Stadium: Bramall Lane; Attendance: Behind closed doors Referee: Paul Tierney |
Note: Live on Sky Sports.

| 10 March 2021 28 | Manchester City | 5–2 | Southampton | Manchester |
| 18:00 GMT | De Bruyne 15', 59'; Mahrez 40', 55'; Gündoğan 45+3' | Report | Ward-Prowse 25' (pen.); Adams 56' | Stadium: City of Manchester Stadium; Attendance: Behind closed doors Referee: Jonathan Moss |
Note: Live on Sky Sports.

| 14 March 2021 29 | Southampton | 1–2 | Brighton & Hove Albion | Southampton |
| 12:00 GMT | Adams 27' | Report | Dunk 16'; Trossard 56' | Stadium: St Mary's Stadium; Attendance: Behind closed doors Referee: Stuart Attwell |
Note: Live on BBC One.

| 4 April 2021 30 | Southampton | 3–2 | Burnley | Southampton |
| 12:00 BST | Armstrong 31'; Ings 42'; Redmond 66' | Report | Wood 12' (pen.); Vydra 28' | Stadium: St Mary's Stadium; Attendance: Behind closed doors Referee: Andre Marriner |
Note: Live on Sky Sports.

| 12 April 2021 31 | West Bromwich Albion | 3–0 | Southampton | West Bromwich |
| 18:00 BST | Pereira 32' (pen.); Phillips 35'; Robinson 69' | Report | | Stadium: The Hawthorns; Attendance: Behind closed doors Referee: Simon Hooper |
Note: Live on Sky Sports.

| 21 April 2021 32 | Tottenham Hotspur | 2–1 | Southampton | Tottenham |
| 18:00 BST | Bale 60'; Son 89' (pen.) | Report | Ings 30' | Stadium: Tottenham Hotspur Stadium; Attendance: Behind closed doors Referee: David Coote |
Note: Live on Sky Sports.

| 30 April 2021 33 | Southampton | 1–1 | Leicester City | Southampton |
| 20:00 BST | Ward-Prowse 61' (pen.) | Report | Evans 68' | Stadium: St Mary's Stadium; Attendance: Behind closed doors Referee: Robert Jones |
Note: Live on Sky Sports.

| 8 May 2021 34 | Liverpool | 2–0 | Southampton | Liverpool |
| 20:15 BST | Mané 31'; Thiago 90' | Report | | Stadium: Anfield; Attendance: Behind closed doors Referee: Kevin Friend |
Note: Live on Sky Sports.

| 11 May 2021 35 | Southampton | 3–1 | Crystal Palace | Southampton |
| 20:15 BST | Ings 19', 75'; Adams 48' | Report | Benteke 2' | Stadium: St Mary's Stadium; Attendance: Behind closed doors Referee: Andrew Madley |
Note: Live on Sky Sports.

| 15 May 2021 36 | Southampton | 3–1 | Fulham | Southampton |
| 15:00 BST | Adams 27'; Tella 60'; Walcott 82' | Report | Carvalho 75' | Stadium: St Mary's Stadium; Attendance: Behind closed doors Referee: Craig Pawson |
Note: Live on Sky Sports.

| 18 May 2021 37 | Southampton | 0–2 | Leeds United | Southampton |
| 18:00 BST | | Report | Bamford 73'; Roberts 90+5' | Stadium: St Mary's Stadium; Attendance: 7,291; Referee: Peter Bankes |
Note: Live on Sky Sports.

| 23 May 2021 38 | West Ham United | 3–0 | Southampton | Stratford |
| 16:00 BST | Fornals 30', 33'; Rice 86' | Report | | Stadium: London Stadium; Attendance: 8,000; Referee: Martin Atkinson |

=== FA Cup ===
The third round draw was made on 30 November 2020, with Premier League and EFL Championship all entering the competition. On 7 January 2021, Southampton's third round tie with Shrewsbury Town was postponed following a number of positive COVID-19 tests within the Shrewsbury squad, with the game re-arranged for 19 January. The draw for the fourth and fifth rounds was made, live on BT Sport by Peter Crouch on 11 January. The draw for the quarter finals was made, live on BT Sport by Karen Carney on 11 February. The draw for the semi-finals was made, live on BBC One by Dion Dublin on 21 March.

| 19 January 2021 Third round | Southampton | 2–0 | Shrewsbury Town | Southampton |
| 20:00 GMT | Nlundulu 16'; Ward-Prowse 89' | Report | | Stadium: St Mary's Stadium; Attendance: Behind closed doors Referee: Simon Hooper |
Note: Live on BT Sport.

| 23 January 2021 Fourth round | Southampton | 1–0 | Arsenal | Southampton |
| 12:15 GMT | Gabriel 24' (o.g.) | Report | | Stadium: St Mary's Stadium; Attendance: Behind closed doors Referee: Peter Bankes |
Note: Live on BT Sport.

| 11 February 2021 Fifth round | Wolverhampton Wanderers | 0–2 | Southampton | Wolverhampton |
| 17:30 GMT | | Report | Ings 49'; Armstrong 90' | Stadium: Molineux; Attendance: Behind closed doors Referee: Jonathan Moss |
Note: Live on BT Sport.

| 20 March 2021 Quarter-finals | Bournemouth | 0–3 | Southampton | Bournemouth |
| 12:15 GMT | | Report | Djenepo 37'; Redmond 45+1', 59' | Stadium: Dean Court; Attendance: Behind closed doors Referee: Martin Atkinson |
Note: Live on BT Sport.

| 18 April 2021 Semi-finals | Leicester City | 1–0 | Southampton | London |
| 18:30 BST | Iheanacho 55' | Report | | Stadium: Wembley Stadium; Attendance: Behind closed doors Referee: Chris Kavanagh |
Note: Live on BT Sport.

=== EFL Cup ===
The draw for both the second and third round were confirmed on 6 September, live on Sky Sports by Phil Babb.

| 16 September 2020 Second round | Southampton | 0–2 | Brentford | Southampton |
| 19:45 BST | | Report | Nørgaard 40'; Dasilva 45+1' | Stadium: St Mary's Stadium; Attendance: Behind closed doors Referee: John Brooks |
Note: Live on iFollow.

== Squad statistics ==
As of 18 May 2021

| No. | Pos. | Nat. | Name | League | | | | FA Cup | | | | EFL Cup | | | | Total | | | |
| No. | Pos. | Nat. | Name | Apps. | Goals | Yellow card | Red card | Apps. | Goals | Yellow card | Red card | Apps. | Goals | Yellow card | Red card | Apps. | Goals | Yellow card | Red card |
|---|---|---|---|---|---|---|---|---|---|---|---|---|---|---|---|---|---|---|---|
| 1 | GK | (England) | Alex McCarthy | 30 | 0 | 2 | 0 | 0 | 0 | 0 | 0 | 1 | 0 | 1 | 0 | 31 | 0 | 3 | 0 |
| 2 | DF | (England) | Kyle Walker-Peters | 30 | 0 | 4 | 0 | 4 | 0 | 1 | 0 | 1 | 0 | 0 | 0 | 35 | 0 | 5 | 0 |
| 3 | DF | (England) | Ryan Bertrand | 28 | 0 | 5 | 0 | 4 | 0 | 1 | 0 | 1 | 0 | 0 | 0 | 33 | 0 | 6 | 0 |
| 4 | DF | (Denmark) | Jannik Vestergaard | 29(1) | 3 | 3 | 1 | 2 | 0 | 1 | 0 | 0 | 0 | 0 | 0 | 31(1) | 3 | 4 | 1 |
| 5 | DF | (England) | Jack Stephens | 17(1) | 0 | 2 | 0 | 2(1) | 0 | 1 | 0 | 1 | 0 | 0 | 0 | 20(2) | 0 | 2 | 0 |
| 6 | MF | (Spain) | Oriol Romeu | 20(1) | 1 | 6 | 0 | 1 | 0 | 1 | 0 | 1 | 0 | 0 | 0 | 22(1) | 1 | 7 | 0 |
| 8 | MF | (England) | James Ward-Prowse | 38 | 8 | 5 | 0 | 5 | 1 | 0 | 0 | 1 | 0 | 0 | 0 | 44 | 9 | 5 | 0 |
| 9 | FW | (England) | Danny Ings | 26(3) | 12 | 1 | 0 | 3 | 1 | 0 | 0 | 1 | 0 | 0 | 0 | 30(3) | 13 | 1 | 0 |
| 10 | FW | (Scotland) | Ché Adams | 30(6) | 9 | 1 | 0 | 2(3) | 0 | 0 | 0 | 1 | 0 | 0 | 0 | 33(9) | 9 | 1 | 0 |
| 11 | MF | (England) | Nathan Redmond | 17(12) | 2 | 1 | 0 | 3 | 2 | 0 | 0 | 1 | 0 | 0 | 0 | 21(12) | 4 | 1 | 0 |
| 12 | MF | (Mali) | Moussa Djenepo | 15(12) | 1 | 5 | 0 | 3 | 1 | 0 | 0 | 0(1) | 0 | 0 | 0 | 18(13) | 2 | 5 | 0 |
| 14 | FW | (Republic of Ireland) | Michael Obafemi | 0(4) | 0 | 0 | 0 | 0 | 0 | 0 | 0 | 0(1) | 0 | 0 | 0 | 0(5) | 0 | 0 | 0 |
| 17 | MF | (Scotland) | Stuart Armstrong | 32(1) | 4 | 3 | 0 | 4(1) | 1 | 0 | 0 | 0 | 0 | 0 | 0 | 36(2) | 5 | 3 | 0 |
| 19 | MF | (Japan) | Takumi Minamino | 9(1) | 2 | 1 | 0 | 0 | 0 | 0 | 0 | 0 | 0 | 0 | 0 | 9(1) | 2 | 1 | 0 |
| 20 | MF | (Republic of Ireland) | Will Smallbone | 2(1) | 0 | 0 | 0 | 0 | 0 | 0 | 0 | 0 | 0 | 0 | 0 | 2(1) | 0 | 0 | 0 |
| 22 | DF | (Ghana) | Mohammed Salisu | 8(4) | 0 | 1 | 0 | 1(2) | 0 | 0 | 0 | 0 | 0 | 0 | 0 | 9(6) | 0 | 1 | 0 |
| 23 | MF | (England) | Nathan Tella | 7(11) | 1 | 2 | 0 | 0(3) | 0 | 0 | 0 | 1 | 0 | 0 | 0 | 8(14) | 1 | 2 | 0 |
| 27 | MF | (France) | Ibrahima Diallo | 10(12) | 0 | 3 | 0 | 4 | 0 | 1 | 0 | 0 | 0 | 0 | 0 | 14(12) | 0 | 4 | 0 |
| 31 | DF | (England) | Kayne Ramsay | 1 | 0 | 1 | 0 | 0(1) | 0 | 0 | 0 | 0 | 0 | 0 | 0 | 1(1) | 0 | 1 | 0 |
| 32 | FW | (England) | Theo Walcott | 20(1) | 3 | 0 | 0 | 1(1) | 0 | 0 | 0 | 0 | 0 | 0 | 0 | 21(2) | 3 | 0 | 0 |
| 35 | DF | (Poland) | Jan Bednarek | 36 | 1 | 5 | 1 | 5 | 0 | 2 | 0 | 1 | 0 | 0 | 0 | 42 | 1 | 7 | 1 |
| 40 | FW | (England) | Dan Nlundulu | 0(13) | 0 | 0 | 0 | 1(2) | 1 | 0 | 0 | 0 | 0 | 0 | 0 | 1(15) | 1 | 0 | 0 |
| 41 | GK | (England) | Harry Lewis | 0 | 0 | 0 | 0 | 0 | 0 | 0 | 0 | 0 | 0 | 0 | 0 | 0 | 0 | 0 | 0 |
| 44 | GK | (England) | Fraser Forster | 8 | 0 | 0 | 0 | 5 | 0 | 0 | 0 | 0 | 0 | 0 | 0 | 13 | 0 | 0 | 0 |
| 47 | MF | (Republic of Ireland) | Will Ferry | 0 | 0 | 0 | 0 | 0 | 0 | 0 | 0 | 0 | 0 | 0 | 0 | 0 | 0 | 0 | 0 |
| 52 | MF | (England) | Ryan Finnigan | 0 | 0 | 0 | 0 | 0(1) | 0 | 0 | 0 | 0 | 0 | 0 | 0 | 0(1) | 0 | 0 | 0 |
| 62 | DF | (France) | Allan Tchaptchet | 0(1) | 0 | 0 | 0 | 0 | 0 | 0 | 0 | 0 | 0 | 0 | 0 | 0(1) | 0 | 0 | 0 |
| 64 | MF | (Switzerland) | Alex Jankewitz | 1(1) | 0 | 0 | 1 | 0(1) | 0 | 0 | 0 | 0 | 0 | 0 | 0 | 1(2) | 0 | 0 | 1 |
| 65 | MF | (Australia) | Caleb Watts | 0(3) | 0 | 1 | 0 | 1 | 0 | 0 | 0 | 0 | 0 | 0 | 0 | 1(3) | 0 | 1 | 0 |
| 72 | MF | (England) | Kegs Chauke | 0 | 0 | 0 | 0 | 1 | 0 | 1 | 0 | 0 | 0 | 0 | 0 | 1 | 0 | 1 | 0 |
Players with appearances who ended the season on loan
| 7 | FW | (Republic of Ireland) | Shane Long | 1(10) | 0 | 0 | 0 | 1(1) | 0 | 0 | 0 | 0(1) | 0 | 0 | 0 | 2(12) | 0 | 0 | 0 |
| 18 | DF | (France) | Yan Valery | 1(2) | 0 | 0 | 0 | 1 | 0 | 0 | 0 | 0 | 0 | 0 | 0 | 2(2) | 0 | 0 | 0 |
| 29 | DF | (England) | Jake Vokins | 1 | 0 | 0 | 0 | 1 | 0 | 0 | 0 | 0 | 0 | 0 | 0 | 2 | 0 | 0 | 0 |

=== Most appearances ===
As of 23 May 2021

| # | Pos. | Nat. | Name | League | | FA Cup | | EFL Cup | | Total | | |
| # | Pos. | Nat. | Name | Starts | Subs | Starts | Subs | Starts | Subs | Starts | Subs | Total |
|---|---|---|---|---|---|---|---|---|---|---|---|---|
| 1 | MF | (England) | James Ward-Prowse | 38 | 0 | 5 | 0 | 1 | 0 | 44 | 0 | 44 |
| 2 | DF | (Poland) | Jan Bednarek | 36 | 0 | 5 | 0 | 1 | 0 | 42 | 0 | 42 |
| 2 | FW | (Scotland) | Ché Adams | 30 | 6 | 2 | 3 | 1 | 0 | 33 | 9 | 42 |
| 4 | MF | (Scotland) | Stuart Armstrong | 32 | 1 | 4 | 1 | 0 | 0 | 36 | 2 | 38 |
| 5 | DF | (England) | Kyle Walker-Peters | 30 | 0 | 4 | 0 | 1 | 0 | 35 | 0 | 35 |
| 6 | DF | (England) | Ryan Bertrand | 29 | 0 | 4 | 0 | 1 | 0 | 34 | 0 | 34 |
| 7 | FW | (England) | Danny Ings | 26 | 3 | 3 | 0 | 1 | 0 | 30 | 3 | 33 |
| 7 | MF | (England) | Nathan Redmond | 17 | 12 | 3 | 0 | 1 | 0 | 21 | 12 | 33 |
| 9 | DF | (Denmark) | Jannik Vestergaard | 29 | 1 | 2 | 0 | 0 | 0 | 31 | 1 | 32 |
| 10 | GK | (England) | Alex McCarthy | 30 | 0 | 0 | 0 | 1 | 0 | 31 | 0 | 31 |
| 10 | MF | (Mali) | Moussa Djenepo | 15 | 12 | 3 | 0 | 0 | 1 | 18 | 13 | 31 |

=== Top goalscorers ===
As of 23 May 2021

| # | Pos. | Nat. | Name | League | | FA Cup | | EFL Cup | | Total | | |
| # | Pos. | Nat. | Name | Goals | Apps. | Goals | Apps. | Goals | Apps. | Goals | Apps. | GPG |
|---|---|---|---|---|---|---|---|---|---|---|---|---|
| 1 | FW | (England) | Danny Ings | 12 | 29 | 1 | 3 | 0 | 1 | 13 | 33 | 0.39 |
| 2 | FW | (Scotland) | Ché Adams | 9 | 34 | 0 | 5 | 0 | 1 | 9 | 42 | 0.21 |
| 2 | MF | (England) | James Ward-Prowse | 8 | 38 | 1 | 5 | 0 | 1 | 9 | 44 | 0.20 |
| 4 | MF | (Scotland) | Stuart Armstrong | 4 | 33 | 1 | 5 | 0 | 0 | 5 | 38 | 0.13 |
| 5 | MF | (England) | Nathan Redmond | 2 | 29 | 2 | 3 | 0 | 1 | 4 | 33 | 0.12 |
| 6 | FW | (England) | Theo Walcott | 3 | 21 | 0 | 2 | 0 | 0 | 3 | 23 | 0.13 |
| 6 | DF | (Denmark) | Jannik Vestergaard | 3 | 31 | 0 | 2 | 0 | 0 | 3 | 32 | 0.09 |
| 8 | MF | (Japan) | Takumi Minamino | 2 | 10 | 0 | 0 | 0 | 0 | 2 | 10 | 0.20 |
| 8 | MF | (Mali) | Moussa Djenepo | 1 | 27 | 1 | 3 | 0 | 1 | 2 | 31 | 0.06 |
| 10 | FW | (England) | Dan Nlundulu | 0 | 13 | 1 | 3 | 0 | 1 | 1 | 16 | 0.06 |
| 10 | MF | (England) | Nathan Tella | 1 | 18 | 0 | 3 | 0 | 1 | 1 | 22 | 0.05 |
| 10 | MF | (Spain) | Oriol Romeu | 1 | 21 | 0 | 1 | 0 | 1 | 1 | 23 | 0.04 |
| 10 | DF | (Poland) | Jan Bednarek | 1 | 35 | 0 | 5 | 0 | 1 | 1 | 42 | 0.02 |
