= Manchester United F.C. 9–0 Southampton F.C. =

2021 football match in Manchester, England

Manchester United v Southampton
- The match programme cover
- Event: 2020–21 Premier League
Manchester United	Southampton
9	0
- Date: 2 February 2021
- Venue: Old Trafford, Trafford, Greater Manchester
- Man of the Match: Bruno Fernandes (Manchester United)
- Referee: Mike Dean (Cheshire)
- Attendance: 0 (Note: The match was played behind closed doors due to the COVID-19 pandemic in England.)
- Weather: Overcast; 9 °C (48 °F); 87% humidity

The 2020–21 Premier League football match between Manchester United and Southampton was played at Old Trafford, Greater Manchester, on 2 February 2021. The match finished 9–0 to Manchester United, a joint-record winning margin for a Premier League match, shared with their own 9–0 win at home to Ipswich Town in March 1995, Leicester City's 9–0 away win over Southampton in October 2019 and Liverpool's 9–0 home win against Bournemouth in August 2022.

Seven different players scored for United (excluding Jan Bednarek's own goal), equalling the all-time Premier League record of most goalscorers for the same team in a single match, set when Chelsea beat Aston Villa 8–0 in December 2012. This record was broken on 24 September 2023, when Newcastle United had eight different scorers in an 8–0 win against Sheffield United.

The match is the joint-seventh highest-scoring Premier League match in history.

== Background ==
Manchester United went into the match in second place in the 2020–21 Premier League table on 41 points, three behind rivals Manchester City, albeit having played 21 matches to City's 20. They had lost just once in their last 16 matches, although they had also won only one of their last four; City had overtaken them at the top of the league with a 5–0 win over West Bromwich Albion on 26 January, and United's defeat at home to last-placed Sheffield United the next day gave City a further advantage. United then fell further behind on 30 January, as they could only manage a goalless draw away to rivals Arsenal, while City beat Sheffield United 1–0 at home.

Meanwhile, Southampton went into the match in 11th place, though they had briefly led the Premier League in November, and were still as high as third in mid-December; a run of just one win in eight Premier League matches, including losing their last three, had seen them drop down the table. They had also scored just three goals in those eight matches, having managed 24 in the first 13 games of the season.

The sides had already met once that season, at Southampton's home ground, St Mary's Stadium, on 29 November 2020. Jan Bednarek opened the scoring midway through the first half with a header from a James Ward-Prowse corner, before Ward-Prowse himself scored from a direct free kick 10 minutes later. Bruno Fernandes pulled a goal back for Manchester United just under 15 minutes into the second half, turning home a right-wing cross from Edinson Cavani, who had come on at half-time, before providing the assist for Cavani to head in the equalising goal in the 74th minute. In the second minute of second-half stoppage time, Cavani scored the winner with another header, this time following a cross from the left wing by Marcus Rashford. It was the fourth time in the season that United had come from behind to win.

== Pre-match ==
=== Team selection ===
While Manchester United had a full squad available heading into the match, Southampton were missing several players through injury, including Ibrahima Diallo, Michael Obafemi, Oriol Romeu, Mohammed Salisu, Will Smallbone, Nathan Tella, Jannik Vestergaard, Theo Walcott and Kyle Walker-Peters. Southampton made four changes from their 1–0 loss to Aston Villa three days earlier; in the absence of central midfielders Diallo, Romeu and Smallbone, manager Ralph Hasenhüttl gave a full debut to Swiss 19-year-old Alexandre Jankewitz, who had come on as a late substitute against Aston Villa. Right-back Walker-Peters had not played since Southampton's 1–0 FA Cup fourth round win over Arsenal and was deputised by Kayne Ramsay, as Yan Valery had been loaned to Birmingham City before the transfer deadline the previous day. Their other changes saw Moussa Djenepo and Ché Adams come in for Walcott and Nathan Redmond, who was on the bench. Southampton had seven youth-team players, including youngster Will Ferry on the bench. Manchester United's only change to their starting line-up saw Mason Greenwood come in for Paul Pogba, while Brandon Williams, who had been a candidate to go out on loan during the transfer window, replaced Axel Tuanzebe on the bench.

=== Referee ===
The referee for the match was Mike Dean from Cheshire. He was supported by assistant referees Darren Cann and Ian Hussin, fourth official Lee Mason, and a video assistant referee team of Graham Scott and Stephen Child.

== Match ==
=== Summary ===
In the second minute of the match, Southampton midfielder Alexandre Jankewitz, on his first start for the club, was sent off for a high challenge on Scott McTominay. It was the fourth time that a player had been sent off within the first two minutes of a Premier League game. Now with a man advantage, Manchester United opened the scoring in the 18th minute, when right-back Aaron Wan-Bissaka met a cross from Luke Shaw at the back post. Marcus Rashford doubled United's lead seven minutes later, before forcing an own goal from Jan Bednarek in the 34th minute. Edinson Cavani added a fourth goal for the home side five minutes later, and it could have been 5–0 before half-time when referee Mike Dean awarded a penalty for a foul on Cavani by Kayne Ramsay; however, the decision was overturned by the video assistant referee, who deemed the foul to have taken place outside the penalty area.

At half-time, Manchester United brought on Anthony Martial and Donny van de Beek in place of Cavani and Shaw. Ché Adams thought he had pulled a goal back for Southampton eight minutes into the second half, only to have it ruled narrowly offside by the video assistant referee. The score stayed at 4–0 for much of the second half, before Martial scored his first goal in nine games in the 69th minute. McTominay scored United's sixth with a low shot from outside the penalty area two minutes later. United were eventually awarded a penalty in the 87th minute when Martial was denied a goalscoring opportunity in the penalty area by Bednarek, who was sent off, reducing Southampton to nine men; Bruno Fernandes converted the spot-kick to make the score 7–0. Martial then added United's eighth goal in the 90th minute, the first time he had scored more than once in a game since his hat-trick against Sheffield United in June 2020, before fellow substitute Daniel James, who had come on for Rashford in the second half, completed the 9–0 scoreline in the final minute of second-half stoppage time.

Manchester United's complete dominance was reflected in the expected goals (xG) metric, creating 3.7 xG in comparison to just 0.5 xG from Southampton.

=== Details ===
2 February 2021
20:15 GMT

Manchester United	9–0	Southampton
Wan-Bissaka 18'; Rashford 25'; Bednarek 34' (o.g.); Cavani 39'; Martial 69', 90'; McTominay 71'; Fernandes 87' (pen.); James 90+3'	Report

Old Trafford, Greater Manchester
Attendance: 0
Referee: Mike Dean (Cheshire)

Manchester United	Southampton

GK	1	(Spain) David de Gea
RB	29	(England) Aaron Wan-Bissaka
CB	2	(Sweden) Victor Lindelöf
CB	5	(England) Harry Maguire (c)	(yellow card) 52'
LB	23	(England) Luke Shaw		(substituted off) 45'
CM	39	(Scotland) Scott McTominay
CM	17	(Brazil) Fred
RW	11	(England) Mason Greenwood
AM	18	(Portugal) Bruno Fernandes
LW	10	(England) Marcus Rashford		(substituted off) 60'
CF	7	(Uruguay) Edinson Cavani		(substituted off) 45'
Substitutes:
GK	26	(England) Dean Henderson
DF	3	(Ivory Coast) Eric Bailly
DF	27	(Brazil) Alex Telles
DF	33	(England) Brandon Williams
MF	6	(France) Paul Pogba
MF	21	(Wales) Daniel James		(substituted on) 60'
MF	31	(Serbia) Nemanja Matić
MF	34	(Netherlands) Donny van de Beek	(yellow card) 53'	(substituted on) 45'
FW	9	(France) Anthony Martial		(substituted on) 45'
Manager:
(Norway) Ole Gunnar Solskjær

GK	1	(England) Alex McCarthy
RB	31	(England) Kayne Ramsay	(yellow card) 42'
CB	35	(Poland) Jan Bednarek	(red card) 86'
CB	5	(England) Jack Stephens	(yellow card) 45'
LB	3	(England) Ryan Bertrand
RM	12	(Mali) Moussa Djenepo		(substituted off) 78'
CM	8	(England) James Ward-Prowse (c)
CM	64	(Switzerland) Alexandre Jankewitz	(red card) 2'
LM	17	(Scotland) Stuart Armstrong	(yellow card) 89'
CF	10	(England) Ché Adams
CF	9	(England) Danny Ings		(substituted off) 70'
Substitutes:
GK	41	(England) Harry Lewis
GK	44	(England) Fraser Forster
DF	62	(France) Allan Tchaptchet		(substituted on) 78'
MF	11	(England) Nathan Redmond		(substituted on) 70'
MF	47	(Republic of Ireland) Will Ferry
MF	52	(England) Ryan Finnigan
MF	65	(Australia) Caleb Watts
MF	72	(England) Kegs Chauke
FW	40	(England) Dan Nlundulu
Manager:
(Austria) Ralph Hasenhüttl

Man of the Match:

- Bruno Fernandes (Manchester United)

Assistant referees:
Darren Cann (Norfolk)
Ian Hussin (Merseyside)
Fourth official:
Lee Mason (Lancashire)
Video assistant referee:
Graham Scott (Berks & Bucks)
Assistant video assistant referee:
Stephen Child (Northamptonshire)

Match rules

- 90 minutes
- No extra time or penalties
- Nine named substitutes, of which up to three may be used

=== Statistics ===
Overall
Statistic	Manchester United	Southampton
Goals scored	9	0
Total shots	24	3
Shots on target	14	1
Touches	784	385
Passes	626	215
Tackles	13	20
Clearances	4	30
Ball possession	74.6%	25.4%
Corner kicks	5	3
Fouls conceded	11	6
Offsides	3	2
Yellow cards	2	3
Red cards	0	2

== Aftermath and reaction ==
It was the second time in Premier League history, since the league's inception in 1992, that Manchester United had recorded a 9–0 victory; the first was in March 1995 against Ipswich Town. The next 9–0 scoreline in the league's history also saw Southampton on the losing side, having lost at home to Leicester City in October 2019. Among the three wins, this was the only one without any player scoring a hat-trick. Excluding Bednarek's own goal, Manchester United had seven players on the score sheet, equalling the record for the most players to have scored for the same team in a single match in Premier League history, set by Chelsea in an 8–0 win over Aston Villa in December 2012.

The result moved Manchester United level on points with Manchester City at the top of the Premier League table on 44 points, although City's goal difference was still better by five goals, despite United's winning margin; City also had two games in hand; a 2–0 away win over Burnley the following night restored their three-point advantage at the top of the table. City and United would finish first and second at the end of the season.

After the defeat, Jankewitz was subjected to racist abuse on social media, which Southampton passed on to the Hampshire Constabulary. Southampton appealed the red card issued to Bednarek, which was subsequently rescinded by The Football Association. Southampton also requested that Mike Dean and Lee Mason not officiate their future fixtures.

In August 2022, the result was equalled by Liverpool's 9–0 win over AFC Bournemouth, the fourth match in Premier League history to be won by such a scoreline.
