= Liverpool F.C. 9–0 AFC Bournemouth =

2022 football match in Liverpool, England

Liverpool v Bournemouth
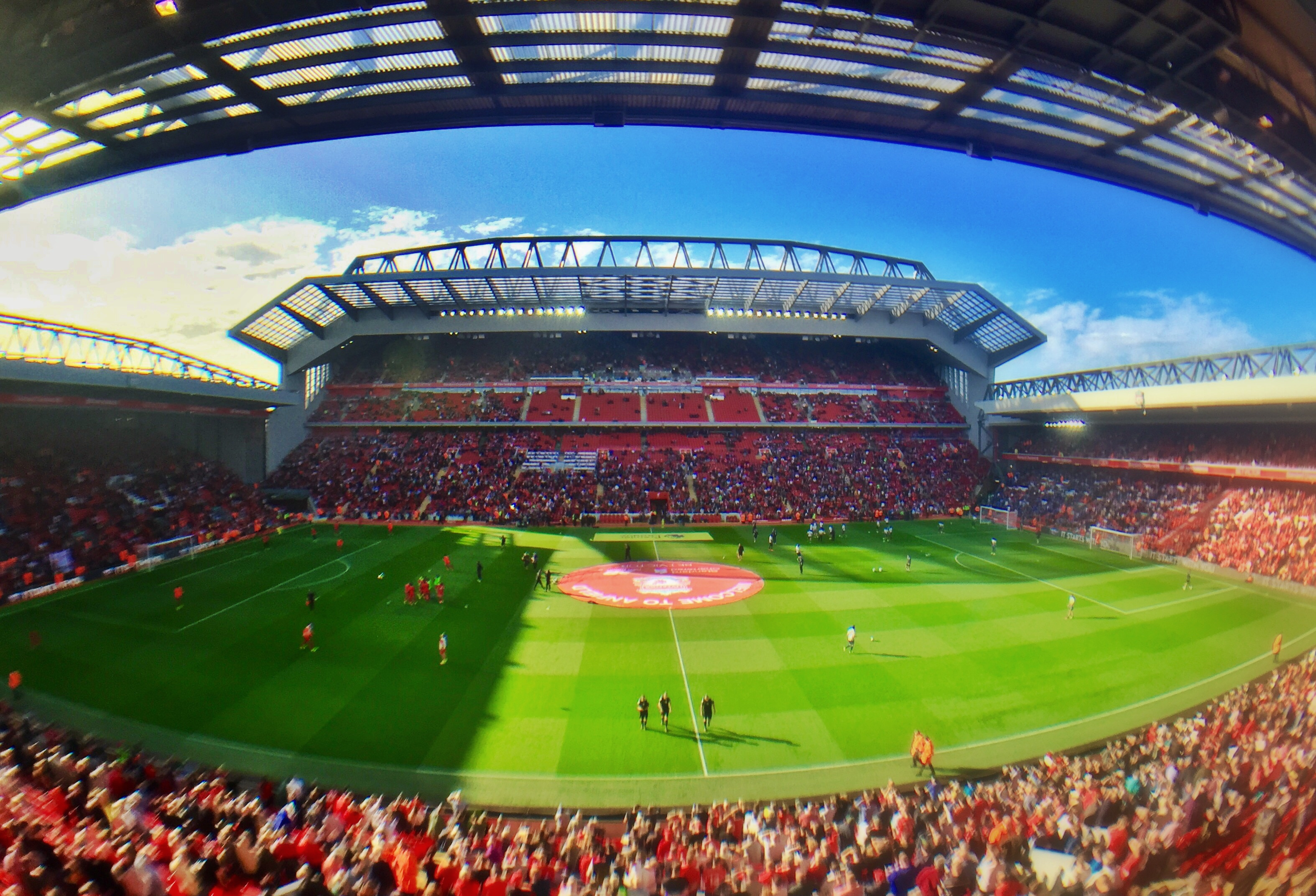
- The match took place at Anfield.
- Event: 2022–23 Premier League
Liverpool	Bournemouth
9	0
- Date: 27 August 2022
- Venue: Anfield, Liverpool
- Man of the Match: Roberto Firmino (Liverpool)
- Referee: Stuart Attwell (Birmingham)
- Attendance: 53,328

The 2022–23 Premier League match between Liverpool and Bournemouth at Anfield, Liverpool, took place on Saturday 27 August 2022. Liverpool won 9–0, which is the joint-largest win in the history of the competition. Previously, the feat had been achieved on three occasions in the Premier League; twice by Manchester United in 1995 and 2021 against Ipswich Town and Southampton respectively, and once by Leicester City in 2019, also against Southampton.

This match equalled Liverpool's biggest win in the top flight. They achieved the same scoreline at Anfield during the 1989–90 season against Crystal Palace. This was also Bournemouth's worst ever top-flight defeat. Bournemouth manager Scott Parker was sacked three days after the match.

== Background ==
Liverpool were runners-up in the 2021–22 Premier League season, but going into Gameweek 4 of the 2022–23 campaign, they were enduring their worst league start under manager Jürgen Klopp. After draws with newly-promoted Fulham and Crystal Palace, they lost away to rivals Manchester United. Meanwhile, Bournemouth were promoted from the EFL Championship in the previous season, and were experiencing a similarly disappointing start, their only victory coming at home to Aston Villa on the opening day.

== Pre-match ==
=== Team selection ===
Liverpool made one change to the starting line-up that lost their previous match away at Manchester United; Brazilian holding midfielder Fabinho was preferred to veteran James Milner. Centre-back Virgil van Dijk made his 200th Premier League appearance, while midfielder Jordan Henderson made 400th in the competition for Liverpool.

Bournemouth made three changes to the team who lost 3–0 at home to then league leaders Arsenal with Lewis Cook, Ryan Christie and Jaidon Anthony all coming into the starting XI.

=== Tributes to Olivia Pratt-Korbel ===
In the ninth minute of the match, a minute's applause was held in tribute to Olivia Pratt-Korbel, a nine-year-old girl from Liverpool who was murdered by a trespasser in her home. This was the first fixture played by Liverpool since the shooting. In a press conference two days before the match, Jürgen Klopp had described the killing as "such a tragedy", before saying, "If we can help, we will". On the day of the match, Klopp wrote in his programme notes: "Nine years old? How can this happen? How is it even possible? I cannot comprehend it and the more I think about it, the more difficult it becomes to understand. That it could happen in a city as special as this one where people look out for one another and stand together makes even less sense. I would like to pass on the sympathies of everyone at Liverpool to Olivia's family. They are in my thoughts and prayers."

After the match, Liverpool captain Jordan Henderson removed his shirt with a vest underneath bearing the slogan: "RIP Olivia YNWA". Later that evening, he tweeted, "That was for Olivia".

== Match ==
=== Summary ===
Liverpool raced into a 2–0 lead within the first six minutes through a Luis Díaz header and long-range effort from Harvey Elliott, the latter getting his first Premier League goal. Further strikes from Trent Alexander-Arnold and Roberto Firmino made it 4–0, before Virgil van Dijk headed in from a corner just before half-time.

Bournemouth defender Chris Mepham scored an own goal within a minute of the second half starting, before Firmino poked in the seventh, in the process reaching 100 goals for the club. Fábio Carvalho volleyed in his first goal for Liverpool before Díaz headed in the ninth with five minutes left.

=== Details ===
27 August 2022
15:00 BST

Liverpool	9–0	Bournemouth
Díaz 3', 85'; Elliott 6'; Alexander-Arnold 28'; Firmino 31', 62'; Van Dijk 45'; Mepham 46' (o.g.); Carvalho 80'	Report

Anfield, Liverpool
Attendance: 53,328
Referee: Stuart Attwell (Birmingham)

Liverpool	Bournemouth

GK	1	(Brazil) Alisson
RB	66	(England) Trent Alexander-Arnold	(substituted off) 83'
CB	2	(England) Joe Gomez
CB	4	(Netherlands) Virgil van Dijk
LB	26	(Scotland) Andy Robertson	(substituted off) 69'
CM	19	(England) Harvey Elliott	(substituted off) 45'
CM	3	(Brazil) Fabinho
CM	14	(England) Jordan Henderson (c)	(substituted off) 70'
RF	11	(Egypt) Mohamed Salah
CF	9	(Brazil) Roberto Firmino	(substituted off) 69'
LF	23	(Colombia) Luis Díaz
Substitutes:
GK	13	(Spain) Adrián
GK	95	(England) Harvey Davies
DF	21	(Greece) Kostas Tsimikas	(substituted on) 69'
DF	43	(Spain) Stefan Bajcetic	(substituted on) 70'
DF	47	(England) Nat Phillips
DF	72	(Netherlands) Sepp van den Berg
MF	7	(England) James Milner	(substituted on) 69'
MF	28	(Portugal) Fábio Carvalho	(substituted on) 45'
FW	42	(England) Bobby Clark	(substituted on) 83'
Manager:
(Germany) Jürgen Klopp

GK	1	(Republic of Ireland) Mark Travers
RB	15	(England) Adam Smith (c)	(yellow card) 35'	(substituted off) 45'
CB	6	(Wales) Chris Mepham		(substituted off) 82'
CB	25	(Argentina) Marcos Senesi
LB	33	(Zimbabwe) Jordan Zemura
CM	4	(England) Lewis Cook		(substituted off) 77'
CM	8	(Colombia) Jefferson Lerma
RW	32	(England) Jaidon Anthony
AM	10	(Scotland) Ryan Christie		(substituted off) 45'
LW	16	(England) Marcus Tavernier
CF	21	(Wales) Kieffer Moore
Substitutes:
GK	13	(Brazil) Neto
DF	17	(England) Jack Stacey
DF	23	(England) James Hill
DF	35	(Wales) Owen Bevan		(substituted on) 82'
MF	11	(Denmark) Emiliano Marcondes			(substituted on) 82'
MF	22	(England) Ben Pearson		(substituted on) 77'	(substituted off) 82'
MF	29	(Denmark) Philip Billing		(substituted on) 45'
FW	9	(England) Dominic Solanke		(substituted on) 45'
FW	38	(England) Christian Saydee
Manager:
(England) Scott Parker

Assistant referees:
Marc Perry (Berks & Bucks)
James Mainwaring (Lancashire)
Fourth official:
Matt Donohue (Manchester)
Video assistant referee:
Craig Pawson (Sheffield & Hallamshire)
Assistant video assistant referee:
Timothy Wood (Gloucestershire)

Match rules

- 90 minutes
- Nine named substitutes
- Maximum of five substitutions (Note: Each team was given only three opportunities to make substitutions, excluding substitutions made at half-time.)

=== Statistics ===
Overall
Statistic	Liverpool	Bournemouth
Goals scored	9	0
Total shots	19	5
Shots on target	12	2
Touches	849	455
Passes	681	303
Tackles	12	20
Clearances	3	17
Ball possession	69.4%	30.6%
Corner kicks	8	1
Fouls conceded	6	5
Offsides	3	0
Yellow cards	0	1
Red cards	0	0

== Aftermath ==
After the match, Bournemouth manager Scott Parker said he was "not surprised" by the result, stating the team was "ill-equipped". He was subsequently sacked by the club on 30 August, with owner Maxim Demin citing the need for "unconditional... [alignment] in our strategy to run the club sustainably", which was interpreted as a reaction to Parker's comments. Parker was replaced as manager by Gary O'Neil on the same day; first on an interim basis, then permanently on 27 November.

The two teams played again in the reverse fixture on 11 March 2023 at the Vitality Stadium. Bournemouth defeated Liverpool 1–0 through a first-half goal by Philip Billing and a missed second-half penalty from Liverpool's Mohamed Salah. The score was seen as a shock, given the earlier result and the teams' respective forms – Liverpool were unbeaten in five after a historic 7–0 win over in-form rivals Manchester United, while Bournemouth began the day at the bottom of the Premier League table.
