= Jan Bednarek =

Polish footballer (born 1996)

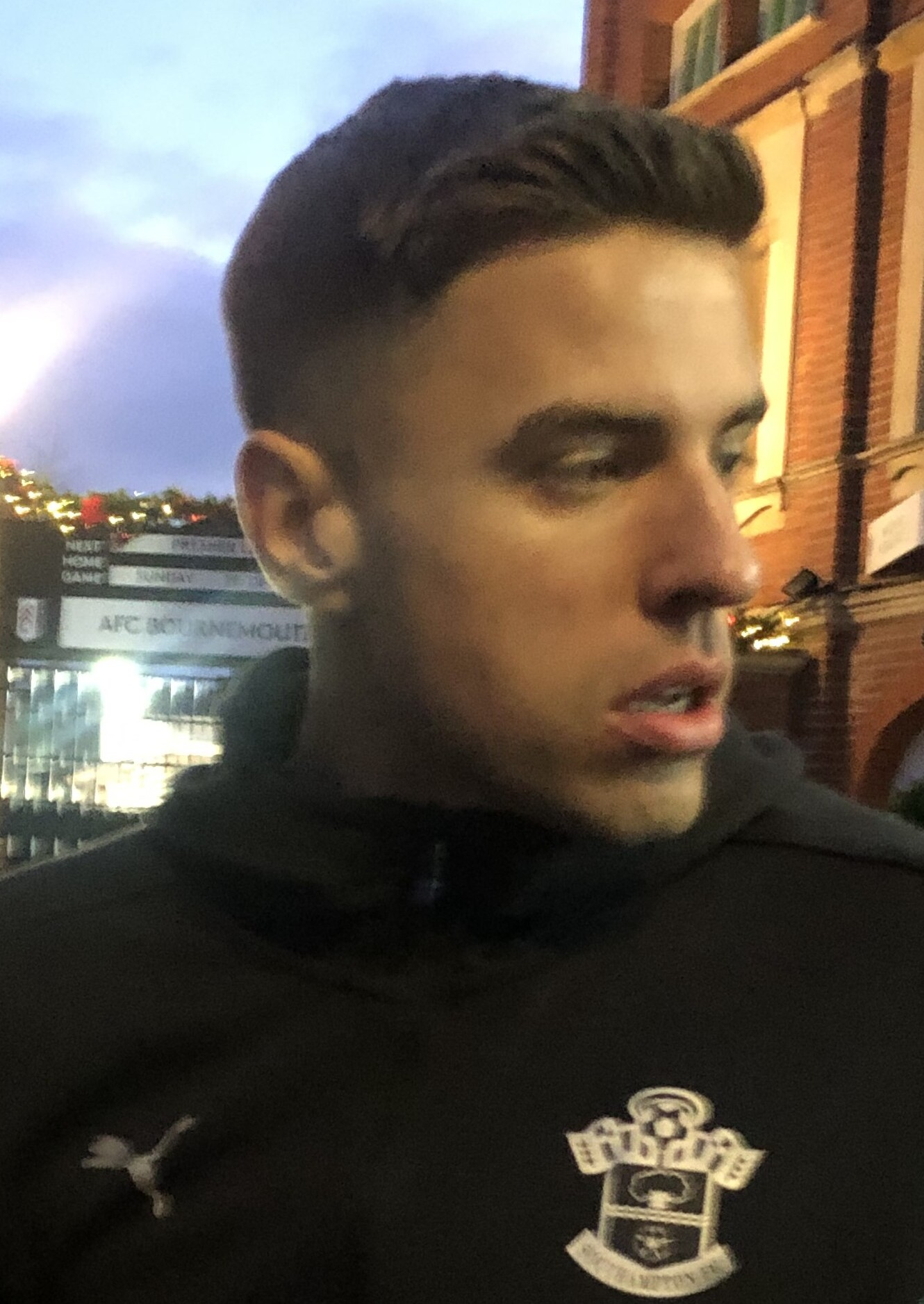
- Bednarek with Southampton in 2024

Personal information
- Full name: Jan Kacper Bednarek
- Date of birth: 12 April 1996 (age 30)
- Place of birth: Słupca, Poland
- Height: 1.89 m (6 ft 2 in)
- Position: Centre-back

Team information
- Current team: Porto
- Number: 5

Youth career
- –2011: Sokół Kleczew
- 2011–2012: MSP Szamotuły
- 2012–2013: Lech Poznań

Senior career*
Years	Team	Apps	(Gls)
2013–2015	Lech Poznań II	20	(2)
2013–2017	Lech Poznań	31	(1)
2015–2016	→ Górnik Łęczna (loan)	17	(0)
2017–2025	Southampton	223	(11)
2022–2023	→ Aston Villa (loan)	3	(0)
2025–	Porto	43	(3)

International career^{‡}
2010	Poland U16	1	(0)
2012–2013	Poland U17	8	(0)
2013–2014	Poland U18	8	(0)
2014–2015	Poland U19	6	(0)
2015–2016	Poland U20	4	(0)
2016–2017	Poland U21	8	(0)
2017–	Poland	80	(2)
- * Club domestic league appearances and goals as of 23:21, 8 November 2026 (UTC) ‡ National team caps and goals as of 23:23, 17 November 2026 (UTC)

Jan Kacper Bednarek (Polish pronunciation: [ˈjan kat͡sˈpɛr bɛdˈnarɛk]; born 12 April 1996) is a Polish professional footballer who plays as a centre-back for Primeira Liga club Porto and the Poland national team.

Bednarek is a product of the Lech Poznań academy and made his professional debut for the club in September 2013. He spent the 2015–16 season on loan at Górnik Łęczna. In July 2017, Bednarek moved to Southampton. He spent the first part of the 2022–23 season on loan at Aston Villa. Bednarek made 254 appearances in all competitions for Southampton before he joined Porto in July 2025. Bednarek has represented Poland at youth and full international level.

== Club career ==
=== Lech Poznań ===
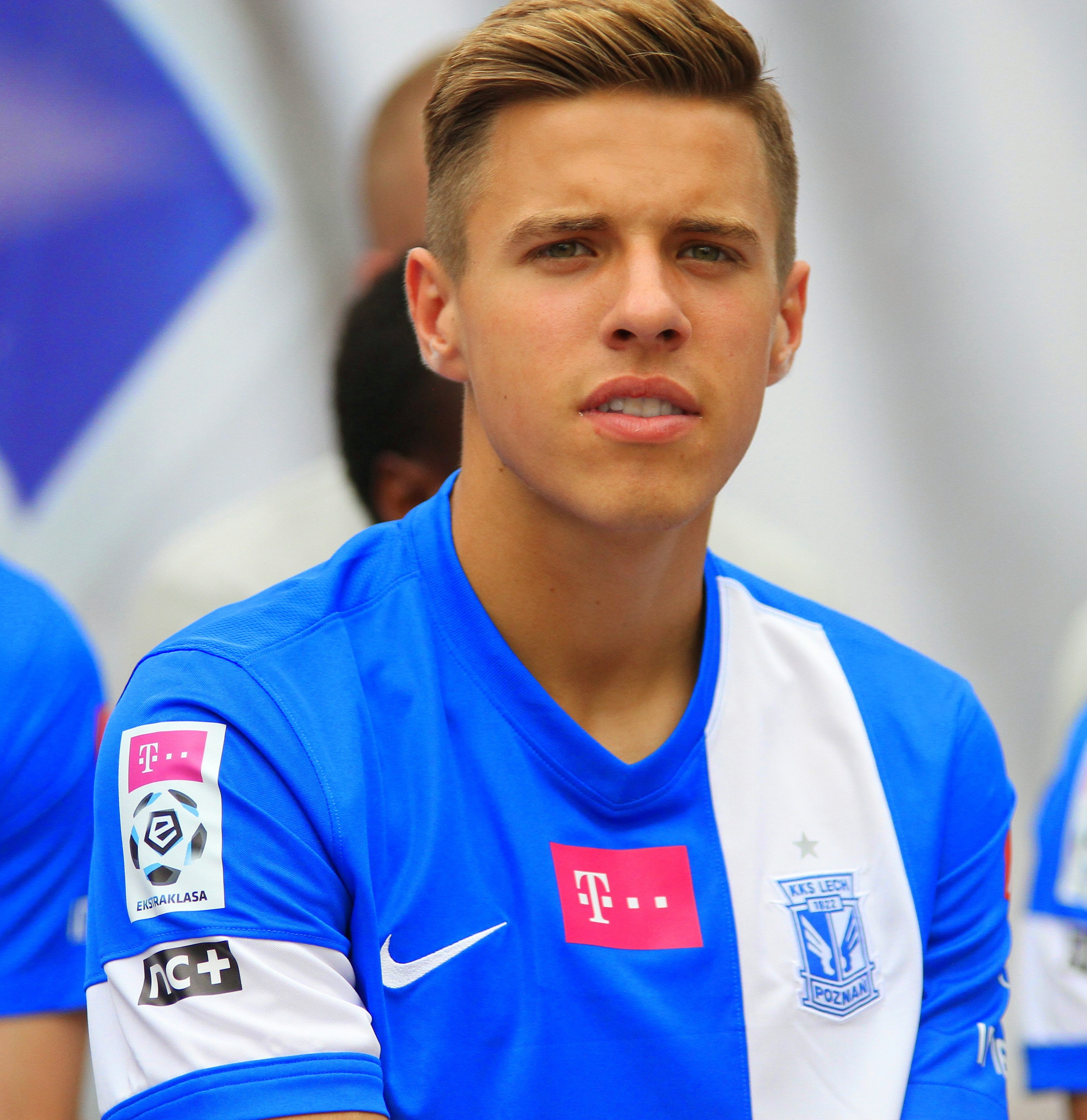
Bednarek with Lech Poznań in 2014

On 23 September 2013, at the age of 17 years old, Bednarek made his Ekstraklasa debut for Lech Poznań in a 2–0 away win against Piast Gliwice.

After sporadic appearances and a loan spell at Górnik Łęczna, he became an integral member of Lech's line-up from the start of the 2016–17 season, featuring 31 times and scoring once as Lech narrowly missed out on the 2016–17 Polish Cup to Arka Gdynia 2–1 after extra time.

==== Górnik Łęczna (loan) ====
He was loaned to Górnik Łęczna for the 2015–16 season. He made his debut for Górnik on 29 August 2015 against Piast Gliwice. While at Górnik, he played a total of 17 league appearances before returning to his parent club.

=== Southampton ===
==== 2017–18 season ====
On 1 July 2017, Bednarek joined Southampton on a five-year deal, for a reported fee of £5 million. On 23 August 2017, he made his debut for Southampton against Wolverhampton Wanderers in the EFL Cup which ended in a 2–0 defeat.

Bednarek did not feature again until 8 January 2018 in a FA Cup match against Fulham which ended in a 1–0 victory before being substituted for Maya Yoshida in the second half. Bednarek played out of position at right-back during the game, but was able to help keep a clean sheet.

Virgil van Dijk left in January, and Mauricio Pellegrino was replaced by Mark Hughes who switched to a back three in April. He made his Premier League debut on 14 April 2018 against Chelsea, and scored Southampton's second goal in a 3–2 defeat. Bednarek ended the season with five league appearances and eight in all competitions.

==== 2018–19 season ====
On 28 August 2018, Bednarek made his first appearance of the season in the EFL Cup against Brighton & Hove Albion which ended in a 1–0 victory. On 22 September 2018, he made his first Premier League appearance of the season against Liverpool which ended in a 3–0 defeat after replacing Oriol Romeu in the second half.

On 3 December 2018, Mark Hughes was sacked by Southampton. Under Hughes, Bednarek only made two league appearances so far that season. The arrival of Ralph Hasenhüttl saw a change in fortune for Bednarek, who ended the season with 25 league appearances.

==== 2019–20 season ====
On 10 August 2019, he made his first appearance of the season in the league in a 3–0 defeat against Burnley. On 25 October 2019, Bednarek featured in Southampton's 0–9 defeat to Leicester City. On 28 January 2020, he scored his first and only goal of the season in a 3–2 defeat to Wolves.

Following Southampton's 1–0 defeat against Newcastle United on 7 March 2020, English football was suspended due to the COVID-19 pandemic. Southampton and Bednarek would not play again until 19 June 2020 against Norwich City which ended in a 3–0 victory. He ended the season with 39 appearances in all competitions.

==== 2020–21 season ====
On 12 September 2020, Bednarek made his first appearance of the season in the league in a 1–0 defeat to Crystal Palace. On 6 November 2020, he featured in Southampton's 2–0 win over Newcastle which saw the Saints go top of the English top flight for the first time since 1988. His only goal of the season came during a 3–2 defeat to Manchester United on 29 November 2020. On 3 December 2020, Bednarek signed a new four-and-a-half-year contract.

On 2 February 2021, Bednarek scored an own goal, conceded a penalty and was given a red card after a foul on Anthony Martial in his team's record-equalling 9–0 defeat to Manchester United after Mike Dean checked the pitchside monitor. Despite this, the red card was controversial and Manchester United manager Ole Gunnar Solskjær believed that Bednarek should not have been sent off. The red card issued was subsequently rescinded following an appeal by the club. He ended the season with 41 appearances in all competitions.

==== 2021–22 season ====
On 22 August 2021, he made his first appearance of the season in a 1–1 draw against Manchester United after replacing Theo Walcott at half time. Three days later, Bednarek made his first start of the season in an 8–0 victory in the EFL Cup against Newport County, which is Southampton's biggest away win in their history. On 18 September 2021, after not starting the opening four games, he made his first league start of the season in a 0–0 draw with Manchester City. In that game, Southampton defender Jack Stephens had played every minute in all competitions up until he suffered a knee injury. Following the injury to Stephens, Bednarek returned to being a regular starter.

On 1 December 2021, he scored his first league goal of the season in a 2–2 draw against Leicester City. On 26 December 2021, Bednarek scored his second goal in three games after he netted the winner in Southampton's 2–3 victory against West Ham. On 11 January 2022, he scored again in Southampton's 4–1 victory against Brentford. On 16 April 2022, Bednarek's final goal of the season came in a 1–0 victory against Arsenal, which took his total goals for the season to four and he ended the season with 34 appearances in all competitions.

==== 2022–23 season: Loan to Aston Villa ====
On 6 August 2022, Bednarek made his first appearance of the season for Southampton in a 4–1 defeat to Tottenham Hotspur. On 1 September 2022, Bednarek joined Aston Villa on a season-long loan. Bednarek made his debut for Aston Villa on 2 October 2022 in a 0–0 draw with Leeds United, replacing the injured Ludwig Augustinsson before half-time.

The loan was ended early on 23 January 2023 as Bednarek was recalled to Southampton after making only four appearances in all competitions for Aston Villa. He made 23 appearances in all competitions throughout the season for Southampton, but the club were relegated to the EFL Championship.

==== 2023–24 season ====
He made his first appearance of the season on 4 August 2023 in a 2–1 away victory against Sheffield Wednesday. On 12 August 2023, Bednarek scored his first goal of the season in a 4–4 draw with Norwich City. Following his fifth yellow card of the campaign during a 1–0 away victory against Millwall, he was suspended for one game. He ended the season with 47 appearances in all competitions.

==== 2024–25 season ====
On 13 September 2024, Bednarek signed a three-year contract extension. He scored his first goal of the season on 19 January 2025 in a 3–2 defeat against Nottingham Forest. On 8 March 2025, Bednarek was substituted within 20 minutes during a 3–1 defeat against Liverpool due to a clash of heads with Ryan Manning. Despite this, manager Ivan Jurić expected him to be available for the next game against Wolverhampton Wanderers. However, he was subsequently ruled out of the match. Bednarek ended the season with 34 appearances in all competitions.

=== Porto ===
On 28 July 2025, after eight seasons with Southampton, Bednarek joined Primeira Liga club Porto on a four-year contract. The Portuguese side paid a €7.5 million transfer fee, with his release clause being set at €60 million. Bednarek began the 2025–26 season as a starter, making his debut on 11 August in a 3–0 league victory over Vitória de Guimarães at the Estádio do Dragão. On 25 September, he made his debut in European competitions, starting in a 1–0 away win against Red Bull Salzburg in the league phase of the UEFA Europa League.

On 18 October, Bednarek scored his first goal for Porto, netting the opener in a 4–0 win over Celoricense in the 3rd round of the Taça de Portugal. On 14 January 2026, in the quarter-finals of that same competition, Bednarek scored the only goal of the match in a 1–0 home victory over rivals Benfica. Later that year, on 2 May, he scored the only goal in a 1–0 victory over Alverca, securing his club's Primeira Liga title.

== International career ==
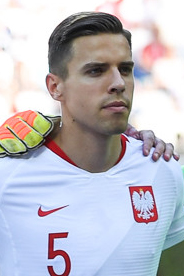
Bednarek lining up for Poland at the 2018 FIFA World Cup

On 4 September 2017, Bednarek made his international debut for Poland in a 3–0 victory over Kazakhstan.

In May 2018, he was named in Poland's preliminary 35-man squad for the 2018 World Cup in Russia. On 28 June 2018, he scored his first goal for Poland, the only goal in a 1–0 victory over Japan.

In May 2021, Bednarek was named in the Poland squad for the delayed UEFA Euro 2020. Following a 3–2 defeat to Sweden, Poland subsequently finished bottom of Group E.

In November 2022, he was named in the Poland squad for the 2022 World Cup in Qatar. On 7 June 2024, Bednarek was selected by coach Michał Probierz for UEFA Euro 2024.

== Personal life ==
His brother Filip is also a footballer, who currently plays as a goalkeeper for the Dutch club Sparta Rotterdam.

In November 2022, Bednarek opened up on mental health struggles while at Southampton which led to him leaving the club on loan to Aston Villa during the 2022–23 season.

== Career statistics ==
=== Club ===
As of match played 20 November 2026

Appearances and goals by club, season and competition
Club	Season	League			National cup (Note: Includes Polish Cup, FA Cup, Taça de Portugal)		League cup (Note: Includes EFL Cup, Taça da Liga)		Europe		Other		Total	
Club	Season	Division	Apps	Goals	Apps	Goals	Apps	Goals	Apps	Goals	Apps	Goals	Apps	Goals
Lech Poznań II	2013–14	III liga, gr. C	14	2	—		—		—		—		14	2
Lech Poznań II	2014–15	III liga, gr. C	6	0	—		—		—		—		6	0
Lech Poznań II	Total		20	2	—		—		—		—		20	2
Lech Poznań	2013–14	Ekstraklasa	2	0	0	0	—		0	0	—		2	0
Lech Poznań	2014–15	Ekstraklasa	2	0	2	0	—		0	0	—		4	0
Lech Poznań	2016–17	Ekstraklasa	27	1	7	0	—		—		0	0	34	1
Lech Poznań	Total		31	1	9	0	—		0	0	0	0	40	1
Górnik Łęczna (loan)	2015–16	Ekstraklasa	17	0	1	0	—		—		—		18	0
Southampton	2017–18	Premier League	5	1	2	0	1	0	—		—		8	1
Southampton	2018–19	Premier League	25	0	0	0	2	0	—		—		27	0
Southampton	2019–20	Premier League	34	1	2	0	3	0	—		—		39	1
Southampton	2020–21	Premier League	36	1	5	0	1	0	—		—		42	1
Southampton	2021–22	Premier League	31	4	1	0	2	0	—		—		34	4
Southampton	2022–23	Premier League	20	0	—		3	0	—		—		23	0
Southampton	2023–24	Championship	42	2	2	0	0	0	—		3 (Note: Appearances in Championship play-offs)	0	47	2
Southampton	2024–25	Premier League	30	2	2	0	2	0	—		—		34	2
Southampton	Total		223	11	14	0	14	0	—		3	0	254	11
Aston Villa (loan)	2022–23	Premier League	3	0	1	0	0	0	—		—		4	0
Porto	2025–26	Primeira Liga	32	2	5	2	0	0	12 (Note: Appearances in UEFA Europa League)	0	—		49	4
Porto	2026–27	Primeira Liga	11	1	1	0	1	0	2 (Note: Appearances in UEFA Champions League)	1	1 (Note: Appearance in Supertaça Cândido de Oliveira)	0	16	2
Porto	Total		43	3	6	2	1	0	14	1	1	0	65	6
Career total			335	17	31	2	15	0	14	1	4	0	399	20

=== International ===
As of match played 17 November 2026

Appearances and goals by national team and year
National team	Year	Apps	Goals
Poland	2017	1	0
Poland	2018	11	1
Poland	2019	9	0
Poland	2020	6	0
Poland	2021	10	0
Poland	2022	9	0
Poland	2023	8	0
Poland	2024	11	0
Poland	2025	7	0
Poland	2026	8	1
Total		80	2

As of match played 2 October 2026
Poland score listed first, score column indicates score after each Bednarek goal.

List of international goals scored by Jan Bednarek
No.	Date	Venue	Opponent	Score	Result	Competition	Ref.
1	28 June 2018	Volgograd Arena, Volgograd, Russia	Japan	1–0	1–0	2018 FIFA World Cup	
2	2 October 2026	Stadion Narodowy, Warsaw, Poland	Romania	5–0	6–0	2026–27 UEFA Nations League B	

== Honours ==
Lech Poznań

- Ekstraklasa: 2014–15

Southampton

- EFL Championship play-offs: 2024

Porto

- Primeira Liga: 2025–26
- Supertaça Cândido de Oliveira: 2026

Individual

- Polish Newcomer of the Year: 2016
- Primeira Liga Defender of the Month: September/October 2025, November 2025, December 2025, February 2026, April 2026
- Primeira Liga Team of the Season: 2025–26
