= Alexandre Jankewitz =

Swiss footballer (born 2001)

Personal information
- Full name: Alexandre Tounde Dimitri Jankewitz
- Date of birth: 25 December 2001 (age 24)
- Place of birth: Vevey, Switzerland
- Height: 1.81 m (5 ft 11 in)
- Position: Midfielder

Team information
- Current team: Winterthur
- Number: 45

Youth career
- –2018: Servette
- 2018–2021: Southampton

Senior career*
Years	Team	Apps	(Gls)
2021	Southampton	2	(0)
2021–2024	Young Boys	6	(0)
2022	→ St. Gallen (loan)	16	(0)
2022–2023	→ Thun (loan)	26	(1)
2023–2024	→ Winterthur (loan)	18	(0)
2024–	Winterthur	54	(2)

International career^{‡}
2015–2016	Switzerland U15	5	(1)
2016–2017	Switzerland U16	4	(0)
2017–2018	Switzerland U17	11	(0)
2018–2019	Switzerland U18	4	(1)
2019	Switzerland U19	6	(0)
2020–	Switzerland U21	20	(1)
- * Club domestic league appearances and goals as of 06:51, 17 November 2026 (UTC) ‡ National team caps and goals as of 24 September 2022

Alexandre Tounde Dimitri Jankewitz (born 25 December 2001) is a Swiss professional footballer who plays as a midfielder for Swiss Challenge League club Winterthur.

== Club career ==
=== Southampton ===
Jankewitz signed his first professional contract in July 2019. On 19 January 2021, he made his first professional appearance for Saints in a 2–0 home victory over Shrewsbury Town in the FA Cup. On 30 January 2021, Jankewitz made his Premier League debut as a substitute for Oriol Romeu in a 1–0 home defeat by Aston Villa.

On 2 February 2021, he was sent off on his first Premier League start within the first two minutes of the away game against Manchester United, for a dangerous tackle on Scott McTominay. Southampton went on to lose the match by a record-equalling score of 9–0. After the defeat, Jankewitz was subjected to racist abuse on social media, which Southampton passed on to Hampshire Police.

=== Young Boys ===
On 12 July 2021, Jankewitz joined BSC Young Boys for an undisclosed fee.

==== Loan to St. Gallen ====
In January 2022, he joined St. Gallen on loan until the end of the season.

==== Return to Young Boys and loan to Thun ====
After returning to Young Boys, Jankewitz made several substitute league appearances and was a starter in three Conference League qualifying games. After Young Boys failed to qualify for the group stage of the competition, on 30 August 2022 Jankewitz moved to Thun on loan.

=== Winterthur ===
On 8 June 2023, he joined FC Winterthur for another loan spell. On 14 August 2024, Jankewitz joined the club permanently on a three-year contract.

== International career ==
Born in Switzerland, Jankewitz is of Cameroonian descent. He is a youth international for Switzerland.

== Career statistics ==
=== Club ===
As of match played 7 November 2026

Appearances and goals by club, season and competition
Club	Season	League			National cup (Note: Includes FA Cup, Swiss Cup)		League cup (Note: Includes EFL Cup)		Other		Total	
Club	Season	Division	Apps	Goals	Apps	Goals	Apps	Goals	Apps	Goals	Apps	Goals
Southampton	2020–21	Premier League	2	0	1	0	0	0	0	0	3	0
Young Boys	2021–22	Swiss Super League	3	0	1	0	—		0	0	4	0
Young Boys	2022–23	Swiss Super League	3	0	1	1	—		4 (Note: Appearances in UEFA Conference League)	0	8	1
Young Boys	2023–24	Swiss Super League	0	0	0	0	—		0	0	0	0
Young Boys	Total		6	0	2	1	—		4	0	12	1
St Gallen (loan)	2021–22	Swiss Super League	16	0	1	1	—		0	0	17	1
Thun (loan)	2022–23	Swiss Challenge League	26	1	3	0	—		0	0	29	1
Winterthur (loan)	2023–24	Swiss Super League	18	0	2	0	—		0	0	20	0
Winterthur	2024–25	Swiss Super League	10	0	0	0	—		0	0	10	0
Winterthur	2025–26	Swiss Super League	32	2	2	0	—		0	0	34	2
Winterthur	2026–27	Swiss Challenge League	12	0	0	0	—		0	0	12	0
Winterthur	Total		54	2	2	0	—		0	0	56	2
Career total			122	3	11	2	0	0	4	0	137	5
