= Jannik Vestergaard =

Danish footballer (born 1992)

- Vestergaard with Leicester City in 2025

Personal information
- Full name: Jannik Vestergaard
- Date of birth: 3 August 1992 (age 34)
- Place of birth: Hvidovre, Denmark
- Height: 1.99 m (6 ft 6 in)
- Position: Centre-back

Youth career
- Vestia
- Frem
- Copenhagen
- Brøndby

Senior career*
Years	Team	Apps	(Gls)
2010–2011	TSG Hoffenheim II	22	(4)
2011–2015	TSG Hoffenheim	71	(4)
2015–2016	Werder Bremen	48	(3)
2016–2018	Borussia Mönchengladbach	66	(7)
2018–2021	Southampton	72	(4)
2021–2026	Leicester City	101	(5)
Total		380	(27)

International career
2010	Denmark U18	4	(1)
2010–2011	Denmark U19	7	(0)
2011	Denmark U20	2	(0)
2011–2015	Denmark U21	28	(4)
2013–2025	Denmark	59	(3)
- * Club domestic league appearances and goals

Jannik Vestergaard (born 3 August 1992) is a Danish former professional footballer who played as a centre-back.

Vestergaard played for various Danish and German clubs, before joining Southampton in 2018. After moving to fellow English side Leicester City in 2021, he won promotion to the Premier League with the club in the 2023–24 season. After spending five seasons with Leicester, he left the club in July 2026.

At international level, Vestergaard represented Denmark at various youth levels, before debuting for the senior side in 2013. He was included in the Danish squads for two UEFA European Championships (2020 and 2024) and one FIFA World Cup (2018), earning 59 appearances in total.

== Early and personal life ==
Vestergaard was born to a Danish father and a German mother in the Copenhagen suburb of Hvidovre and grew up in Copenhagen.

His German grandfather Hannes Schröers and uncle Jan Schröers were also footballers for Fortuna Düsseldorf and Bayer 05 Uerdingen respectively. His cousin Mika Schröers played for Borussia Mönchengladbach's youth teams in 2016.

He has a girlfriend, Pernille, and a dog, Brady.

== Club career ==
=== Early career ===
Vestergaard played youth football with Vestia, Boldklubben Frem, Kjøbenhavns Boldklub and Brøndby.

=== TSG Hoffenheim ===
In 2010, Vestergaard left Denmark to sign for German Bundesliga club TSG Hoffenheim. He would make his professional debut as a substitute for Ryan Babel in a Bundesliga fixture against Eintracht Frankfurt on 16 April 2011.

Vestergaard became an established starter for Hoffenheim during the 2011–12 season, scoring his first goal for the club in a 1–1 draw with Werder Bremen on 11 February 2012.

=== Werder Bremen ===
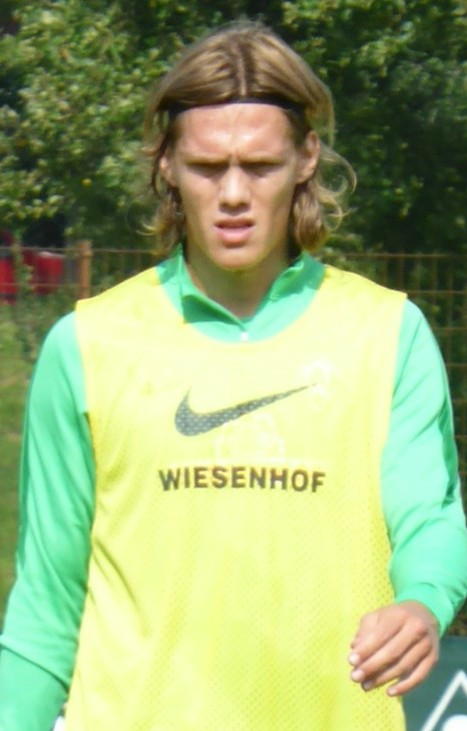
Vestergaard training with Werder Bremen in 2015

After four seasons at Hoffenheim, he moved to Werder Bremen in January 2015. He made his debut for Bremen in a 2–0 win over Hertha BSC on 1 February.

=== Borussia Mönchengladbach ===
On 11 June 2016, Vestergaard joined Borussia Mönchengladbach for a reported transfer of €12 million plus bonuses. During his first season at Borussia, Vestergaard made his UEFA Champions League debut.

=== Southampton ===
Vestergaard moved to English club Southampton on 13 July 2018, signing a four-year contract. On 12 August, he made his debut in a 0–0 draw against Burnley in the Premier League.

He scored his first goal for the club on 31 August 2019, the equaliser in a 1–1 draw against Manchester United. On 25 October, Vestegaard featured in Southampton's 9–0 home defeat against Leicester City.

During a 1–1 draw with Leicester City on 30 April 2021, Vestegaard received a red card after referee Rob Jones deemed his follow-through on Jamie Vardy denied a goal scoring opportunity. Manager Ralph Hasenhüttl described the red card as "simply wrong" and that it would be appealed. The red card was subsequently rescinded following an appeal from the club.

=== Leicester City ===
On 12 August 2021, it was announced that Southampton had accepted a transfer offer from Leicester City for Vestergaard. On 13 August, he officially signed for Leicester on a three-year contract, for an undisclosed fee. He made his debut for the club the following day in the opening weekend of the Premier League as a 62nd-minute substitute in a 1–0 win against Wolverhampton Wanderers.

After making 19 appearances during his first season at Leicester, Vestergaard did not appear at all during the 2022–23 season, as the club was relegated from the Premier League. He was demoted to the reserves in March 2023 after giving an interview critical of manager Brendan Rodgers; Rodgers was sacked by the club a month later after a poor run of results left Leicester in the relegation zone, and Vestergaard would be reconsidered as a member of the team.

Following their first season back in the EFL Championship, Vestergaard established himself as a starting central defender for Leicester in their 2023–24 season under new manager Enzo Maresca. On 6 August 2023, he started Leicester's opening match of the Championship, a 2–1 home win over Coventry City. On 21 October, he scored his first goal for the club in a 3–1 away win at Swansea City. On 7 June 2024, he extended his contract with the club until 2027.

On 16 July 2026, it was announced that Leicester had terminated Vestergaard's contract by mutual agreement.

Vestergaard announced his retirement from professional football on 2 October 2026, citing a lack of motivation to continue playing.

== International career ==
Besides Denmark, Vestergaard was also eligible to represent Germany through his German mother. Vestergaard represented the Denmark national youth teams at under-18, under-19, under-20 and under-21 levels.

He received his first call-up to the Denmark senior team in August 2013, describing it as his "dream" to play for the country, and he made his debut later that month in a match against Poland. His first goal for Denmark came in his first competitive game, against Sweden in the European Championship play-off return leg on 17 November 2015.

He represented the Denmark U21 team at the 2015 UEFA European Under-21 Championship in the Czech Republic, and scored in a 2–1 defeat of the host nation in the opening match at the Eden Arena in Prague.

Vestergaard was a member of Denmark's squad at the 2018 FIFA World Cup in Russia, but did not make any appearances in the tournament.

In June 2021, Vestergaard was included in the 26-man Denmark squad for UEFA Euro 2020, where the team reached the semi-finals.

Following Denmark's failure to qualify for the 2026 FIFA World Cup, Vestergaard announced his retirement from international football on 17 April 2026.

== Career statistics ==
=== Club ===
Appearances and goals by club, season and competition
Club	Season	League			National cup (Note: Includes DFB-Pokal, FA Cup)		League cup (Note: Includes EFL Cup)		Europe		Other		Total	
Club	Season	Division	Apps	Goals	Apps	Goals	Apps	Goals	Apps	Goals	Apps	Goals	Apps	Goals
TSG Hoffenheim	2010–11	Bundesliga	1	0	0	0	—		—		—		1	0
TSG Hoffenheim	2011–12	Bundesliga	23	2	3	0	—		—		—		26	2
TSG Hoffenheim	2012–13	Bundesliga	16	0	1	0	—		—		2 (Note: Appearances in Bundesliga relegation play-offs)	0	19	0
TSG Hoffenheim	2013–14	Bundesliga	25	1	4	0	—		—		—		29	1
TSG Hoffenheim	2014–15	Bundesliga	6	1	1	1	—		—		—		7	2
TSG Hoffenheim	Total		71	4	9	1	—		—		2	0	82	5
Werder Bremen	2014–15	Bundesliga	15	1	1	0	—		—		—		16	1
Werder Bremen	2015–16	Bundesliga	33	2	5	1	—		—		—		38	3
Werder Bremen	Total		48	3	6	1	—		—		—		54	4
Borussia Mönchengladbach	2016–17	Bundesliga	34	4	5	0	—		10 (Note: Six appearances in UEFA Champions League, four appearances in UEFA Europa League)	0	—		49	4
Borussia Mönchengladbach	2017–18	Bundesliga	32	3	2	0	—		—		—		34	3
Borussia Mönchengladbach	Total		66	7	7	0	—		10	0	—		83	7
Southampton	2018–19	Premier League	23	0	2	0	1	0	—		—		26	0
Southampton	2019–20	Premier League	19	1	2	0	0	0	—		—		21	1
Southampton	2020–21	Premier League	30	3	2	0	0	0	—		—		32	3
Southampton	Total		72	4	6	0	1	0	—		—		79	4
Leicester City	2021–22	Premier League	10	0	1	0	3	0	6 (Note: Three appearances in UEFA Europa League, three appearances in UEFA Europa Conference League)	0	—		20	0
Leicester City	2022–23	Premier League	0	0	1	0	2	0	—		—		3	0
Leicester City	2023–24	Championship	42	2	2	0	0	0	—		—		44	2
Leicester City	2024–25	Premier League	18	0	0	0	1	0	—		—		19	0
Leicester City	2025–26	Championship	31	3	1	0	0	0	—		—		32	3
Leicester City	Total		101	5	5	0	6	0	6	0	—		118	5
Career total			358	23	33	2	7	0	16	0	2	0	416	25

=== International ===
Appearances and goals by national team and year
National team	Year	Apps	Goals
Denmark	2013	1	0
Denmark	2014	1	0
Denmark	2015	3	1
Denmark	2016	7	0
Denmark	2017	3	0
Denmark	2018	2	0
Denmark	2019	0	0
Denmark	2020	3	0
Denmark	2021	11	0
Denmark	2022	4	1
Denmark	2023	2	0
Denmark	2024	14	1
Denmark	2025	8	0
Total		59	3

Scores and results list Denmark's goal tally first, score column indicates score after each Vestergaard goal.

List of international goals scored by Jannik Vestergaard
No.	Date	Venue	Opponent	Score	Result	Competition
1	17 November 2015	Parken Stadium, Copenhagen, Denmark	Sweden	2–2	2–2	UEFA Euro 2016 qualifying
2	26 March 2022	Johan Cruyff Arena, Amsterdam, Netherlands	Netherlands	1–1	2–4	Friendly
3	8 June 2024	Brøndby Stadium, Brøndbyvester, Denmark	Norway	2–0	3–1	Friendly

== Honours ==
Leicester City

- EFL Championship: 2023–24

Individual

- PFA Team of the Year: 2023–24 Championship
