= Manchester United F.C. 9–0 Ipswich Town F.C. =

1995 football match in Greater Manchester, England

Manchester United v Ipswich Town
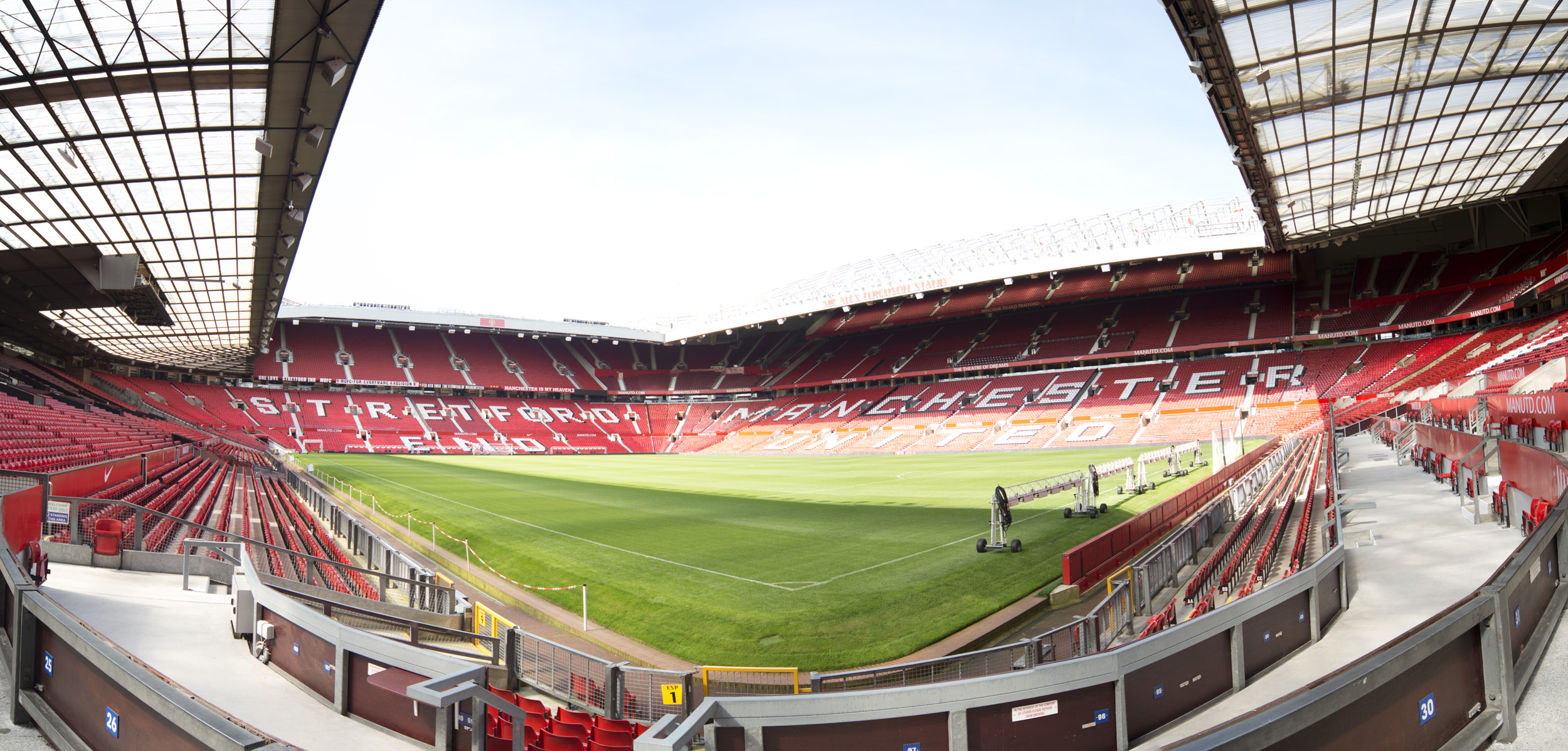
- The match took place at Old Trafford.
- Event: 1994–95 FA Premier League
Manchester United	Ipswich Town
9	0
- Date: 4 March 1995
- Venue: Old Trafford, Trafford, Greater Manchester
- Referee: Graham Poll (Tilehurst)
- Attendance: 43,804

The football match between Manchester United and Ipswich Town played at Old Trafford, Greater Manchester, on 4 March 1995 as part of the 1994–95 FA Premier League finished in a 9–0 victory for the home team. The result is the biggest winning margin in the Premier League, which was later matched when Southampton subsequently lost by the same scoreline at home to Leicester City in 2019 and away at Manchester United in 2021, while Bournemouth also lost 9–0 to Liverpool in 2022. The two teams went into the match at opposite ends of the table; Manchester United were second, while Ipswich Town were second-last. In the corresponding fixture at Ipswich's Portman Road ground earlier in the season, they had beaten United 3–2. Manchester United were missing Eric Cantona, their French international forward who was serving a nine-month suspension, and their attacking partnership of Andy Cole and Mark Hughes was not well regarded by pundits.

Playing in front of the highest attendance in the league to that point in the season, United scored three times in the first half; Roy Keane opened the scoring, before Cole added two more. In the second half, United scored four times in the first twenty minutes; Cole scored his third and fourth, while Hughes also scored two. Paul Ince scored United's eighth with a free kick into an empty net while Ipswich's goalkeeper Craig Forrest argued with the referee, before Cole scored a Premier League-record fifth goal, United's ninth, in the 89th minute. Ipswich finished the season in last place and were relegated by 18 points, while Manchester United finished second behind champions Blackburn Rovers. Despite the record score at Old Trafford, Ipswich's victory at Portman Road proved to be the more significant result with regard to the final placings, as Manchester United missed out on the title by a single point.

== Background ==
Manchester United were the reigning Premier League champions, having won the 1993–94 title by eight points ahead of Blackburn Rovers, and also winning the inaugural Premier League title a year earlier and lifting a major trophy for five consecutive seasons, having won cup competitions for three successive seasons from 1990. However, they had been knocked out of the 1994–95 UEFA Champions League in the group stage, and were trailing Blackburn by three points at the top of the table going into this match. In response to their elimination from European competition, and their need for a goal-scorer, they signed Andy Cole from Newcastle United for a British record fee of £7 million in January 1995. (Note: The transfer for Cole was £6 million, plus the £1 million-rated Keith Gillespie.)

Ipswich Town had returned to the top flight of English football in time for the start of the Premier League in the 1992–93 season; however, they had finished in the bottom half of the table in both of the new league's first two seasons and had narrowly avoided relegation to Division One in the final minutes of the 1993–94 campaign, finishing one point above the relegation zone after failing to win a league game during the final three months of the season. Coming into this match, Ipswich were in 21st place in the league, three points and a game ahead of bottom club Leicester City, but eight points away from escaping the relegation zone.

Before this match, the two teams had met 50 times in all competitions; Manchester United had the upper hand with 24 wins to Ipswich's 18. The remaining eight matches, which finished as draws, were all in the league, where it was a similar story, with Manchester United winning 20 of the teams' 45 meetings, while Ipswich had 17 wins. The most recent game between the two sides, which was played at Ipswich's Portman Road on 24 September 1994, finished in a 3–2 win for Ipswich. The Manchester United players were indignant at Ipswich's enthusiastic celebrations after the win: the United midfielder, Brian McClair, said "they were more than exuberant in their celebrations, so that stuck a bit". In the period between the two sides' meetings that season, Ipswich had replaced John Lyall with George Burley as their manager.

Despite this contrast in the fortunes of the two clubs, United had won just one of their four meetings with Ipswich in the first two seasons of the Premier League; they had been held to draws in both of Ipswich's visits to Old Trafford, and lost 2–1 on their first Premier League visit to Portman Road in January 1993.

== Team selection ==
Ipswich selected a back four that featured David Linighan, Neil Thompson, John Wark and Frank Yallop; they had an average age of 32, and were described by The Guardian's Richard Barker as "one of the slowest back fours the game has seen". Up front, Lee Chapman started, but Paul Mason – who had scored twice during Ipswich's victory over United in September – was a substitute. Despite already having conceded 60 league goals that season, Burley had stated Ipswich's intention to attack: "I'm certainly not going to put nine behind the ball. We'll play two up front and look to get forward".

Prior to the game, Manchester United's Russian winger and season's top scorer Andrei Kanchelskis had handed in a transfer request, which was rejected by the United manager, Alex Ferguson. Kanchelskis, along with Ryan Giggs, Cole and Mark Hughes, made up United's attack for the match. The pairing of Cole and Hughes up front was not considered well-matched; The Guardian's Stephen Bierley suggested that Cole was much better matched with Eric Cantona, but the French forward was serving a nine-month suspension for kicking a spectator. United had conceded just three league goals at Old Trafford all season.

== Match ==
=== Summary ===
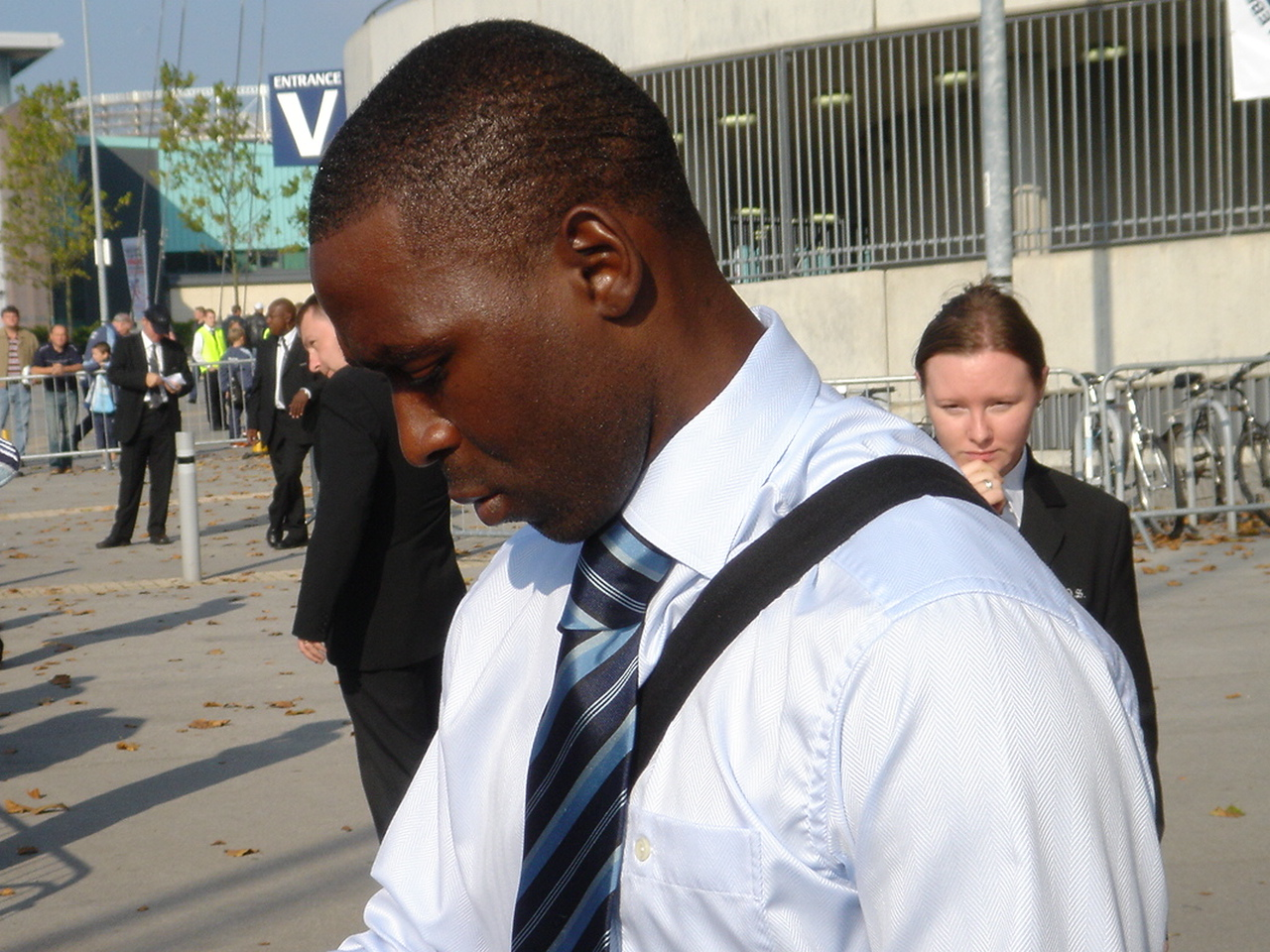
Andy Cole scored a Premier League record of five goals in the game.

The match took place at Old Trafford at 15:00 on 4 March 1995 in front of a crowd of 43,804, the largest in the league to date that season. Manchester United kicked off, attacking the Stretford End at the west end of the stadium, and within the first few minutes they had put the ball into the Ipswich penalty area five times; from three crosses and two corner kicks. According to Rogan Taylor's report for The Observer, the Ipswich defence was panicked by these early attacks, and he suggested that Andy Cole should have scored from one of them, had he not accidentally stepped on the ball. In the 15th minute, after an attack down the left wing, Hughes turned near the edge of the six-yard box, and played the ball out to Roy Keane on the edge of the area. Keane kept his shot low, and it went in off the post. Four minutes later, Giggs dispossessed Ipswich's Canadian right-back, Frank Yallop, on the halfway line. He broke clear and passed the ball to Cole, who rolled it in from close range. In the 37th minute, Kanchelskis attacked up the right wing for Manchester United, and crossed the ball into the box; Hughes shot at goal with a bicycle kick that hit the bar and rebounded to Cole, who scored his second of the game and made it 3–0. During his half-time team talk, Ferguson urged his team on, challenging them to score another three goals.

Keane was replaced with Lee Sharpe at half-time. Seven minutes after the break, Hughes passed the ball out to Denis Irwin, who crossed it into the area. In the confusion, it was initially reported that Yallop had put the ball into his own goal, but video replays showed that the final touch had been from Cole, securing his hat-trick. Within a minute, a low cross from Giggs found Hughes, who scored United's fifth with a volley that went in off the crossbar. The pair were also responsible for United's next goal; the Ipswich goalkeeper Craig Forrest parried a shot from Giggs out to Hughes, who headed it in. When Ian Marshall replaced Chapman in the 64th minute, Marshall thanked United's defender Gary Pallister "for being invited to join the practice match", according to an article published by United. A minute later, Hughes helped to set up the seventh goal with a pass to McClair, whose shot was saved by Forrest but rebounded to Cole, who put it in the net. In the 73rd minute, a foul was given against Forrest, who the referee, Graham Poll, cautioned for handling the ball outside of his area. While Forrest was arguing the decision, Manchester United took the free kick quickly, and Paul Ince lobbed the ball straight into the empty goal to make the score 8–0. In the last few minutes of the match, Cole scored his fifth and United's ninth, from a corner delivered by Giggs. The United fans chanted "we want ten", to which the away fans responded "we want one". The match finished 9–0 to Manchester United.

=== Details ===
4 March 1995
15:00

Manchester United	9–0	Ipswich Town
Keane 15'; Cole 19', 37', 53', 65', 87'; Hughes 55', 59'; Ince 72'	Report

Old Trafford, Manchester
Attendance: 43,804
Referee: Graham Poll (Tilehurst)

Manchester United	Ipswich Town

GK	1	(Denmark) Peter Schmeichel
RB	16	(Republic of Ireland) Roy Keane	(substituted off) 46'
CB	4	(England) Steve Bruce (c)	(substituted off) 80'
CB	6	(England) Gary Pallister
LB	3	(Republic of Ireland) Denis Irwin
RM	14	(Russia) Andrei Kanchelskis
CM	9	(Scotland) Brian McClair
CM	8	(England) Paul Ince
LM	11	(Wales) Ryan Giggs
CF	17	(England) Andy Cole
CF	10	(Wales) Mark Hughes
Substitutes:
GK	13	(England) Gary Walsh
MF	5	(England) Lee Sharpe	(substituted on) 46'
MF	19	(England) Nicky Butt	(substituted on) 80'
Manager:
(Scotland) Alex Ferguson

GK	1	(Canada) Craig Forrest	(yellow card) 71'
RB	19	(Canada) Frank Yallop
CB	5	(Scotland) John Wark
CB	6	(England) David Linighan	(yellow card) 52'
LB	3	(England) Neil Thompson
RM	18	(England) Steve Palmer
CM	7	(Wales) Geraint Williams
CM	14	(England) Steve Sedgley
LM	21	(England) Stuart Slater
CF	11	(England) Lee Chapman		(substituted off) 64'
CF	33	(Scotland) Alex Mathie
Substitutes:
GK	23	(England) Phil Morgan
MF	4	(England) Paul Mason
FW	10	(England) Ian Marshall		(substituted on) 64'
Manager:
(Scotland) George Burley

Match officials

- Linesmen:
  - M. A. Cooper (Walsall)
  - W. Markham (Blackburn)
- Standby official:
  - A. S. Hogg (Sheffield)

Match rules

- 90 minutes
- No extra time or penalties
- Three named substitutes, of which two may be used

=== Statistics ===
Statistics
	Manchester United	Ipswich Town
Goals scored	9	0
Shots on target	14	1
Shots off target	7	5
Free kicks	8	10
Offside	3	2
Fouls committed	7	6
Corner kicks	8	4
Yellow cards	0	2
Red cards	0	0

== Reaction ==
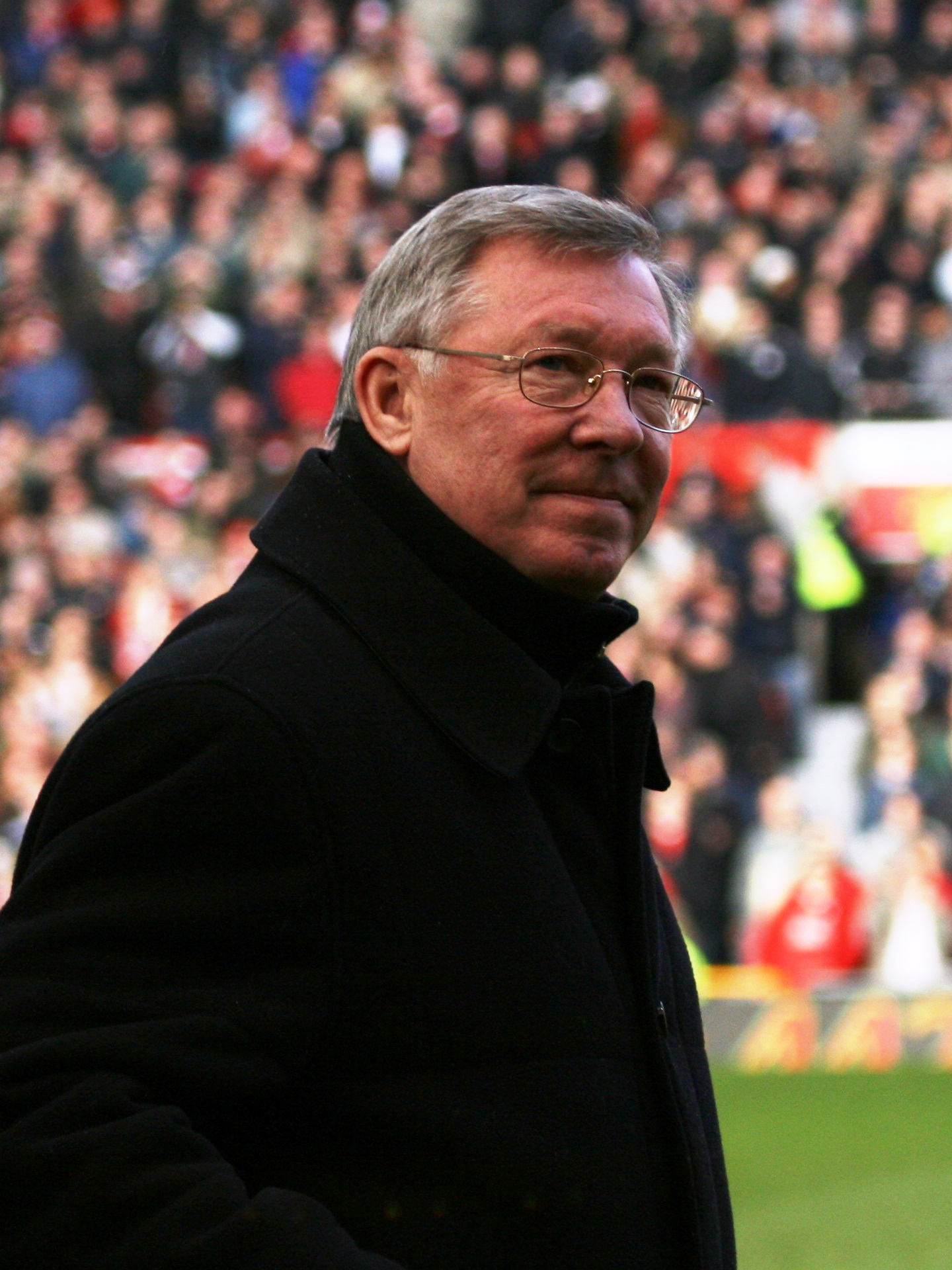
Manchester United manager Alex Ferguson lauded his team's performance.

The result was Manchester United's biggest league victory in 103 years, matching the nine-goal margin they recorded in a 10–1 win at home to Wolverhampton Wanderers on 15 October 1892. Alex Ferguson had previously won twice 8–0 as Aberdeen manager, but noted: "That was as near as perfection as you can get. The performance superseded the number of goals scored." According to his biographer, Michael Crick, Ferguson later said he was "praying that United wouldn't reach ten, as he felt sorry for the Ipswich manager". The Ipswich manager George Burley declined to face the press for the normal post-match interview. The victory cancelled out Blackburn's goal difference advantage at the top of the table as Rovers beat Aston Villa 1–0 at Villa Park on the same day, although Rovers' manager Kenny Dalglish shrugged off the result saying, "You get three points whether you win 9–0 or 1–0." McClair referenced Ipswich's win earlier in the season, but denied that the scale of the win had been about revenge: "it wasn't a case of: 'We're going to humiliate you and grind you into dust,' it was just: 'We're going to score as many as we can and keep going until it's over.' That's just the Manchester United way: it's never over."

Although he was hurt in a tackle by Ipswich defender Linighan, Cole was determined to play on in the second half despite his manager's suggestion he be substituted as the points were already secured. Cole noted: "I sensed a hat-trick was there for the taking and I was determined to get one". Cole's five-goal haul was later equalled by Alan Shearer – for Newcastle United against Sheffield Wednesday in September 1999; Jermain Defoe – for Tottenham Hotspur against Wigan Athletic in November 2009; Dimitar Berbatov – for Manchester United against Blackburn Rovers in November 2010; and Sergio Agüero – for Manchester City against Newcastle United in October 2015. Cole's haul was the first time for twelve years that a player in the top flight of English football had scored five goals in a game: Ian Rush and Tony Woodcock each scored five in separate matches on the same day in 1983.

Manchester United went on to finish second in the league, just one point behind Blackburn, while Ipswich were relegated, finishing bottom of the table. Ipswich goalkeeper Forrest went on to concede a further seven goals against Manchester United, playing for West Ham United in a 7–1 defeat in April 2000. Cole recalled that when he met Forrest years later, Forrest introduced Cole to his wife as "the man who made his life a misery".

The record Manchester United set for the biggest Premier League win would not be equalled until Leicester City beat Southampton by the same scoreline, away from home on 25 October 2019. The following season, United would equal their biggest victory, also against Southampton, with a 9–0 win at Old Trafford on 2 February 2021, and the record was again matched in August 2022, when Liverpool beat AFC Bournemouth 9–0.
