= Southampton F.C. 0–9 Leicester City F.C. =

2019 football match in Southampton, England

Southampton v Leicester City
- The match programme cover
- Event: 2019–20 Premier League
Southampton	Leicester City
0	9
- Date: 25 October 2019
- Venue: St Mary's Stadium, Southampton
- Man of the Match: Jamie Vardy (Leicester City)
- Referee: Andre Marriner (Birmingham)
- Attendance: 28,762
- Weather: Rainy; 15 °C (59 °F); 88% humidity

The 2019–20 Premier League match between Southampton and Leicester City at St Mary's Stadium, Southampton, took place on Friday 25 October 2019. Leicester won the match 9–0, equalling Manchester United's 9–0 win against Ipswich Town in 1995 for the largest win in the history of the competition. The result also set the new record for the biggest away win in the history of English top-flight football.

Fifteen months later, on 2 February 2021, Southampton were beaten 9–0 again, this time to Manchester United. The 2021 loss to United made Southampton the first team to lose as such twice, let alone in consecutive seasons.

== Background ==
Leicester started the match in third, level with Chelsea on 17 points but ahead on goal difference. Southampton were in 17th place, tied on 8 points with Newcastle United but also ahead on goal difference.

== Match ==
=== Summary ===
Ben Chilwell opened the scoring in the 10th minute. Ryan Bertrand of Southampton was dismissed for a studs-up challenge in the build-up to the goal, confirmed by the video assistant referee (VAR), two minutes later. Leicester were 3–0 up by the 19th minute, thanks to Youri Tielemans and Ayoze Pérez. Pérez added the fourth on the 39th minute, with Jamie Vardy scoring on the stroke of half-time to send Leicester into the break ahead 5–0. Pérez completed his hat-trick on the 57th minute, with Vardy adding his second and Leicester's seventh a minute later. James Maddison scored a 85th minute free-kick before Jamie Vardy completed his own hat-trick with a penalty four minutes into stoppage time. The final whistle went after the penalty was made. It was only the second time in Premier League history that two players scored a hat-trick for one team in the same game, last coming in an Arsenal 6–1 win over Southampton on 7 May 2003 with Jermaine Pennant and Robert Pires scoring three goals apiece.

=== Match details ===
25 October 2019
20:00 BST

Southampton	0–9	Leicester City
	Report	Chilwell 10'; Tielemans 17'; Pérez 19', 39', 57'; Vardy 45', 58', 90+4' (pen.); Maddison 85'

St Mary's Stadium, Southampton
Attendance: 28,762
Referee: Andre Marriner (Birmingham)

Southampton	Leicester City

GK	28	(England) Angus Gunn
CB	35	(Poland) Jan Bednarek
CB	3	(Japan) Maya Yoshida
CB	4	(Denmark) Jannik Vestergaard		(substituted off) 45'
RWB	43	(France) Yan Valery		(substituted off) 70'
CM	16	(England) James Ward-Prowse
CM	14	(Spain) Oriol Romeu
CM	23	(Denmark) Pierre-Emile Højbjerg (c)
LWB	21	(England) Ryan Bertrand	(red card) 12'
CF	9	(England) Danny Ings		(substituted off) 45'
CF	22	(England) Nathan Redmond
Substitutes:
GK	1	(England) Alex McCarthy
DF	5	(England) Jack Stephens		(substituted on) 45'
DF	38	(Austria) Kevin Danso		(substituted on) 45'
MF	17	(Scotland) Stuart Armstrong		(substituted on) 70'
MF	19	(Morocco) Sofiane Boufal
FW	7	(Republic of Ireland) Shane Long
FW	10	(Scotland) Ché Adams
Manager:
(Austria) Ralph Hasenhüttl

GK	1	(Denmark) Kasper Schmeichel (c)
RB	21	(Portugal) Ricardo Pereira
CB	6	(Northern Ireland) Jonny Evans
CB	4	(Turkey) Çağlar Söyüncü
LB	3	(England) Ben Chilwell
DM	25	(Nigeria) Wilfred Ndidi
RM	17	(Spain) Ayoze Pérez	(substituted off) 74'
CM	8	(Belgium) Youri Tielemans
CM	10	(England) James Maddison
LM	15	(England) Harvey Barnes	(substituted off) 72'
CF	9	(England) Jamie Vardy
Substitutes:
GK	12	(Wales) Danny Ward
DF	2	(England) James Justin
DF	5	(Jamaica) Wes Morgan
MF	7	(England) Demarai Gray	(substituted on) 74'
MF	11	(England) Marc Albrighton	(substituted on) 72'
MF	20	(England) Hamza Choudhury
MF	26	(Belgium) Dennis Praet
Manager:
(Northern Ireland) Brendan Rodgers

Man of the Match:
Jamie Vardy (Leicester City)

Assistant referees:
Scott Ledger
Simon Long
Fourth official:
Andrew Madley
Video assistant referee:
Mike Dean
Assistant video assistant referee:
Andy Halliday

Match rules

- 90 minutes
- No extra time or penalties
- Seven named substitutes
- Maximum of three substitutions

=== Statistics ===
Statistic	Southampton	Leicester City
Goals scored	0	9
Total shots	6	25
Shots on target	3	15
Ball possession	27%	73%
Corner kicks	2	7
Fouls conceded	3	12
Yellow cards	0	0
Red cards	1	0

== Post-match ==
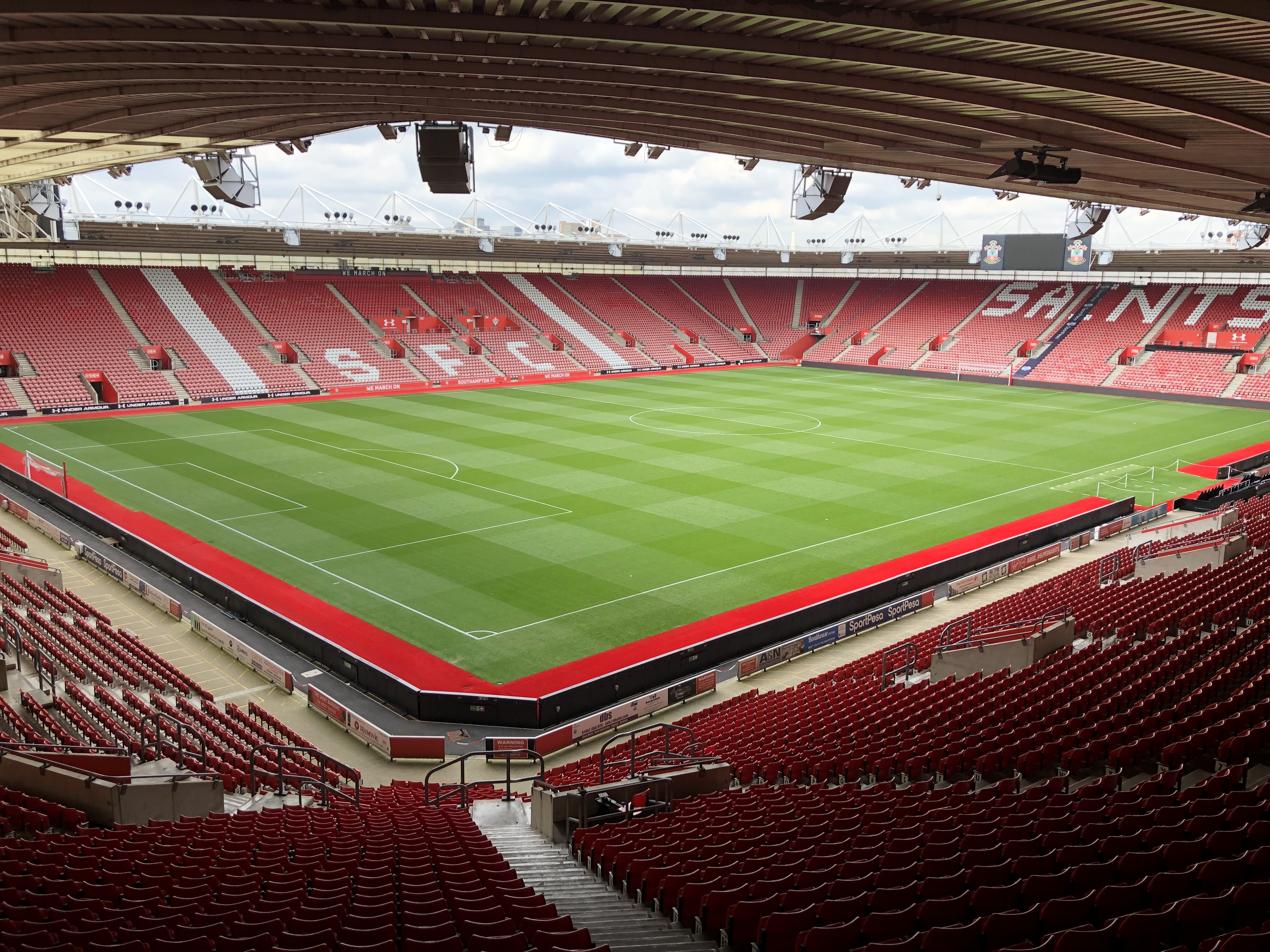
The match was played at St Mary's Stadium in Southampton.

Leicester moved up to second in the table, while Southampton dropped to 18th. As the match took place two days before the first anniversary of the 2018 Leicester helicopter crash, several players dedicated the win to their late owner, Vichai Srivaddhanaprabha, who died in that incident. Southampton players and coaching staff later donated their wages from the day of the game to a charity run by the club, Saints Foundation.

Later that season, the two sides would play each other again in the return fixture at the King Power Stadium, in January 2020. Southampton went on to win the match 2–1.
