= Ibrahima Diallo (footballer, born 1999) =

French association football player

Personal information
- Full name: Ibrahima Diallo
- Date of birth: 8 March 1999 (age 27)
- Place of birth: Tours, France
- Height: 1.79 m (5 ft 10 in)
- Position: Defensive midfielder

Team information
- Current team: Al-Shahaniya (on loan from Al Khor)

Youth career
- 2002–2004: Angoulême
- 2004–2007: Tours
- 2007–2014: Chambray-Lès-Tours
- 2014–2018: Monaco

Senior career*
Years	Team	Apps	(Gls)
2017–2018	Monaco B	18	(0)
2018–2019	Monaco	0	(0)
2018–2019	→ Brest (loan)	23	(0)
2018	→ Brest B (loan)	3	(0)
2019–2020	Brest	24	(0)
2020–2023	Southampton	62	(0)
2023–2025	Al-Duhail	21	(3)
2025–	Al-Khor	8	(0)
2025–2026	→ Al-Ahli (loan)	17	(0)
2026–	→ Al-Shahaniya (loan)	6	(0)

International career
2016	France U18	3	(0)
2017	France U19	5	(0)
2019	France U20	6	(0)
2020	France U21	4	(0)
- * Club domestic league appearances and goals as of 06:26, 14 November 2026 (UTC)

Ibrahima Diallo (born 8 March 1999) is a French professional footballer who plays as a defensive midfielder for Qatar Stars League club Al-Shahaniya, on loan from Al-Khor.

Diallo is a product of the Monaco academy. In 2018, he joined Brest on loan before joining the club permanently a year later. Diallo moved to Southampton in 2020. He joined Al-Duhail in July 2023. Diallo joined Al-Khor in January 2025. He had loan spells with Al-Ahli and Al-Shahaniya. Diallo has represented his country at youth levels.

== Club career ==
=== Early career ===
Diallo is a graduate of the Monaco youth academy, joining them at the age of 15. Diallo joined Brest on loan in 2018. He made his professional debut with the club in a 1–1 (4–3) penalty shootout win in the Coupe de la Ligue over Sochaux on 14 August 2018.

=== Southampton ===
On 4 October 2020, Diallo signed for Premier League club Southampton on a four-year contract, for an undisclosed fee. On 17 October 2020, Diallo made his first appearance for the club in a 3–3 draw against Chelsea, where he came off the bench to replace Oriol Romeu. His first Premier League start came in a 0–0 draw against Fulham on 26 December.

On 21 September 2021, Diallo scored his first professional goal, in the EFL Cup against Sheffield United which ended 2–2 at full time before Southampton advanced 4–2 on penalties.

=== Al-Duhail ===
On 19 July 2023, Diallo signed for Qatar Stars League club Al-Duhail.

=== Al-Khor ===
On 30 January 2025, Diallo joined Al-Khor. Following his move to Al Khor, he joined Al-Ahli on loan for the 2025–26 season. Diallo joined Al-Shahaniya on loan for the 2026–27 season.

== Personal life ==
Diallo was born in France and is of Senegalese descent. His older brother Abdou is a footballer for Al-Arabi and the Senegal national team.

== Career statistics ==
As of match played 16 October 2026

Appearances and goals by club, season and competition
Club	Season	League			National cup (Note: Includes Coupe de France, FA Cup, Emir Cup)		League cup (Note: Includes Coupe de la Ligue, EFL Cup, QSL Cup)		Continental		Other		Total	
Club	Season	Division	Apps	Goals	Apps	Goals	Apps	Goals	Apps	Goals	Apps	Goals	Apps	Goals
Monaco B	2017–18	Championnat National 2	18	0	—		—		—		—		18	0
Brest (loan)	2018–19	Ligue 2	23	0	1	0	2	0	—		—		26	0
Brest B (loan)	2018–19	Championnat National 3	3	0	—		—		—		—		3	0
Brest	2019–20	Ligue 1	19	0	1	0	2	0	—		—		22	0
Brest	2020–21	Ligue 1	5	0	0	0	—		—		—		5	0
Brest	Total		24	0	1	0	2	0	—		—		27	0
Southampton	2020–21	Premier League	22	0	4	0	0	0	—		—		26	0
Southampton	2021–22	Premier League	23	0	4	0	3	1	—		—		30	1
Southampton	2022–23	Premier League	17	0	2	0	5	0	—		—		24	0
Southampton	Total		62	0	10	0	8	1	—		—		80	1
Al-Duhail	2023–24	Qatar Stars League	13	3	3	0	5	2	—		1 (Note: Appearance in Qatar–UAE Super Cup)	0	22	5
Al-Duhail	2024–25	Qatar Stars League	10	0	0	0	0	0	—		—		10	0
Al-Duhail	Total		23	3	3	0	5	2	—		1	0	32	5
Al-Khor	2024–25	Qatar Stars League	8	0	1	0	0	0	—		—		9	0
Al-Khor	2025–26	Qatar Stars League 2	0	0	0	0	0	0	—		—		0	0
Al-Khor	Total		8	0	1	0	0	0	—		—		9	0
Al-Ahli (loan)	2025–26	Qatar Stars League	17	0	1	0	0	0	8	0	—		26	0
Al-Shahaniya (loan)	2026–27	Qatar Stars League	6	0	1	0	0	0	—		—		5	0
Career total			184	3	18	0	17	3	8	0	1	0	226	7
