= Ralph Hasenhüttl =

Austrian footballer and manager (born 1967)

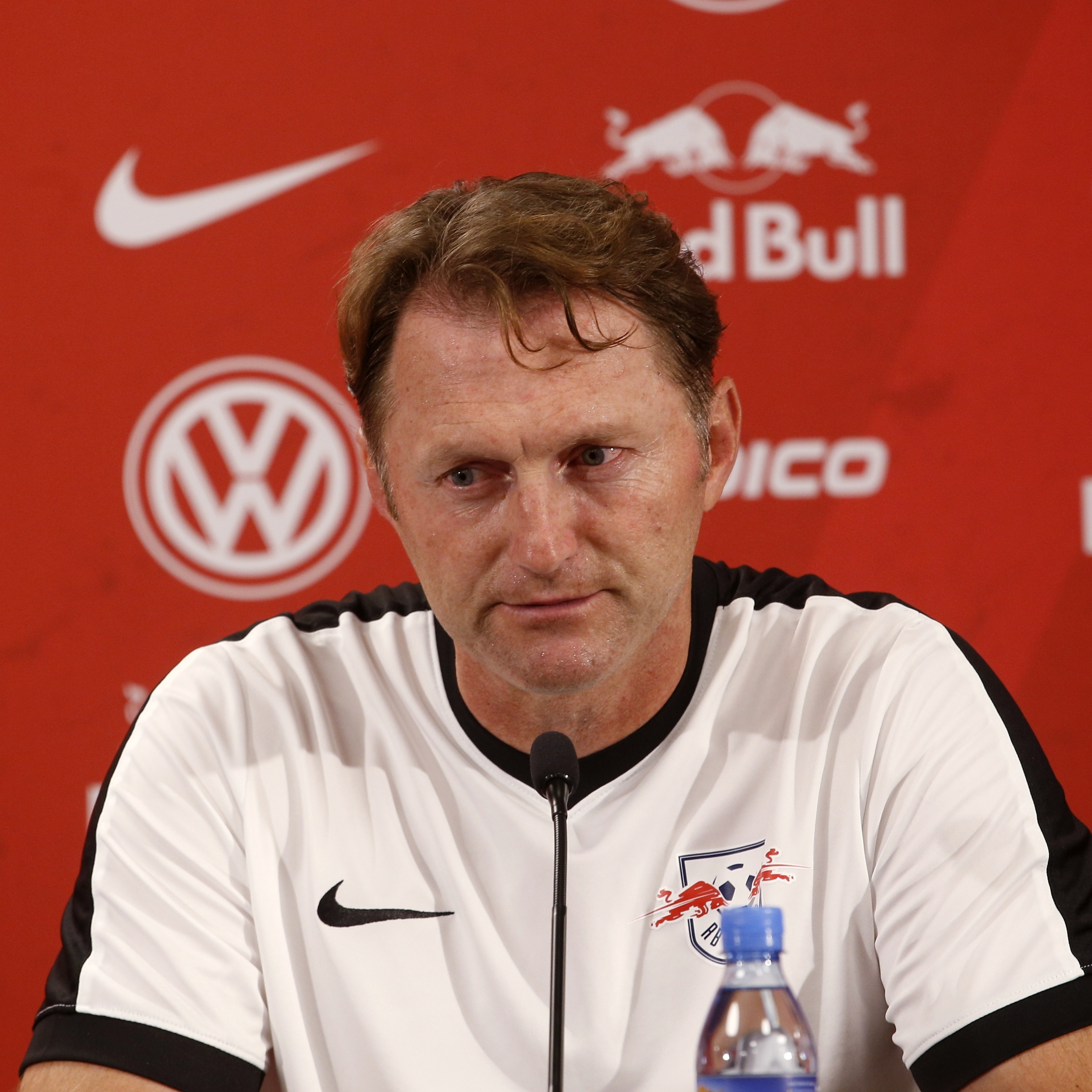
- Hasenhüttl with RB Leipzig in 2016

Personal information
- Full name: Ralph Hasenhüttl
- Date of birth: 9 August 1967 (age 59)
- Place of birth: Graz, Austria
- Height: 1.91 m (6 ft 3 in)
- Position: Centre forward

Senior career*
Years	Team	Apps	(Gls)
1985–1989	GAK	65	(20)
1989–1994	Austria Wien	134	(44)
1994–1996	Austria Salzburg	53	(13)
1996–1997	Mechelen	27	(8)
1997–1998	Lierse	22	(4)
1998–2000	1. FC Köln	41	(3)
2000–2002	Greuther Fürth	51	(13)
2002–2004	Bayern Munich II	57	(14)
Total		450	(119)

International career
1988–1994	Austria	8	(3)

Managerial career
- 2007–2010: SpVgg Unterhaching
- 2011–2013: VfR Aalen
- 2013–2016: Ingolstadt 04
- 2016–2018: RB Leipzig
- 2018–2022: Southampton
- 2024–2025: VfL Wolfsburg
- * Club domestic league appearances and goals

Ralph Hasenhüttl (born 9 August 1967) is an Austrian professional football manager and former player who was most recently the manager of VfL Wolfsburg. During his playing career, he played as a centre forward.

As a manager, he has developed a reputation as an Alpine Klopp for similarities in the style of play of his teams. He managed RB Leipzig to a second placed finish in their debut season in the Bundesliga before having a four-year period in charge of Southampton in the Premier League. In March 2024, he returned to German football as manager of VfL Wolfsburg and was dismissed in May 2025.

== Playing career ==
Born in Graz, Hasenhüttl began his career with hometown club GAK, making his first team debut in the 1985–86 season. He transferred to Austria Wien in 1989, with whom he won three successive Bundesliga titles and two Austrian Cups. He moved to Austria Salzburg in 1994, where he won another Bundesliga title as well as an Austrian Super Cup. In 1996, Hasenhüttl moved abroad, with spells at Mechelen and Lierse in Belgium. In 1998–99 season, he signed for 1. FC Köln, for a fee equivalent to €200,000. In his two years in Cologne, however, he only scored three goals and in 2000 moved to Greuther Fürth.

Hasenhüttl finished his career at Bayern Munich II, in the Regionalliga Süd.

Hasenhüttl played eight times for the Austria national team, scoring three goals.

== Managerial career ==
=== SpVgg Unterhaching ===
Between 2004 and 2005, Hasenhüttl was a youth-team coach at SpVgg Unterhaching. Following the sacking of Harry Deutinger in March 2007, he became caretaker manager until the appointment of Werner Lorant, under whom he worked as assistant coach. On 4 October 2007, Hasenhüttl became the new head coach. His first match was a 2–2 draw against SSV Reutlingen 05. Unterhaching finished in sixth place that season.

In the 2008–09 season, in the newly formed 3. Liga, the team's performances earned them fourth place in the table, missing out on a play-off place by one point. Unterhaching were eliminated in the first round of the German Cup. In the 2009–10 season, they failed to build upon their success, achieving 31 points in 24 games, resulting in Hasenhüttl's sacking on 22 February 2010. His final match was a 1–1 draw against Borussia Dortmund II on 21 February 2010. He finished with a record of 40 wins, 20 draws, and 28 losses.

=== VfR Aalen ===
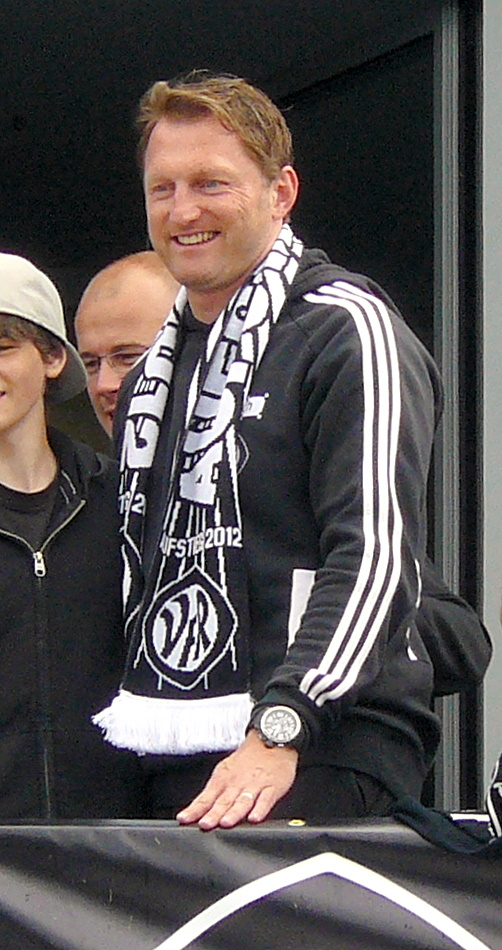
Hasenhüttl with VfR Aalen in May 2012, celebrating the club's promotion to the 2. Bundesliga

In January 2011, Hasenhüttl succeeded Rainer Scharinger as the coach of third division VfR Aalen, then in 16th place, one point above the relegation zone. His first match was a 1–1 draw against VfB Stuttgart II. Aalen's survival in the 3. Liga earned him a year's contract extension. In the 2011–12 season, he completely rebuilt the team, bringing in eight new players and releasing 14, with the aim of a mid-table finish. After a slow start to the season, the team found itself in sixth place at the winter break, only a point behind the play-off position. The team's run continued into the second half of the season, which included an eight-game winning streak, earning Hasenhüttl a further two-year contract extension in November 2011. At the end of the season, Aalen finished in second place, earning automatic promotion to the 2. Bundesliga.

During pre-season training in the summer of 2012, Hasenhüttl contracted a Hantavirus infection, but returned to work three weeks into the 2012–13 season. Hasenhüttl had switched from a 4–4–2 to a 4–5–1 formation, to facilitate a fast, counter-attacking game, with success. By the winter break, Aalen were in fifth place. The team finished the season in ninth place, the highest of the newly promoted teams. After two-and-a-half successful years at Aalen, Hasenhüttl resigned in June 2013, when Aalen lost its main sponsor and sporting director Markus Schupp imposed an austerity programme for the following season, with several departing players not being replaced. He finished with a record of 36 wins, 28 draws and 29 losses.

=== Ingolstadt 04 ===
In October 2013, Hasenhüttl was appointed as coach of Ingolstadt 04, replacing Marco Kurz. In his first season, he took them from bottom of the 2. Bundesliga to tenth place. In the 2014–15 season, Hasenhüttl took Ingolstadt to the Bundesliga for the first time, finishing the season as 2. Bundesliga champions. In the 2015–16 season, he was successful in securing Ingolstadt's Bundesliga survival, finishing in eleventh place, but chose not to extend his contract.

=== RB Leipzig ===
In May 2016, he was confirmed as the new manager of newly promoted RB Leipzig. He took over on 1 July 2016. His first match was against Dynamo Dresden in the German Cup. Leipzig lost 5–4 in a shootout. In his and the club's debut season in the Bundesliga, Hasenhüttl guided Leipzig to a second-place finish. The following season, the club finished sixth, with Hasenhüttl asking for his contract to be terminated, as he was not comfortable acting as an interim for incoming boss Julian Nagelsmann. In May 2018, he left RB Leipzig.

=== Southampton ===
On 5 December 2018, Hasenhüttl was appointed as the new manager of Southampton, succeeding Mark Hughes making him the first Austrian to manage in the Premier League. At the time of his appointment, Southampton occupied the last relegation place, one point from safety. His first game in charge was a 0–1 defeat at Cardiff City, three days after his appointment. His first win as Southampton's manager came on 16 December in a 3–2 win at home to Arsenal, ending the Gunners' four-month 22-match unbeaten run. On 27 April 2019, Southampton secured Premier League status after a 3–3 draw against AFC Bournemouth at St Mary's. They finished the season in 16th place.

Hasenhüttl's side suffered a 9–0 home loss to Leicester City on 25 October 2019 and the joint-worst loss in Premier League history and worst on home soil. He apologized for the result and was given the club's backing to remain in his job.

In June 2020, he signed a new contract to extend his stay at the club until 2024. Despite being in the relegation zone in early November, Southampton ended the season on a seven-game unbeaten streak to finish in 11th place, their best finish in three seasons. Their final tally of 52 points was the team's highest total since 2015–16, and Hasenhüttl was named Manager of the Month for July 2020.

Southampton began the 2020–21 season strongly, briefly topping the Premier League table at the beginning of November. On 2 January 2021, Southampton became the first Premier League team to defeat all seven winners of the competition in the season after a title win following a 1–0 victory at home against Liverpool. Despite a positive start, Hasenhüttl's side suffered a second 9–0 defeat away to Manchester United on 2 February 2021. They continued to struggle throughout the rest of the season and won only four of their last twenty-one games, eventually finishing 15th.

On 7 November 2022, Southampton parted company with Hasenhüttl. At the time, Southampton were in the Premier League relegation zone with 12 points after 14 games.

=== VfL Wolfsburg ===
On 17 March 2024, he was appointed as the new head coach of VfL Wolfsburg. By 20 April 2024, he pulled the club out of the relegation zone of the Bundesliga. On 4 May 2025, after a 4–0 defeat to Borussia Dortmund, he was sacked.

== Coaching style ==
Like Jürgen Klopp, Hasenhüttl is a notable proponent of Gegenpressing, a tactic in which the team, after losing possession of the ball, immediately attempts to win back possession, rather than falling back to regroup. This has seen him nicknamed "The Alpine Klopp".

In his first season at Southampton, he initially used a 3-5-2, switching to his preferred 4-2-2-2 mid-way into his second season, as he had previously implemented at RB Leipzig. However, in the 2021–22 season he began sometimes using 3-5-2 and 3-4-3 formations in order to gain more tactical flexibility against different opponents.

He outlined what he wants to see from his team as "Pressing. Hunting. Be hungry. When you have the ball, find a quick decision, quick transition to the front. It's about being emotional, being full of passion. Also, keep the tempo on a high level and don't slow down the game. That's what I think the people want to see."

== Personal life ==
His son Patrick was born in Mechelen in 1997, while Ralph was playing for K.V. Mechelen, playing as a forward before his retirement for health reasons in March 2024.

== Managerial statistics ==
As of matches played 3 May 2025

Managerial record by team and tenure
Team	From	To	Record								
Team	From	To	P	W	D	L	GF	GA	GD	Win %	Ref.
SpVgg Unterhaching	4 October 2007	22 February 2010	88	40	20	28	129	115	+14	45.45	
VfR Aalen	3 January 2011	8 June 2013	93	36	28	29	115	107	+8	38.71	
Ingolstadt 04	7 October 2013	30 June 2016	95	36	34	25	113	95	+18	37.89	
RB Leipzig	1 July 2016	16 May 2018	83	40	19	24	150	116	+34	48.19	
Southampton	5 December 2018	7 November 2022	173	59	41	73	231	280	−49	34.10	
VfL Wolfsburg	17 March 2024	4 May 2025	44	17	9	18	68	65	+3	38.64	
Total			576	228	151	197	805	779	+26	39.58	

== Honours ==
=== Player ===
Austria Wien

- Austrian Bundesliga: 1990–91, 1991–92, 1992–93
- Austrian Cup: 1991–92, 1993–94

Austria Salzburg

- Austrian Bundesliga: 1994–95
- Austrian Supercup: 1995

Lierse SK

- Belgian Super Cup: 1997

=== Manager ===
Aalen

- 3. Liga promotion: 2011–12

FC Ingolstadt 04

- 2. Bundesliga: 2014–15

Individual

- Premier League Manager of the Month: July 2020
