= Premier League records and statistics =

Premier League records

The Premier League is an English professional league for association football clubs. At the top of the English football league system, it is the country's primary football competition and is contested by 20 clubs. The competition was formed in February 1992 following the decision of clubs in the Football League First Division to break away from The Football League, in order to take advantage of a lucrative television rights deal.

As of 24 May 2026.

== Team records ==
=== Titles ===
- Most titles: 13, Manchester United (1992–93, 1993–94, 1995–96, 1996–97, 1998–99, 1999–2000, 2000–01, 2002–03, 2006–07, 2007–08, 2008–09, 2010–11, 2012–13)
- Most consecutive title wins: 4, Manchester City (2020–21, 2021–22, 2022–23, 2023–24)
- Biggest title-winning margin: 19 points, 2017–18; Manchester City (100 points) over Manchester United (81 points)
- Smallest title-winning margin: 0 points and +8 goal difference – 2011–12; Manchester City (+64) over Manchester United (+56). Both ended with 89 points, but Manchester City won the title with a superior goal difference, the first and only time that goal difference has decided the Premier League title.
- Earliest title win with the most games remaining: 7 games, Liverpool (2019–20) (Note: Because of the league's suspension due to the COVID-19 pandemic in the United Kingdom, Liverpool's title win on 25 June is also the latest a team has clinched the title; no other Premier League season has played matches in June.)
- Undefeated title win: Arsenal (2003–04)

=== Points ===
==== Most points ====
Pos	Team	Pld	W	D	L	GF	GA	GD	Pts
1	Manchester City (2017–18) (C)	38	32	4	2	106	27	+79	100
2	Liverpool (2019–20) (C)	38	32	3	3	85	33	+52	99
3	Manchester City (2018–19) (C)	38	32	2	4	95	23	+72	98
4	Liverpool (2018–19) (R)	38	30	7	1	89	22	+67	97
5	Chelsea (2004–05) (C)	38	29	8	1	72	15	+57	95
6	Manchester City (2021–22) (C)	38	29	6	3	99	26	+73	93
7	Chelsea (2016–17) (C)	38	30	3	5	85	33	+52	93
8	Liverpool (2021–22) (R)	38	28	8	2	94	26	+68	92
9	Manchester United (1993–94) (C)	42	27	11	4	80	38	+42	92
10	Manchester City (2023–24) (C)	38	28	7	3	96	34	+62	91

(C) Champions; (R) Runners-up

==== Fewest points ====
Pos	Team	Pld	W	D	L	GF	GA	GD	Pts
1	Derby County (2007–08) (R)	38	1	8	29	20	89	−69	11
2	Southampton (2024–25) (R)	38	2	6	30	26	86	−60	12
3	Sunderland (2005–06) (R)	38	3	6	29	26	86	−60	15
4	Sheffield United (2023–24) (R)	38	3	7	28	35	104	−69	16
5	Huddersfield Town (2018–19) (R)	38	3	7	28	22	76	−54	16
6	Aston Villa (2015–16) (R)	38	3	8	27	27	76	−49	17
7	Portsmouth (2009–10) (R)	38	7	7	24	34	66	−32	19 (Note: Portsmouth were docked nine points for entering administration.)
8	Sunderland (2002–03) (R)	38	4	7	27	21	65	−44	19
9	Wolverhampton Wanderers (2025–26) (R)	38	3	11	24	27	68	−41	20
10	Norwich City (2019–20) (R)	38	5	6	27	26	75	−49	21

(R) Relegated

==== Records ====
- Most points in a season: 100, Manchester City (2017–18)
- Most home points in a season: 55
  - Chelsea (2005–06)
  - Manchester United (2010–11)
  - Manchester City (2011–12)
  - Liverpool (2019–20)
- Most away points in a season: 50, Manchester City (2017–18)
- Fewest points in a season: 11, Derby County (2007–08)
- Fewest home points in a season: 6, Southampton (2024–25)
- Fewest away points in a season: 3, Derby County (2007–08)
- Most points in a season without winning the league: 97, Liverpool (2018–19)
- Fewest points in a season while winning the league: 75, Manchester United (1996–97)
- Most points in a season while being relegated:
  - 42 games: 49, Crystal Palace (1992–93)
  - 38 games: 42, West Ham United (2002–03)
- Most points while bottom of the league:
  - 42 games: 40, Nottingham Forest (1992–93)
  - 38 games: 34, Nottingham Forest (1996–97)
- Most points in a season by a team promoted in the previous season:
  - 42 games: 77, Newcastle United (1993–94) and Nottingham Forest (1994–95)
  - 38 games: 66, Ipswich Town (2000–01)

=== Wins ===
- Most wins in total: 775, Manchester United
- Most wins in a season: 32
  - Manchester City (2017–18, 2018–19)
  - Liverpool (2019–20)
- Most home wins in a season: 18
  - Chelsea (2005–06)
  - Manchester United (2010–11)
  - Manchester City (2011–12, 2018–19)
  - Liverpool (2019–20)
- Most away wins in a season: 16, Manchester City (2017–18)
- Fewest wins in a season: 1, Derby County (2007–08)
- Fewest home wins in a season: 1
  - Sunderland (2005–06)
  - Derby County (2007–08)
  - Ipswich Town, Southampton (2024–25)
- Fewest away wins in a season: 0
  - Leeds United (1992–93)
  - Coventry City (1999–2000)
  - Wolverhampton Wanderers (2003–04, 2025–26)
  - Norwich City (2004–05)
  - Derby County (2007–08)
  - Hull City (2009–10)
- Most consecutive wins: 18
  - Manchester City (26 August – 27 December 2017)
  - Liverpool (27 October 2019 – 24 February 2020)
- Most consecutive wins from the start of a season: 9, Chelsea (2005–06)
- Most consecutive wins to the end of a season: 14, Manchester City (2018–19)
- Most consecutive home wins: 24, Liverpool (9 February 2019 – 5 July 2020)
- Most consecutive away wins: 12, Manchester City (19 December 2020 – 14 May 2021)
- Most consecutive matches without a win: 32, Derby County (2007–08)
- Most consecutive matches without a win from the start of a season: 19, Wolverhampton Wanderers (2025–26)
- Defeated all league opponents at least once in a season:
  - Chelsea (2005–06)
  - Manchester United (2010–11, 2017–18)
  - Manchester City (2017–18, 2018–19)
  - Liverpool (2019–20)
- Most different stadiums won at: 59 (of 61), Liverpool

=== Defeats ===
- Most defeats in total: 478, West Ham United
- Most defeats in a season: 30, Southampton (2024–25)
- Most home defeats in a season: 15
  - Watford (2021–22)
  - Southampton (2024–25)
- Most away defeats in a season: 17, Burnley (2009–10)
- Fewest defeats in a season: 0, Arsenal (2003–04)
- Fewest home defeats in a season: 0
  - Manchester United (1995–96, 1999–2000, 2010–11)
  - Arsenal (1998–99, 2003–04, 2007–08)
  - Chelsea (2004–05, 2005–06, 2006–07, 2007–08, 2014–15)
  - Liverpool (2008–09, 2017–18, 2018–19, 2019–20, 2021–22)
  - Manchester City (2011–12, 2023–24)
  - Tottenham Hotspur (2016–17)
- Fewest away defeats in a season: 0
  - Arsenal (2001–02, 2003–04)
  - Manchester United (2020–21)
- Most consecutive matches undefeated: 49, Arsenal (7 May 2003 – 24 October 2004)
- Most consecutive home matches undefeated: 86, Chelsea (20 March 2004 – 5 October 2008)
- Most consecutive away matches undefeated: 29, Manchester United (17 February 2020 – 19 September 2021)
- Most consecutive defeats over more than one season: 20, Sunderland (2002–03, 2005–06)
- Most consecutive defeats from the start of a season: 7
  - Portsmouth (2009–10)
  - Crystal Palace (2017–18)
- Defeats against all league opponents at least once in a season:
  - Sheffield United (2023–24)
  - Wolverhampton Wanderers (2025–26)

=== Draws ===
- Most draws in total: 366, Everton
- Most draws in a season (42 games): 18
  - Manchester City (1993–94)
  - Sheffield United (1993–94)
  - Southampton (1994–95)
- Most draws in a season (38 games): 18, Bournemouth (2025–26)
- Most home draws in a season: 10
  - Sheffield Wednesday (1996–97)
  - Leicester City (1997–98, 2003–04)
  - Manchester United (2016–17)
  - Bournemouth (2025–26)
- Most away draws in a season: 10
  - Newcastle United (2003–04)
  - Manchester United (2010–11)
- Fewest draws in a season: 2
  - Manchester City (2018–19)
  - Tottenham Hotspur (2018–19)
  - Sheffield United (2020–21)
- Fewest home draws in a season: 0
  - Manchester City (2008–09, 2018–19)
  - Manchester United (2012–13)
  - Chelsea (2016–17)
  - Tottenham Hotspur (2023–24)
- Fewest away draws in a season: 0
  - Tottenham Hotspur (2018–19)
  - Leeds United (2020–21)
- Most consecutive draws: 7
  - Norwich City (1993–94)
  - Southampton (1994–95)
  - Manchester City (2009–10)
- Most consecutive matches without a draw: 32, Tottenham Hotspur (30 April 2018 – 27 February 2019)

=== Goals ===
- Most goals scored in a season: 106, Manchester City (2017–18)
- Fewest goals scored in a season: 20
  - Derby County (2007–08)
  - Sheffield United (2020–21)
- Most goals conceded in a season: 104, Sheffield United (2023–24)
- Fewest goals conceded in a season: 15, Chelsea (2004–05)
- Most own goals scored in a season: 8, Leicester City (2003–04)
- Best goal difference in a season: 79, Manchester City (2017–18)
- Best home goal difference in a season: 54, Chelsea (2009–10)
- Best away goal difference in a season: 32, Manchester City (2017–18)
- Worst goal difference in a season: −69
  - Derby County (2007–08)
  - Sheffield United (2023–24)
- Worst home goal difference in a season: −38, Sheffield United (2023–24)
- Worst away goal difference in a season (21 games): −47, Ipswich Town (1994–95)
- Worst away goal difference in a season (19 games): −38, Derby County (2007–08)
- Highest finish with a negative goal difference: 3rd, Norwich City (1992–93, −4)
- Lowest finish with a positive goal difference: 16th, Manchester City (2003–04, +1)
- Most goals scored in a season by a relegated team: 55, Blackpool (2010–11)
- Most goals scored at home in a season: 68, Chelsea (2009–10)
- Fewest goals scored at home in a season: 9, Fulham (2020–21)
- Most goals conceded at home in a season: 57, Sheffield United (2023–24)
- Fewest goals conceded at home in a season: 4, Manchester United (1994–95)
- Fewest goals conceded away in a season: 9, Chelsea (2004–05)
- Most goals scored away in a season: 48, Liverpool (2013–14)
- Fewest goals scored away in a season: 7, Norwich City (2019–20)
- Most goals conceded away in a season (21 games): 59, Ipswich Town (1994–95)
- Most goals conceded away in a season (19 games): 55, Wigan Athletic (2009–10)
- Scored in every match: Arsenal (2001–02) (38 games)
- Most consecutive matches scored in: 55, Arsenal (19 May 2001 – 30 November 2002)
- Most consecutive away matches scored in: 27, Arsenal
- Most clean sheets in a season: 25, Chelsea (2004–05)
- Fewest clean sheets in a season: 1, Sheffield United (2023–24)
- Most goals scored in total: 2,413, Manchester United
- Most goals conceded in total: 1,684
  - Tottenham Hotspur
  - West Ham United
- Most own goals scored in total: 62, Everton

=== Disciplinary ===
- Most yellow cards in total: 2,171, Chelsea
- Most red cards in total: 113, Everton
- Most yellow cards in a season: 105, Chelsea (2023–24)
- Fewest yellow cards in a season: 12, Coventry City (1993–94)
- Most red cards in a season: 9
  - Sunderland (2009–10)
  - Queens Park Rangers (2011–12)
- Most yellow cards in one match: 14
  - Bournemouth (6) 0–1 Chelsea (8), 14 September 2024
- Most yellow cards for a single team in one game: 9 for Tottenham Hotspur in a 2–2 draw at Chelsea, 2 May 2016
- Most penalties awarded to a team in a season: 14, Manchester United (2019–20)
- Most penalties conceded by a team in a season: 13, Hull City (2016–17)

=== Awards ===
- Most Golden Boot winners: 8
  - Liverpool (1997–98†, 1998–99†, 2013–14, 2017–18, 2018–19 (2)†, 2021–22†, 2024–25)
- Most Golden Glove winners: 7
  - Manchester City (2010–11, 2011–12, 2012–13, 2014–15, 2019–20, 2020–21, 2021–22†)

† Indicates multiple award winners in the same season

=== Attendances ===
- Highest attendance, single match: 83,222, Tottenham Hotspur 1–0 Arsenal (at Wembley Stadium, 10 February 2018)
- Lowest attendance, single match: 3,039, Wimbledon 1–3 Everton (at Selhurst Park, 26 January 1993)
- Highest season average attendance: 75,821 – Old Trafford, Manchester United (2006–07)
- Lowest season average attendance: 8,353 – Selhurst Park, Wimbledon (1992–93)

These figures do not take into account the 2019–20 and 2020–21 seasons, when many matches had an attendance of zero due to public health measures adopted to control the COVID-19 pandemic.

== Player records ==
=== Appearances ===
- Most Premier League appearances: 658, James Milner (10 November 2002 to 24 May 2026)
- Most different clubs played for: 8, Marcus Bent (for Crystal Palace, Blackburn Rovers, Ipswich Town, Leicester City, Everton, Charlton Athletic, Wigan Athletic, and Wolverhampton Wanderers)
- Oldest player: John Burridge, 43 years and 162 days (for Manchester City v. Queens Park Rangers, 14 May 1995)
- Youngest player: **Ethan Nwaneri**, 15 years and 181 days (for Arsenal v. Brentford, 18 September 2022)
- Most consecutive Premier League appearances: 310, Brad Friedel (14 August 2004 until 7 October 2012)
- Most Premier League appearances as a substitute: 218, James Milner
- Most seasons appeared in: 24, James Milner (every season from 2002–03 to 2025–26)

Players currently playing in the Premier League are highlighted in bold.

Most appearances (career)
Rank	Player	Games	Position	First season	Last season
1	(England) James Milner	658	Midfielder	2002–03	2025–26
2	(England) Gareth Barry	653	Midfielder	1997–98	2017–18
3	(Wales) Ryan Giggs	632	Midfielder	1992–93	2013–14
4	(England) Frank Lampard	609	Midfielder	1995–96	2014–15
5	(England) David James	572	Goalkeeper	1992–93	2009–10
6	(Wales) Gary Speed	535	Midfielder	1992–93	2007–08
7	(England) Emile Heskey	516	Forward	1994–95	2011–12
8	(Australia) Mark Schwarzer	514	Goalkeeper	1996–97	2014–15
9	(England) Jamie Carragher	508	Defender	1996–97	2012–13
10	(England) Phil Neville	505	Defender	1994–95	2012–13

=== Goalscoring ===
- First Premier League goal: Brian Deane (for Sheffield United v. Manchester United, 15 August 1992)
- Most Premier League goals: 260, Alan Shearer
- Most Premier League goals at one club: 213, Harry Kane (for Tottenham Hotspur)
- Oldest goalscorer: 40 years and 268 days, Teddy Sheringham (for West Ham United v. Portsmouth, 26 December 2006)
- Youngest goalscorer: 16 years and 73 days, **Max Dowman** (for Arsenal v. Everton, 14 March 2026)
- Most consecutive Premier League matches scored in: 11, Jamie Vardy (for Leicester City, 29 August – 28 November 2015)
- Most consecutive home Premier League matches scored in: 15, Alan Shearer (for Newcastle United, 21 August 1996 – 11 May 1997)
- Most consecutive away Premier League matches scored in: 9, Robin van Persie (for Arsenal, 1 January – 22 May 2011)

Players currently playing in the Premier League are highlighted in bold.

Most goals (career)
Rank	Player	Goals	Games	Ratio	Position	First goal	Last goal
1	(England) Alan Shearer	260	441	0.59	Forward	1992–93	2005–06
2	(England) Harry Kane	213	320	0.67	Forward	2013–14	2022–23
3	(England) Wayne Rooney	208	491	0.42	Forward	2002–03	2017–18
4	(Egypt) Mohamed Salah	193	328	0.59	Forward	2013–14	2025–26
5	(England) Andy Cole	187	414	0.45	Forward	1993–94	2006–07
6	(Argentina) Sergio Agüero	184	275	0.67	Forward	2011–12	2020–21
7	(England) Frank Lampard	177	609	0.29	Midfielder	1997–98	2014–15
8	(France) Thierry Henry	175	258	0.68	Forward	1999–2000	2011–12
9	(England) Robbie Fowler	163	379	0.43	Forward	1993–94	2006–07
10	(England) Jermain Defoe	162	496	0.33	Forward	2001–02	2017–18

- Most goals in a season: 36, **Erling Haaland** (Manchester City, 2022–23)
- Most matches scored in during a Premier League season: 26
  - Andy Cole (Newcastle United, 1993–94)
  - Harry Kane (Tottenham Hotspur, 2022–23)
- Most Premier League goals in a calendar year: 39, Harry Kane (Tottenham Hotspur, 2017)
- Most Premier League teams scored against: 39, Frank Lampard
- Number of teams scored against in a season: 17
  - 20-team league:
    - Ian Wright (Arsenal, 1996–97)
    - Robin van Persie (Arsenal, 2011–12)
    - Mohamed Salah (Liverpool, 2017–18, 2024–25)
  - 22-team league:
    - Andy Cole (Newcastle United, 1993–94)
    - Alan Shearer (Blackburn Rovers, 1994–95)
- Fastest goal: 7.69 seconds, Shane Long (for Southampton v. Watford, 23 April 2019)
- Fastest goal on Premier League debut: 28 seconds, Odsonne Édouard (for Crystal Palace v. Tottenham Hotspur, 11 September 2021)
- Latest goal: 103rd minute, Oli McBurnie (for Sheffield United v. West Ham United, 21 January 2024)
- Most seasons scored in: 21, Ryan Giggs (every season from 1992–93 to 2012–13)
- Most consecutive seasons to score at least 30 goals: 3, Alan Shearer (1993–1996 for Blackburn Rovers)
- Most consecutive seasons to score at least 25 goals: 4, Alan Shearer (1993–1996 for Blackburn Rovers, 1996–1997 for Newcastle United)
- Most consecutive seasons to score at least 20 goals: 5
  - Thierry Henry (2001–2006 for Arsenal)
  - Sergio Agüero (2014–2019 for Manchester City)
- Most consecutive seasons to score at least 15 goals: 9, Harry Kane (2014–2023 for Tottenham Hotspur)
- Most consecutive seasons to score at least 10 goals: 11, Wayne Rooney (2004–2015 for Manchester United)
- Most consecutive seasons to score at least 1 goal: 21, Ryan Giggs (1992–2013 for Manchester United)
- Most different clubs to score for: 7, Craig Bellamy (for Coventry City, Newcastle United, Blackburn Rovers, Liverpool, West Ham United, Manchester City, Cardiff City)
- Most scored from headers: 53, Peter Crouch
- Most scored from outside the box: 41, Frank Lampard
- Most goals scored as a substitute in a single season: 8, Adam Le Fondre (Reading, 2012–13)
- Most goals scored as a teenager in their debut season: 13, Eli Junior Kroupi (Bournemouth, 2025-26)
- Most own goals: 10, Richard Dunne
- Most own goals in a season: 4
  - Martin Škrtel (Liverpool, 2013–14)
  - **Lewis Dunk** (Brighton & Hove Albion, 2017–18)
- Most goals in a calendar month: 10 (December 2013), Luis Suárez (Liverpool)

==== Penalties ====
- Most penalties scored: 56, Alan Shearer
- Most penalties missed: 11
  - Alan Shearer
  - Wayne Rooney
- Oldest penalty goalscorer: 39 years and 239 days, James Milner (for Brighton & Hove Albion v. Manchester City, 31 August 2025)

Most penalties scored (career)
Rank	Player	Scored	Taken	Ratio	Playing position
1	(England) Alan Shearer	56	67	0.84	Forward
2	(England) Frank Lampard	43	50	0.86	Midfielder
3	(Egypt) Mohamed Salah	35	41	0.85	Forward
4	(England) Harry Kane	33	37	0.89	Forward
5	(England) Steven Gerrard	32	41	0.78	Midfielder
6	(England) Mark Noble	28	33	0.85	Midfielder
7	(Argentina) Sergio Agüero	27	33	0.82	Forward
7	(England) Jamie Vardy	27	34	0.79	Forward
9	(England) Matt Le Tissier	25	26	0.96	Midfielder
9	(Portugal) **Bruno Fernandes**	25	31	0.81	Midfielder

==== Free kicks ====
Most direct free kick goals scored (career)
Rank	Player	Goals	Games	Ratio	Playing position
1	(England) David Beckham	18	265	0.068	Midfielder
2	(England) James Ward-Prowse	17	422	0.040	Midfielder
3	(Italy) Gianfranco Zola	12	229	0.052	Forward
3	(Portugal) Cristiano Ronaldo	12	236	0.051	Forward
3	(France) Thierry Henry	12	258	0.047	Forward
6	(France) Laurent Robert	11	150	0.073	Forward
6	(Sweden) Sebastian Larsson	11	282	0.039	Midfielder
8	(Republic of Ireland) Ian Harte	10	237	0.042	Defender
8	(Norway) Morten Gamst Pedersen	10	260	0.038	Midfielder
10	(England) **James Maddison**	9	225	0.040	Midfielder
10	(England) Jamie Redknapp	9	295	0.031	Midfielder
10	(Peru) Nolberto Solano	9	302	0.030	Midfielder
10	(England) Frank Lampard	9	609	0.015	Midfielder

==== Hat-tricks & multiple goal records ====
- Most Premier League hat-tricks: 12, Sergio Agüero
- Most Premier League hat-tricks in a season: 5, Alan Shearer (Blackburn Rovers, 1995–96)
- Youngest player to score a Premier League hat-trick: 18 years and 62 days, Michael Owen (Sheffield Wednesday 3–3 Liverpool, 14 February 1998)
- Oldest player to score a Premier League hat-trick: 37 years and 146 days, Teddy Sheringham (Portsmouth 4–0 Bolton Wanderers, 26 August 2003)
- Most goals in a match: 5
  - Andy Cole (Manchester United 9–0 Ipswich Town, 4 March 1995)
  - Alan Shearer (Newcastle United 8–0 Sheffield Wednesday, 19 September 1999)
  - Jermain Defoe (Tottenham Hotspur 9–1 Wigan Athletic, 22 November 2009)
  - Dimitar Berbatov (Manchester United 7–1 Blackburn Rovers, 27 November 2010)
  - Sergio Agüero (Manchester City 6–1 Newcastle United, 3 October 2015)
- Most hat-tricks against a single club: 3, Luis Suárez (Liverpool v. Norwich City)
- Fastest Premier League hat-trick: 2 minutes 56 seconds, Sadio Mané (Southampton 6–1 Aston Villa, 16 May 2015)
- Most goals in one half: 5, Jermain Defoe (Tottenham Hotspur 9–1 Wigan Athletic, 22 November 2009)
- Most goals scored by a substitute in a match: 4, Ole Gunnar Solskjær (Nottingham Forest 1–8 Manchester United, 6 February 1999)
- Most consecutive Premier League goal-scoring appearances by a player against a single opponent: 9, Sadio Mané (Liverpool v. Crystal Palace, 19 August 2017 to 18 September 2021)
- Most own goals scored by a player in a match: 2
  - Jamie Carragher (Liverpool player; Liverpool 2–3 Manchester United, 11 September 1999)
  - Michael Proctor (Sunderland player; Sunderland 1–3 Charlton Athletic, 1 February 2003)
  - Jonathan Walters (Stoke City player; Stoke City 0–4 Chelsea, 12 January 2013)
  - Wout Faes (Leicester City player; Liverpool 2–1 Leicester City, 30 December 2022)
  - Craig Dawson (Wolverhampton Wanderers player; Everton 4–0 Wolverhampton Wanderers, 4 December 2024)
  - Maxime Estève (Burnley player; Manchester City 5–1 Burnley, 27 September 2025)

=== Assists ===
Players currently playing in the Premier League are highlighted in bold.

Most assists (career)
Rank	Player	Assists	Games	Ratio	Position	First assist	Last assist
1	(Wales) Ryan Giggs	162	632	0.26	Midfielder	1992–93	2012–13
2	(Belgium) Kevin De Bruyne	119	288	0.41	Midfielder	2013–14	2024–25
3	(Spain) Cesc Fàbregas	111	350	0.32	Midfielder	2004–05	2017–18
4	(England) Wayne Rooney	103	491	0.21	Forward	2002–03	2017–18
5	(England) Frank Lampard	102	609	0.17	Midfielder	1997–98	2014–15
6	(Netherlands) Dennis Bergkamp	94	315	0.30	Forward	1995–96	2005–06
6	(Egypt) Mohamed Salah	94	328	0.29	Forward	2013–14	2025–26
8	(Spain) David Silva	93	309	0.30	Midfielder	2010–11	2019–20
9	(England) Steven Gerrard	92	504	0.18	Midfielder	1999–2000	2014–15
10	(England) James Milner	90	658	0.14	Midfielder	2004–05	2025–26

- Only player with 20+ goals and 20+ assists in a season: Thierry Henry (24 goals, 20 assists, 2002-03)
- Most Premier League assists in a season: 21, **Bruno Fernandes** (Manchester United, 2025–26)
- Quickest player to reach 50 assists: Kevin De Bruyne, 123 matches
- Most consecutive Premier League matches with an assist: 7, Mesut Özil (for Arsenal, 26 September – 21 November 2015)
- Most assists from one player to another: 24
  - Frank Lampard to Didier Drogba
  - Harry Kane to Son Heung-min
- Most goals/assists between two players: 47, Harry Kane and Son Heung-min
- Most goals/assists between two players in a season: 14, Harry Kane and Son Heung-min (Tottenham Hotspur, 2020–21)
- Most individual assist givers in one match for the same team: 7, Crystal Palace 0–7 Liverpool (19 December 2020)
- Most assists in a single Premier League match: 4
  - Dennis Bergkamp (Arsenal 5–0 Leicester City, 20 February 1999)
  - José Antonio Reyes (Arsenal 7–0 Middlesbrough, 14 January 2006)
  - Cesc Fàbregas (Arsenal 6–2 Blackburn Rovers, 4 October 2009)
  - Emmanuel Adebayor (Tottenham Hotspur 5–0 Newcastle United, 11 February 2012)
  - Santi Cazorla (Arsenal 4–1 Wigan Athletic, 14 May 2013)
  - Dušan Tadić (Southampton 8–0 Sunderland, 18 October 2014)
  - Harry Kane (Southampton 2–5 Tottenham Hotspur, 20 September 2020) – only instance in which all four assists were to a single player (Son Heung-min)
  - Paul Pogba (Manchester United 5–1 Leeds United, 14 August 2021)
  - **Jérémy Doku** (Manchester City 6–1 Bournemouth, 4 November 2023)

=== Goalkeepers ===
Players currently playing in the Premier League are highlighted in bold.

Most clean sheets (career)
Rank	Player	Clean sheets	Games	Ratio	First season	Last season
1	(Czech Republic) Petr Čech	202	443	0.46	2004–05	2018–19
2	(England) David James	169	572	0.30	1992–93	2009–10
3	(Australia) Mark Schwarzer	152	514	0.30	1996–97	2014–15
4	(Spain) David de Gea	147	415	0.35	2011–12	2022–23
5	(England) David Seaman	141	344	0.41	1992–93	2003–04
6	(England) Nigel Martyn	137	372	0.37	1992–93	2005–06
7	(Spain) Pepe Reina	136	297	0.46	2005–06	2019–20
8	(Netherlands) Edwin van der Sar	132	313	0.42	2001–02	2010–11
8	(United States) Tim Howard	132	399	0.33	2003–04	2015–16
8	(United States) Brad Friedel	132	450	0.29	1997–98	2013–14

- Most Premier League clean sheets (career): 202, Petr Čech
- Most clean sheets in one season: 24, Petr Čech (for Chelsea, 2004–05)
- Longest consecutive run without conceding a goal: 14 matches (1,311 minutes), Edwin van der Sar (for Manchester United, 2008–09)
- Most clean sheets at one club: 162, Petr Čech (for Chelsea)
- Most penalties saved: 13, David James
- Most assists by a goalkeeper: 7, Ederson (for Manchester City).
- Goalscoring goalkeepers (excluding own goals):
  - Peter Schmeichel (Everton 3–2 Aston Villa, 20 October 2001)
  - Brad Friedel (Charlton Athletic 3–2 Blackburn Rovers, 21 February 2004)
  - Paul Robinson (Tottenham Hotspur 3–1 Watford, 17 March 2007)
  - Tim Howard (Everton 1–2 Bolton Wanderers, 4 January 2012)
  - Asmir Begović (Stoke City 1–1 Southampton, 2 November 2013)
  - **Alisson** (West Bromwich Albion 1–2 Liverpool, 16 May 2021)

=== Disciplinary ===
- Most red cards for a player: 8
  - Richard Dunne
  - Duncan Ferguson
  - Patrick Vieira
- Most red cards in a season: 3
  - Vinnie Jones (Wimbledon, 1995–96)
  - Slaven Bilić (Everton, 1997–98)
  - David Batty (Newcastle United, 1997–98)
  - Craig Short (Blackburn Rovers, 2001–02)
  - Franck Queudrue (Middlesbrough, 2002–03)
  - Wes Brown (Sunderland, 2013–14)
  - Victor Wanyama (Southampton, 2015–16)
- Most yellow cards for a player: 123, Gareth Barry
- Most yellow cards in a season: 14
  - Mark Hughes (Southampton, 1998–99)
  - Robbie Savage (Leicester City, 2001–02)
  - Cheick Tioté (Newcastle United, 2010–11)
  - Lee Cattermole (Sunderland, 2014–15)
  - José Holebas (Watford, 2016–17)
  - Étienne Capoue (Watford, 2018–19)
  - João Palhinha (Fulham, 2022–23)
- Most fouls: 633, Gareth Barry (since 2006–07, the first season for which reliable records are available)
- Most penalties conceded in a season: 5, David Luiz (Arsenal, 2019–20)
- Longest ban: 12 matches, Joey Barton – after being dismissed for violent conduct against Manchester City on 13 May 2012, Barton was found guilty of two further separate counts of violent conduct
- Fastest booking: 24 seconds, Scott McTominay (for Manchester United v. Newcastle United, 26 December 2019)
- Most appearances without a booking: 201, John Barnes

=== Awards ===
- Most Premier League winner's medals: 13
  - Ryan Giggs (1992–93, 1993–94, 1995–96, 1996–97, 1998–99, 1999–2000, 2000–01, 2002–03, 2006–07, 2007–08, 2008–09, 2010–11, 2012–13)
- Most Player of the Season awards: 2
  - Thierry Henry (2003–04 and 2005–06)
  - Cristiano Ronaldo (2006–07 and 2007–08)
  - Nemanja Vidić (2008–09 and 2010–11)
  - Kevin De Bruyne (2019–20 and 2021–22)
  - Mohamed Salah (2017–18 and 2024–25)
- Most Player of the Month awards: 7
  - Sergio Agüero (October 2013, November 2014, January 2016, April 2016, January 2018, February 2019, January 2020)
  - Harry Kane (January 2015, February 2015, March 2016, February 2017, September 2017, December 2017, March 2022)
  - Mohamed Salah (November 2017, February 2018, March 2018, October 2021, October 2023, November 2024, February 2025)
- Most Golden Boot Awards: 4
  - Thierry Henry (2001–02, 2003–04, 2004–05, 2005–06)
  - Mohamed Salah (2017–18, 2018–19, 2021–22, 2024–25)
- Most Playmaker Awards: 3
  - Kevin De Bruyne (2017–18, 2019–20, 2022–23)
- Most Golden Glove Awards: 4
  - Joe Hart (2010–11, 2011–12, 2012–13, 2014–15)
  - Petr Čech (2004–05, 2009–10, 2013–14, 2015–16)

== Match records ==
=== Scorelines ===
- Biggest home win: 9–0
  - Manchester United 9–0 Ipswich Town (4 March 1995)
  - Manchester United 9–0 Southampton (2 February 2021)
  - Liverpool 9–0 Bournemouth (27 August 2022)
- Biggest away win: 9–0
  - Southampton 0–9 Leicester City (25 October 2019)
- Biggest aggregate win: 12 goals
  - Manchester City 8–0 Watford (21 September 2019) and Watford 0–4 Manchester City (21 July 2020)
  - Sheffield United 0–8 Newcastle United (24 September 2023) and Newcastle United 5–1 Sheffield United (27 April 2024)
- Biggest loss by reigning champions: 5 goals
  - Coventry City 5–0 Blackburn Rovers (9 December 1995), after Blackburn Rovers won the 1994–95 season
  - Newcastle United 5–0 Manchester United (20 October 1996), after Manchester United won the 1995–96 season
  - Chelsea 5–0 Manchester United (3 October 1999), after Manchester United won the 1998–99 season
  - Manchester United 1–6 Manchester City (23 October 2011), after Manchester United won the 2010–11 season
  - Leicester City 1–6 Tottenham Hotspur (18 May 2017), after Leicester City won the 2015–16 season
  - Aston Villa 7–2 Liverpool (4 October 2020), after Liverpool won the 2019–20 season
- Largest goal deficit overcome to win: 3
  - Leeds United 4–3 Derby County (8 November 1997)
  - West Ham United 3–4 Wimbledon (9 September 1998)
  - Tottenham Hotspur 3–5 Manchester United (29 September 2001)
  - Wolverhampton Wanderers 4–3 Leicester City (25 October 2003)
  - Bournemouth 4–3 Luton Town (13 March 2024)
- Largest goal deficit overcome to draw: 4, Newcastle United 4–4 Arsenal (5 February 2011), with Newcastle United scoring last
- Highest scoring: 7–4, Portsmouth v. Reading (29 September 2007)
- Highest scoring draw: 5–5, West Bromwich Albion v. Manchester United (19 May 2013)
- Highest scoring in the first half: 7 goals
  - Blackburn Rovers 3–4 Leeds United (14 September 1997 – final score: 3–4)
  - Bradford City 4–3 Derby County (21 April 2000 – final score: 4–4)
  - Reading 3–4 Manchester United (1 December 2012 – final score: 3–4)
  - West Ham 2–5 Arsenal (30 November 2024 – final score: 2–5)
- Highest scoring in the second half: 9 goals, Tottenham Hotspur 9–1 Wigan Athletic (22 November 2009 – first half score: 1–0)
- Most individual goal scorers in one match: 9
  - Portsmouth 7–4 Reading (29 September 2007)
- Most individual goal scorers in one match for the same team: 8
  - Manchester United 9–0 Southampton (2 February 2021)
  - Sheffield United 0–8 Newcastle United (24 September 2023)

== All-time Premier League table ==
The all-time Premier League table is a cumulative record of all match results, points and goals of every team that has played in the Premier League since its inception in 1992. The table that follows is accurate as of the end of the 2025–26 season. Teams in bold are part of the 2026–27 Premier League. Numbers in bold are the record (highest either positive or negative) numbers in each column.

Pos.	Club	Seasons	Pld	W	D	L	GF	GA	GD	Pts	PPG	1st	2nd	3rd	4th	5th	6th	7th	T4	T7	Debut	Since/Last app.	Relegated	Best Pos.
1	**Manchester United**	**34**	**1,304**	**775**	289	240	**2,413**	1,271	**+1,142**	**2,614**	**2.009**	**13**	7	6	1	1	3	1	**27**	**32**	1992–93	1992–93 (Note: In the top division since the 1975–76 season)		**1**
2	**Arsenal**	**34**	**1,304**	719	316	269	2,336	1,281	+1,055	2,473	1.886	4	**9**	5	**7**	4	1		25	30	1992–93	1992–93 (Note: In the top division since the 1919–20 season)		**1**
3	**Liverpool**	**34**	**1,304**	694	320	290	2,331	1,329	+1,002	2,402	1.850	2	5	**7**	**7**	4	3	3	21	31	1992–93	1992–93 (Note: In the top division since the 1962–63 season)		**1**
4	**Chelsea**	**34**	**1,304**	681	323	300	2,210	1,330	+880	2,366	1.828	5	4	6	5	2	5		20	27	1992–93	1992–93 (Note: In the top division since the 1989–90 season)		**1**
5	**Tottenham Hotspur**	**34**	**1,304**	561	309	434	2,000	**1,684**	+316	1,992	1.541		1	2	4	**6**	2	2	7	17	1992–93	1992–93 (Note: In the top division since the 1978–79 season)		2
6	**Manchester City**	29	1,114	573	239	302	1,997	1,214	+783	1,958	1.747	8	4	3	1	1			16	17	1992–93	2002–03	2	**1**
7	**Everton**	**34**	**1,304**	463	**366**	475	1,654	1,683	−29	1,747 (Note: Everton deducted 8 points for breaking profit and sustainability rules in November 2023 and April 2024)	1.341				1	3	3	**4**	1	11	1992–93	1992–93 (Note: In the top division since the 1954–55 season)		4
8	**Newcastle United**	31	1,186	453	297	436	1,651	1,614	+27	1,656	1.400		2	2	2	3	1	2	6	12	1993–94	2017–18	2	2
9	**Aston Villa**	31	1,190	430	328	432	1,506	1,560	−54	1,618	1.348		1		3	1	**7**	2	4	14	1992–93	2019–20	1	2
10	West Ham United	30	1,110	381	289	**478**	1,429	**1,684**	−255	1,393	1.255					1	1	3		5	1993–94	2025–26	3	5
11	Southampton	25	962	282	254	426	1,140	1,441	**−301**	1,100	1.154						1	1		2	1992–93	2024–25	3	6
12	Blackburn Rovers	18	696	262	184	250	927	907	+20	970	1.394	1	1		1		3	2	3	8	1992–93	2011–12	2	**1**
13	**Leeds United**	16	620	234	165	221	842	840	+2	867	1.409			1	2	4			3	7	1992–93	2025–26	2	3
14	Leicester City	18	688	224	174	290	904	1,016	−112	846	1.230	1				2			1	3	1994–95	2024–25	5	**1**
15	**Fulham**	19	722	220	185	317	842	1,050	−208	845	1.159							1		1	2001–02	2022–23	3	7
16	**Crystal Palace**	17	654	193	177	284	736	935	−199	756	1.154										1992–93	2013–14	4	10
17	**Sunderland**	17	646	167	171	308	654	952	−298	672	1.040							3		3	1996–97	2025–26	4	7
18	Middlesbrough	15	574	165	169	240	648	794	−146	661 (Note: Middlesbrough deducted 3 points for failure to fulfil a fixture at Blackburn Rovers on 21 December 1996)	1.152							1		1	1992–93	2016–17	4	7
19	Bolton Wanderers	13	494	149	128	217	575	745	−170	575	1.164						1	1		2	1995–96	2011–12	3	6
20	Wolverhampton Wanderers	12	456	129	110	217	490	722	−232	497	1.090							2		2	2003–04	2025–26	3	7
21	West Bromwich Albion	13	494	117	139	238	510	772	−262	490	0.992										2002–03	2020–21	5	8
22	Stoke City	10	380	116	109	155	398	525	−127	457	1.203										2008–09	2017–18	1	9
23	**Brighton & Hove Albion**	9	342	108	109	123	435	478	−43	433	1.250						1			1	2017–18	2017–18		6
24	**Nottingham Forest**	9	350	108	98	144	422	519	−97	418 (Note: Nottingham Forest deducted 4 points for breaking profit and sustainability rules in March 2024)	1.199			1				1	1	2	1992–93	2022–23	3	3
25	**Bournemouth**	9	342	108	87	147	448	568	−120	411	1.164						1			1	2015–16	2022–23	1	6
26	**Coventry City**	9	354	99	112	143	387	490	−103	409	1.155										1992–93	2026–27	1	11
27	Norwich City	10	392	99	105	188	414	669	−255	402	1.026			1					1	1	1992–93	2021–22	**6**	3
28	Sheffield Wednesday	8	316	101	89	126	409	453	−44	392	1.241							3		3	1992–93	1999–2000	1	7
29	Wimbledon (Note: Became Milton Keynes Dons)	8	316	99	94	123	384	472	−88	391	1.237						1			1	1992–93	1999–2000	1	6
30	Burnley	10	380	92	95	193	379	608	−229	371	1.020							1		1	2009–10	2025–26	5	7
31	Charlton Athletic	8	304	93	82	129	342	442	−100	361	1.188							1		1	1998–99	2006–07	2	7
32	Wigan Athletic	8	304	85	76	143	316	482	−166	331	1.089										2005–06	2012–13	1	10
33	Swansea City	7	266	82	66	118	306	383	−77	312	1.173										2011–12	2017–18	1	8
34	Queens Park Rangers	7	278	81	65	132	339	431	−92	308	1.108					1				1	1992–93	2014–15	3	5
35	Birmingham City	7	266	73	82	111	273	360	−87	301	1.132										2002–03	2010–11	3	9
36	Portsmouth	7	266	79	65	122	292	380	−88	293 (Note: Portsmouth deducted 9 points for entering administration in March 2010)	1.102										2003–04	2009–10	1	8
37	Watford	8	304	73	66	165	310	518	−208	285	0.938										1999–2000	2021–22	4	11
38	Derby County	7	266	68	70	128	271	420	−149	274	1.030										1996–97	2007–08	2	8
39	**Brentford**	5	190	68	49	73	283	276	+7	253	1.316										2021–22	2021–22		9
40	**Ipswich Town**	6	240	61	63	116	255	394	−139	246	1.025					1				1	1992–93	2026–27	3	5
41	Sheffield United	6	236	56	57	123	222	374	−152	225	0.953										1992–93	2023–24	4	9
42	**Hull City**	5	190	41	48	101	181	323	−142	171	0.900										2008–09	2026–27	3	16
43	Reading	3	114	32	23	59	136	186	−50	119	1.044										2006–07	2012–13	2	8
44	Oldham Athletic	2	84	22	23	39	105	142	−37	89	1.060										1992–93	1993–94	1	19
45	Cardiff City	2	76	17	13	46	66	143	−77	64	0.842										2013–14	2018–19	2	18
46	Bradford City	2	76	14	20	42	68	138	−70	62	0.816										1999–2000	2000–01	1	17
47	Huddersfield Town	2	76	12	17	47	50	134	−84	53	0.697										2017–18	2018–19	1	16
48	Blackpool	1	38	10	9	19	55	78	−23	39	1.026										2010–11	2010–11	1	19
49	Barnsley	1	38	10	5	23	37	82	−45	35	0.921										1997–98	1997–98	1	19
50	Swindon Town	1	42	**5**	15	22	47	100	−53	30	0.714										1993–94	1993–94	1	22
51	Luton Town	1	38	6	8	24	52	85	−33	**26**	**0.684**										2023–24	2023–24	1	18

League or status at 2026–27:

2026–27 Premier League teams
2026–27 EFL Championship teams
2026–27 EFL League One teams
2026–27 EFL League Two teams
Defunct teams

== Manager records ==
- Most Premier League titles: 13, Sir Alex Ferguson (Manchester United) – 1993, 1994, 1996, 1997, 1999, 2000, 2001, 2003, 2007, 2008, 2009, 2011, 2013
- Most Premier League Manager of the Season award: 11, Sir Alex Ferguson (Manchester United; 1993–94, 1995–96, 1996–97, 1998–99, 1999–2000, 2002–03, 2006–07, 2007–08, 2008–09, 2010–11 and 2012–13).
- Most Premier League Manager of the Month awards: 27, Sir Alex Ferguson
- Most consecutive Premier League Manager of the Month awards: 4, Pep Guardiola
- Most Premier League Manager of the Month awards in a single season: 5, Jürgen Klopp (2019–20)
- Most promotions to the Premier League: 4, Steve Bruce (Birmingham City in 2001–02 and 2006–07 and Hull City in 2012–13 and 2015–16)
- Most relegations from the Premier League: 3, Dave Bassett (Sheffield United in 1993–94, Nottingham Forest in 1996–97, and Leicester City in 2001–02)
- Most clubs managed: 9, Sam Allardyce (Bolton Wanderers, Newcastle United, Blackburn Rovers, West Ham United, Sunderland, Crystal Palace, Everton, West Bromwich Albion, Leeds United)
- Quickest to reach 50 Premier League wins: José Mourinho, 63 Games
- Quickest to reach 100 Premier League wins: Pep Guardiola, 134 games
- Longest spell as manager: 21 years, 224 days, Arsène Wenger (Arsenal, 1 October 1996 – 13 May 2018)
- Shortest spell as manager (excluding caretakers):
  - Fewest days: 30 days, Sam Allardyce (Leeds United, 3 May – 2 June 2023)
  - Fewest games: 4 games
    - Frank de Boer (Crystal Palace, 26 June – 10 September 2017)
    - Sam Allardyce (Leeds United, 3 May – 2 June 2023)
- Oldest manager: Roy Hodgson, 76 years, 187 days (for Crystal Palace v. Chelsea, 12 February 2024)
- Youngest manager: Ryan Mason, 29 years, 312 days (for Tottenham Hotspur v. Southampton, 21 April 2021)
