= 2007–08 Premier League =

Football season in England

Premier League
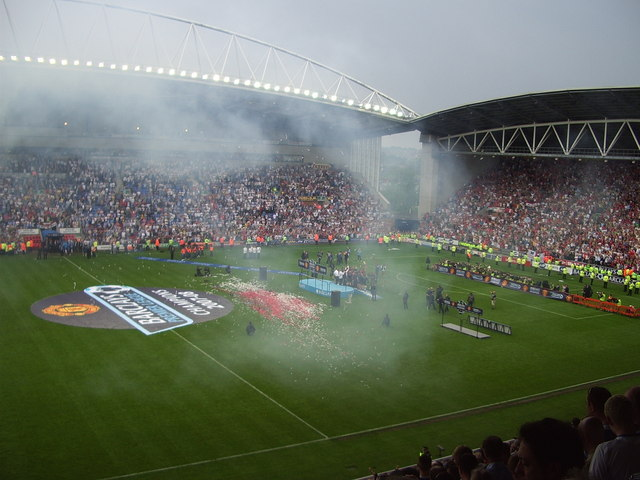
- Manchester United celebrating their 10th Premier League title following their win at Wigan
- Season: 2007–08
- Dates: 11 August 2007 – 11 May 2008
- Champions: Manchester United; 10th Premier League title 17th English title
- Relegated: Reading; Birmingham City; Derby County
- Champions League: Manchester United; Chelsea; Arsenal; Liverpool
- UEFA Cup: Portsmouth; Everton; Tottenham Hotspur; Manchester City (through UEFA Respect Fair Play ranking)
- Intertoto Cup: Aston Villa
- Matches: 380
- Goals: 1,002 (2.64 per match)
- Top goalscorer: Cristiano Ronaldo (31 goals)
- Best goalkeeper: Pepe Reina (18 clean sheets)
- Biggest home win: Middlesbrough 8–1 Manchester City (11 May 2008)
- Biggest away win: Derby County 0–6 Aston Villa (12 April 2008)
- Highest scoring: Portsmouth 7–4 Reading (29 September 2007)
- Longest winning run: 8 games Manchester United
- Longest unbeaten run: 21 games Chelsea
- Longest winless run: 32 games Derby County
- Longest losing run: 8 games Reading; Wigan Athletic
- Highest attendance: 76,013; Manchester United 4–1 West Ham United (3 May 2008)
- Lowest attendance: 14,007; Wigan Athletic 1–0 Middlesbrough (15 August 2007)
- Total attendance: 13,708,885
- Average attendance: 36,076

The 2007–08 Premier League (known as the Barclays Premier League for sponsorship reasons) season was the 16th since its establishment. The first matches of the season were played on 11 August 2007, and the season ended on 11 May 2008. Manchester United went into the 2007–08 season as the Premier League's defending champions, having won their ninth Premier League title and sixteenth league championship overall the previous season. This season was also the third consecutive season to see the "Big Four" continue their stranglehold on the top four spots (which mean UEFA Champions League qualification).

== Overview ==
The first goal of the season was scored by Michael Chopra, who scored a 94th-minute winner for Sunderland against Tottenham in the early kick-off. The first red card of the season was given to Reading's Dave Kitson after a challenge on Patrice Evra in their opening game against Manchester United. The first hat-trick was scored by Emmanuel Adebayor in the match between Arsenal and Derby County.

On 29 September 2007, Portsmouth and Reading played the highest-scoring match in Premier League history, in which Portsmouth won 7–4. On 15 December 2007, both Roque Santa Cruz (Blackburn Rovers) and Marcus Bent (Wigan Athletic) scored hat-tricks during Wigan's 5–3 home win over Blackburn. This was the first occasion in Premier League history that two players on opposing teams had scored hat-tricks during the same match.

Manchester United successfully defended their title, winning tenth Premier League on the final day with a 2–0 win over Wigan Athletic, while second-placed Chelsea drew 1–1 with Bolton Wanderers. It was their seventeenth English title overall, with the club just one title behind their rivals Liverpool's total of 18. Elsewhere on the final day, Middlesbrough thrashed Manchester City 8–1 to claim the biggest win of the season.

On 29 March 2008, Derby County drew 2–2 with Fulham while Birmingham City, who were 17th in the table at the time, beat Manchester City 3–1, to make Derby County the first team in Premier League history to be relegated in March. Throughout the season, the team won just one game and recorded only 11 points, the lowest tally in top flight history. On the final day of the season, Reading beat Derby 4–0 and Birmingham City beat Blackburn Rovers 4–1. However, Fulham's 1–0 win over Portsmouth sent both teams down as the London club avoided the drop on goal difference.

The season was notable for the return of the English league to the top of UEFA's official ranking list, overtaking La Liga for the period from 1 May 2008 to 30 April 2009. This followed the success of English clubs in the UEFA Champions League, with both champions Manchester United and runners-up Chelsea reaching the final. This was the first time that the English league had topped the UEFA rankings since the Heysel Stadium disaster in 1985.

== Teams ==
Twenty teams competed in the league – the top seventeen teams from the previous season and the three teams promoted from the Championship. The promoted teams were Sunderland, Birmingham City (both teams returning after a season's absence), and Derby County (returning after a five-year absence). They replaced Sheffield United, Charlton Athletic and Watford. The previous season had seen Sheffield United and Watford both suffer an immediate return to the Championship, while Charlton Athletic were relegated after a seven-year top flight spell.

=== Stadiums and locations ===
Locations of the 2007–08 Premier League teams
Greater London Premier League football clubs
Greater Manchester Premier League football clubs

| Team | Location | Stadium | Capacity |
|---|---|---|---|
| Arsenal | London (Holloway) | Emirates Stadium | 60,355 |
| Aston Villa | Birmingham (Aston) | Villa Park | 42,640 |
| Birmingham City | Birmingham (Bordesley) | St Andrew's Stadium | 30,009 |
| Blackburn Rovers | Blackburn | Ewood Park | 31,367 |
| Bolton Wanderers | Bolton | Reebok Stadium | 28,723 |
| Chelsea | London (Fulham) | Stamford Bridge | 42,055 |
| Derby County | Derby | Pride Park Stadium | 33,597 |
| Everton | Liverpool (Walton) | Goodison Park | 40,157 |
| Fulham | London (Fulham) | Craven Cottage | 26,300 |
| Liverpool | Liverpool (Anfield) | Anfield | 45,276 |
| Manchester City | Manchester (Bradford) | City of Manchester Stadium | 47,726 |
| Manchester United | Manchester (Old Trafford) | Old Trafford | 76,212 |
| Middlesbrough | Middlesbrough | Riverside Stadium | 35,049 |
| Newcastle United | Newcastle upon Tyne | St James' Park | 52,387 |
| Portsmouth | Portsmouth | Fratton Park | 20,688 |
| Reading | Reading | Madejski Stadium | 24,161 |
| Sunderland | Sunderland | Stadium of Light | 49,000 |
| Tottenham Hotspur | London (Tottenham) | White Hart Lane | 36,244 |
| West Ham United | London (Upton Park) | Upton Park | 35,303 |
| Wigan Athletic | Wigan | JJB Stadium | 25,138 |

=== Personnel and kits ===
| Team | Manager | Captain | Kit manufacturer | Shirt sponsor |
|---|---|---|---|---|
| Arsenal | (France) Arsène Wenger | (France) William Gallas | Nike | Emirates |
| Aston Villa | (Northern Ireland) Martin O'Neill | (England) Gareth Barry | Nike | 32red |
| Birmingham City | (Scotland) Alex McLeish | (Northern Ireland) Damien Johnson | Umbro | F&C Investments |
| Blackburn Rovers | (Wales) Mark Hughes | (New Zealand) Ryan Nelsen | Umbro | Bet 24 |
| Bolton Wanderers | (England) Gary Megson | (England) Kevin Davies | Reebok | Reebok |
| Chelsea | (Israel) Avram Grant | (England) John Terry | Adidas | Samsung Mobile |
| Derby County | (England) Paul Jewell | (Wales) Robbie Savage | Adidas | Derbyshire Building Society |
| Everton | (Scotland) David Moyes | (England) Phil Neville | Umbro | Chang Beer |
| Fulham | (England) Roy Hodgson | (United States) Brian McBride | Nike | LG |
| Liverpool | (Spain) Rafael Benítez | (England) Steven Gerrard | Adidas | Carlsberg |
| Manchester City | (Sweden) Sven-Göran Eriksson | (Republic of Ireland) Richard Dunne | Le Coq Sportif | Thomas Cook.com |
| Manchester United | (Scotland) Sir Alex Ferguson | (England) Gary Neville | Nike | AIG |
| Middlesbrough | (England) Gareth Southgate | (Netherlands) George Boateng | Erreà | Garmin |
| Newcastle United | (England) Kevin Keegan | (England) Nicky Butt | Adidas | Northern Rock |
| Portsmouth | (England) Harry Redknapp | (England) Sol Campbell | Canterbury | Oki |
| Reading | (England) Steve Coppell | (Scotland) Graeme Murty | Puma | Kyocera |
| Sunderland | (Republic of Ireland) Roy Keane | (England) Dean Whitehead | Umbro | boylesports.com |
| Tottenham Hotspur | (Spain) Juande Ramos | (England) Ledley King | Puma | Mansion Casino |
| West Ham United | (England) Alan Curbishley | (Australia) Lucas Neill | Umbro | XL Airways |
| Wigan Athletic | (England) Steve Bruce | (Netherlands) Mario Melchiot | Umbro | JJB |

In addition, Premier League officials were supplied with new kit made by Umbro, replacing American makers Official Sports, and were sponsored by AirAsia, replacing Emirates. The 2007–08 season saw a new font used for the names on the back of players' shirts.

=== Managerial changes ===
| Team | Outgoing manager | Manner of departure | Date of vacancy | Position in table | Incoming manager | Date of appointment |
|---|---|---|---|---|---|---|
| Wigan Athletic | (England) Paul Jewell | Resigned | 14 May 2007 | Pre-season | (England) Chris Hutchings | 14 May 2007 |
| Newcastle United | (England) Nigel Pearson | End of caretaker period | 14 May 2007 | Pre-season | (England) Sam Allardyce | 15 May 2007 |
| Manchester City | (England) Stuart Pearce | Sacked | 14 May 2007 | Pre-season | (Sweden) Sven-Göran Eriksson | 6 July 2007 |
| Chelsea | (Portugal) José Mourinho | Mutual consent | 20 September 2007 | 5th | (Israel) Avram Grant | 20 September 2007 |
| Bolton Wanderers | (England) Sammy Lee | Mutual consent | 17 October 2007 | 19th | (England) Gary Megson | 25 October 2007 |
| Tottenham Hotspur | (Netherlands) Martin Jol | Sacked | 25 October 2007 | 18th | (Spain) Juande Ramos | 27 October 2007 |
| Wigan Athletic | (England) Chris Hutchings | Sacked | 5 November 2007 | 18th | (England) Steve Bruce | 26 November 2007 |
| Birmingham City | (England) Steve Bruce | Signed by Wigan | 19 November 2007 | 15th | (Scotland) Alex McLeish | 28 November 2007 |
| Derby County | (Scotland) Billy Davies | Mutual consent | 26 November 2007 | 20th | (England) Paul Jewell | 28 November 2007 |
| Fulham | (Northern Ireland) Lawrie Sanchez | Sacked | 21 December 2007 | 18th | (England) Roy Hodgson | 30 December 2007 |
| Newcastle United | (England) Sam Allardyce | Mutual consent | 9 January 2008 | 11th | (England) Kevin Keegan | 16 January 2008 |

== League table ==
| Pos | Team | Pld | W | D | L | GF | GA | GD | Pts | Qualification or relegation |
|---|---|---|---|---|---|---|---|---|---|---|
| 1 | Manchester United (C) | 38 | 27 | 6 | 5 | 80 | 22 | +58 | 87 | Qualification for the Champions League group stage |
| 2 | Chelsea | 38 | 25 | 10 | 3 | 65 | 26 | +39 | 85 | Qualification for the Champions League group stage |
| 3 | Arsenal | 38 | 24 | 11 | 3 | 74 | 31 | +43 | 83 | Qualification for the Champions League third qualifying round |
| 4 | Liverpool | 38 | 21 | 13 | 4 | 67 | 28 | +39 | 76 | Qualification for the Champions League third qualifying round |
| 5 | Everton | 38 | 19 | 8 | 11 | 55 | 33 | +22 | 65 | Qualification for the UEFA Cup first round |
| 6 | Aston Villa | 38 | 16 | 12 | 10 | 71 | 51 | +20 | 60 | Qualification for the Intertoto Cup third round |
| 7 | Blackburn Rovers | 38 | 15 | 13 | 10 | 50 | 48 | +2 | 58 | |
| 8 | Portsmouth | 38 | 16 | 9 | 13 | 48 | 40 | +8 | 57 | Qualification for the UEFA Cup first round (Note: As FA Cup winners) |
| 9 | Manchester City | 38 | 15 | 10 | 13 | 45 | 53 | −8 | 55 | Qualification for the UEFA Cup first qualifying round (Note: Manchester City qualified as the highest-ranked team not already qualified for European competitions of Premier League Fair Play Ranking by The Football Association, the top association among UEFA Fair Play ranking winners.) |
| 10 | West Ham United | 38 | 13 | 10 | 15 | 42 | 50 | −8 | 49 | |
| 11 | Tottenham Hotspur | 38 | 11 | 13 | 14 | 66 | 61 | +5 | 46 | Qualification for the UEFA Cup first round (Note: As League Cup winners) |
| 12 | Newcastle United | 38 | 11 | 10 | 17 | 45 | 65 | −20 | 43 | |
| 13 | Middlesbrough | 38 | 10 | 12 | 16 | 43 | 53 | −10 | 42 | |
| 14 | Wigan Athletic | 38 | 10 | 10 | 18 | 34 | 51 | −17 | 40 | |
| 15 | Sunderland | 38 | 11 | 6 | 21 | 36 | 59 | −23 | 39 | |
| 16 | Bolton Wanderers | 38 | 9 | 10 | 19 | 36 | 54 | −18 | 37 | |
| 17 | Fulham | 38 | 8 | 12 | 18 | 38 | 60 | −22 | 36 | |
| 18 | Reading (R) | 38 | 10 | 6 | 22 | 41 | 66 | −25 | 36 | Relegation to Football League Championship |
| 19 | Birmingham City (R) | 38 | 8 | 11 | 19 | 46 | 62 | −16 | 35 | Relegation to Football League Championship |
| 20 | Derby County (R) | 38 | 1 | 8 | 29 | 20 | 89 | −69 | 11 | Relegation to Football League Championship |

Source: Barclays Premier League
Rules for classification: 1) points; 2) goal difference; 3) number of goals scored.
For further information on European qualification see Premier League – Competition
(C) Champions; (R) Relegated

== Results ==
| Home \ Away | ARS | AVL | BIR | BLB | BOL | CHE | DER | EVE | FUL | LIV | MCI | MUN | MID | NEW | POR | REA | SUN | TOT | WHU | WIG |
|---|---|---|---|---|---|---|---|---|---|---|---|---|---|---|---|---|---|---|---|---|
| Arsenal | | 1–1 | 1–1 | 2–0 | 2–0 | 1–0 | 5–0 | 1–0 | 2–1 | 1–1 | 1–0 | 2–2 | 1–1 | 3–0 | 3–1 | 2–0 | 3–2 | 2–1 | 2–0 | 2–0 |
| Aston Villa | 1–2 | | 5–1 | 1–1 | 4–0 | 2–0 | 2–0 | 2–0 | 2–1 | 1–2 | 1–1 | 1–4 | 1–1 | 4–1 | 1–3 | 3–1 | 0–1 | 2–1 | 1–0 | 0–2 |
| Birmingham City | 2–2 | 1–2 | | 4–1 | 1–0 | 0–1 | 1–1 | 1–1 | 1–1 | 2–2 | 3–1 | 0–1 | 3–0 | 1–1 | 0–2 | 1–1 | 2–2 | 4–1 | 0–1 | 3–2 |
| Blackburn Rovers | 1–1 | 0–4 | 2–1 | | 4–1 | 0–1 | 3–1 | 0–0 | 1–1 | 0–0 | 1–0 | 1–1 | 1–1 | 3–1 | 0–1 | 4–2 | 1–0 | 1–1 | 0–1 | 3–1 |
| Bolton Wanderers | 2–3 | 1–1 | 3–0 | 1–2 | | 0–1 | 1–0 | 1–2 | 0–0 | 1–3 | 0–0 | 1–0 | 0–0 | 1–3 | 0–1 | 3–0 | 2–0 | 1–1 | 1–0 | 4–1 |
| Chelsea | 2–1 | 4–4 | 3–2 | 0–0 | 1–1 | | 6–1 | 1–1 | 0–0 | 0–0 | 6–0 | 2–1 | 1–0 | 2–1 | 1–0 | 1–0 | 2–0 | 2–0 | 1–0 | 1–1 |
| Derby County | 2–6 | 0–6 | 1–2 | 1–2 | 1–1 | 0–2 | | 0–2 | 2–2 | 1–2 | 1–1 | 0–1 | 0–1 | 1–0 | 2–2 | 0–4 | 0–0 | 0–3 | 0–5 | 0–1 |
| Everton | 1–4 | 2–2 | 3–1 | 1–1 | 2–0 | 0–1 | 1–0 | | 3–0 | 1–2 | 1–0 | 0–1 | 2–0 | 3–1 | 3–1 | 1–0 | 7–1 | 0–0 | 1–1 | 2–1 |
| Fulham | 0–3 | 2–1 | 2–0 | 2–2 | 2–1 | 1–2 | 0–0 | 1–0 | | 0–2 | 3–3 | 0–3 | 1–2 | 0–1 | 0–2 | 3–1 | 1–3 | 3–3 | 0–1 | 1–1 |
| Liverpool | 1–1 | 2–2 | 0–0 | 3–1 | 4–0 | 1–1 | 6–0 | 1–0 | 2–0 | | 1–0 | 0–1 | 3–2 | 3–0 | 4–1 | 2–1 | 3–0 | 2–2 | 4–0 | 1–1 |
| Manchester City | 1–3 | 1–0 | 1–0 | 2–2 | 4–2 | 0–2 | 1–0 | 0–2 | 2–3 | 0–0 | | 1–0 | 3–1 | 3–1 | 3–1 | 2–1 | 1–0 | 2–1 | 1–1 | 0–0 |
| Manchester United | 2–1 | 4–0 | 1–0 | 2–0 | 2–0 | 2–0 | 4–1 | 2–1 | 2–0 | 3–0 | 1–2 | | 4–1 | 6–0 | 2–0 | 0–0 | 1–0 | 1–0 | 4–1 | 4–0 |
| Middlesbrough | 2–1 | 0–3 | 2–0 | 1–2 | 0–1 | 0–2 | 1–0 | 0–2 | 1–0 | 1–1 | 8–1 | 2–2 | | 2–2 | 2–0 | 0–1 | 2–2 | 1–1 | 1–2 | 1–0 |
| Newcastle United | 1–1 | 0–0 | 2–1 | 0–1 | 0–0 | 0–2 | 2–2 | 3–2 | 2–0 | 0–3 | 0–2 | 1–5 | 1–1 | | 1–4 | 3–0 | 2–0 | 3–1 | 3–1 | 1–0 |
| Portsmouth | 0–0 | 2–0 | 4–2 | 0–1 | 3–1 | 1–1 | 3–1 | 0–0 | 0–1 | 0–0 | 0–0 | 1–1 | 0–1 | 0–0 | | 7–4 | 1–0 | 0–1 | 0–0 | 2–0 |
| Reading | 1–3 | 1–2 | 2–1 | 0–0 | 0–2 | 1–2 | 1–0 | 1–0 | 0–2 | 3–1 | 2–0 | 0–2 | 1–1 | 2–1 | 0–2 | | 2–1 | 0–1 | 0–3 | 2–1 |
| Sunderland | 0–1 | 1–1 | 2–0 | 1–2 | 3–1 | 0–1 | 1–0 | 0–1 | 1–1 | 0–2 | 1–2 | 0–4 | 3–2 | 1–1 | 2–0 | 2–1 | | 1–0 | 2–1 | 2–0 |
| Tottenham Hotspur | 1–3 | 4–4 | 2–3 | 1–2 | 1–1 | 4–4 | 4–0 | 1–3 | 5–1 | 0–2 | 2–1 | 1–1 | 1–1 | 1–4 | 2–0 | 6–4 | 2–0 | | 4–0 | 4–0 |
| West Ham United | 0–1 | 2–2 | 1–1 | 2–1 | 1–1 | 0–4 | 2–1 | 0–2 | 2–1 | 1–0 | 0–2 | 2–1 | 3–0 | 2–2 | 0–1 | 1–1 | 3–1 | 1–1 | | 1–1 |
| Wigan Athletic | 0–0 | 1–2 | 2–0 | 5–3 | 1–0 | 0–2 | 2–0 | 1–2 | 1–1 | 0–1 | 1–1 | 0–2 | 1–0 | 1–0 | 0–2 | 0–0 | 3–0 | 1–1 | 1–0 | |

Source: Barclays Premier League
Legend: Blue = home team win; Yellow = draw; Red = away team win.

== Season statistics ==
=== Scoring ===
- First goal of the season: Michael Chopra for Sunderland against Tottenham Hotspur (11 August 2007)
- Last goal of the season: Matthew Taylor for Bolton Wanderers against Chelsea (11 May 2008)
- Fastest goal in a match: 28 seconds – Geovanni for Manchester City against Wigan Athletic (1 December 2007)
- Goal scored at the latest point in a match: 90+6 minutes – Andy Reid for Sunderland against West Ham United (29 March 2008)
- Widest winning margin: 7 goals – Middlesbrough 8–1 Manchester City (11 May 2008)
- Most goals in a match: 11 – Portsmouth 7-4 Reading (29 September 2007)
- First hat-trick of the season: Emmanuel Adebayor for Arsenal against Derby County (22 September 2007)
- First own goal of the season: Martin Laursen for Liverpool against Aston Villa (11 August 2007)
- Most goals by one player in a single match: 4
  - Dimitar Berbatov for Tottenham Hotspur against Reading (29 December 2007)
  - Frank Lampard for Chelsea against Derby County (12 March 2008)
- Most hat-tricks scored by one player: 2
  - Benjani for Portsmouth
    - Portsmouth 7–4 Reading (29 September 2007)
    - Portsmouth 3–1 Derby County (19 January 2008)
  - Fernando Torres for Liverpool
    - Liverpool 3–2 Middlesbrough (23 February 2008)
    - Liverpool 4–0 West Ham United (5 March 2008)
  - Emmanuel Adebayor for Arsenal
    - Arsenal 5–0 Derby County (22 September 2007)
    - Derby County 2–6 Arsenal (28 April 2008)
      - This is the first time in the Premier League that any player has scored a hat-trick against the same team twice in one season.
- Most goals by one team in a match: 8
  - Middlesbrough 8–1 Manchester City (11 May 2008)
- Most goals in one half by one team: 6
  - Manchester United 6–0 Newcastle United (12 January 2008)
  - Middlesbrough 8–1 Manchester City (11 May 2008)
- Most goals scored by losing team: 4 – Reading
  - Portsmouth 7–4 Reading (29 September 2007)
  - Tottenham Hotspur 6–4 Reading (29 December 2007)

==== Top scorers ====
| Rank | Player | Club | Goals |
|---|---|---|---|
| 1 | (Portugal) Cristiano Ronaldo | Manchester United | 31 |
| 2 | (Togo) Emmanuel Adebayor | Arsenal | 24 |
| 2 | (Spain) Fernando Torres | Liverpool | 24 |
| 4 | (Paraguay) Roque Santa Cruz | Blackburn Rovers | 19 |
| 5 | (Zimbabwe) Benjani | Portsmouth / Manchester City | 15 |
| 5 | (Bulgaria) Dimitar Berbatov | Tottenham Hotspur | 15 |
| 5 | (Republic of Ireland) Robbie Keane | Tottenham Hotspur | 15 |
| 5 | (Nigeria) Yakubu | Everton | 15 |
| 9 | (Argentina) Carlos Tevez | Manchester United | 14 |
| 10 | (Norway) John Carew | Aston Villa | 13 |

==== Fastest scorers ====
| Scorer | Time (seconds) | Team | Opponent |
|---|---|---|---|
| (Brazil) Geovanni | 28 | Manchester City | Wigan Athletic |
| (England) Cameron Jerome | 32 | Birmingham City | Derby County |
| (Nigeria) Yakubu | 47 | Everton | Portsmouth |
| (Northern Ireland) David Healy | 50 | Fulham | Arsenal |

=== Clean sheets ===
- Most clean sheets – Manchester United and Chelsea (21)
- Fewest clean sheets – Derby County and Birmingham (3)

=== Discipline ===
- First yellow card of the season: Didier Zokora for Tottenham Hotspur against Sunderland (11 August 2007)
- First red card of the season: Dave Kitson for Reading against Manchester United (12 August 2007)
- Most yellow cards: Middlesbrough (85)
- Fewest yellow cards: Everton (40)
- Most red cards: Chelsea and Fulham (6)
- Fewest red cards: Bolton (0)

=== Average home attendance ===
- Highest average home attendance: 75,691 (Manchester United)
- Lowest average home attendance: 19,046 (Wigan Athletic)

=== Overall ===
- Most wins – Manchester United (27)
- Fewest wins – Derby County (1)
- Most losses – Derby County (29)
- Fewest losses – Arsenal and Chelsea (3)
- Most goals scored – Manchester United (80)
- Fewest goals scored – Derby County (20)
- Most goals conceded – Derby County (89)
- Fewest goals conceded – Manchester United (22)

=== Home ===
- Most wins – Manchester United (17)
- Fewest wins – Derby County (1)
- Most losses – Derby County (13)
- Fewest losses – Arsenal and Chelsea (0)
- Most goals scored – Manchester United (47)
- Fewest goals scored – Derby County (12)
- Most goals conceded – Derby County (43)
- Fewest goals conceded – Manchester United (7)

=== Away ===
- Most wins – Chelsea (13)
- Fewest wins – Derby County (0)
- Most losses – Derby County (16)
- Fewest losses – Arsenal, Chelsea and Liverpool (3)
- Most goals scored – Arsenal and Aston Villa (37)
- Fewest goals scored – Derby County (8)
- Most goals conceded – Derby County (46)
- Fewest goals conceded – Chelsea (13)

=== Records ===
- Derby County finished with the worst record since the league was founded in 1992–93 and also the worst since the introduction of the three points for a win rule. Among the records set by the Rams were:
  - A final record of one win, eight draws and 29 losses for a total of eleven points, worse than the Sunderland team from 2005–06, with the previously set lows of three wins, six draws and 29 losses totalling fifteen points. The single win, coming at home against Newcastle United 1–0 on 17 September was also a record for the fewest wins in a Premier League campaign
  - Derby's 20 goals scored as a team (with Ronaldo, Adebayor and Torres each scoring more goals individually) was lower than the 2002–03 Black Cats' total with 21 goals scored. This marked the third time a team was outscored by one or more players. The team also failed to score in 21 of their 38 games
  - Their −69 goal difference (20 goals scored, 89 conceded) was worse than Ipswich Town's 1994–95 goal difference of −57 (36 goals scored, 93 conceded). The 89 goals they conceded was the worst defensive performance by a team since Ipswich Town conceded 93 goals in 1994–95. It was also the worst record since the Premier League adopted the 20-team, 38-match format in 1995–96
  - The 29 defeats they suffered equalled the 2005–06 Sunderland team for the most losses suffered in one Premier League season
- Chelsea's 85 points accumulated was a new record for the most points gained in a 38-game season without securing the title. The 83 points achieved by Arsenal was a new record for the most points gained in a 38-game season for finishing third
- Manchester United's goal difference of +58 was the greatest ever attained in a Premier League season, beating the record set by Chelsea in 2004–05
- Cristiano Ronaldo beat his own record for most goals scored by a midfielder, raising the record to 31 goals. The previous record was 17 goals, from the previous season. Furthermore, his goal total equalled the highest number of goals ever scored in the Premier League during a 38-game season, equalling the record first set by Blackburn Rovers' Alan Shearer during the 1995–96 season
- Marcus Bent and Roque Santa Cruz each scored a hat trick for their team during Wigan Athletic's 5–3 victory over Blackburn Rovers on 15 December 2007. This is the first time in Premier League history that players from opposing sides both scored hat-tricks in the same match
- Emmanuel Adebayor scored two hat tricks home and away against Derby. This was the first time in the Premier League that a player had scored a hat trick against the same team twice in the league
- Fernando Torres scored 24 goals for Liverpool, a new record for goals scored by a foreign player during his debut season

== Awards ==
=== Monthly awards ===
| Month | Manager of the Month | | Player of the Month | | Reference |
| Month | Manager | Club | Player | Club | Reference |
|---|---|---|---|---|---|
| August | (Sweden) Sven-Göran Eriksson | Manchester City | (England) Micah Richards | Manchester City | |
| September | (France) Arsène Wenger | Arsenal | (Spain) Cesc Fàbregas | Arsenal | |
| October | (Wales) Mark Hughes | Blackburn Rovers | (England) Wayne Rooney | Manchester United | |
| November | (Northern Ireland) Martin O'Neill | Aston Villa | (England) Gabriel Agbonlahor | Aston Villa | |
| December | (France) Arsène Wenger | Arsenal | (Paraguay) Roque Santa Cruz | Blackburn Rovers | |
| January | (Scotland) Sir Alex Ferguson | Manchester United | (Portugal) Cristiano Ronaldo | Manchester United | |
| February | (Scotland) David Moyes | Everton | (Spain) Fernando Torres | Liverpool | |
| March | (Scotland) Sir Alex Ferguson | Manchester United | (Portugal) Cristiano Ronaldo | Manchester United | |
| April | (Israel) Avram Grant | Chelsea | (England) Ashley Young | Aston Villa | |

=== Annual awards ===
PFA Team of the Year 2007–08

| Award | Winner | Club |
|---|---|---|
| Premier League Manager of the Season | (Scotland) Sir Alex Ferguson | Manchester United |
| Premier League Player of the Season | (Portugal) Cristiano Ronaldo | Manchester United |
| PFA Players' Player of the Year | (Portugal) Cristiano Ronaldo | Manchester United |
| PFA Young Player of the Year | (Spain) Cesc Fàbregas | Arsenal |
| FWA Footballer of the Year | (Portugal) Cristiano Ronaldo | Manchester United |
| LMA Manager of the Year | (Scotland) Sir Alex Ferguson | Manchester United |
| PFA Fans' Player of the Year | (Portugal) Cristiano Ronaldo | Manchester United |

PFA Team of the Year
| Goalkeeper | (England) David James (Portsmouth) | | | |
| Defence | (France) Bacary Sagna (Arsenal) | (England) Rio Ferdinand (Manchester United) | (Serbia) Nemanja Vidić (Manchester United) | (France) Gaël Clichy (Arsenal) |
| Midfield | (Portugal) Cristiano Ronaldo (Manchester United) | (England) Steven Gerrard (Liverpool) | (Spain) Cesc Fàbregas (Arsenal) | (England) Ashley Young (Aston Villa) |
| Attack | (Togo) Emmanuel Adebayor (Arsenal) | | (Spain) Fernando Torres (Liverpool) | |

== Attendances ==
| No. | Club | Matches | Total attendance | Average |
|---|---|---|---|---|
| 1 | Manchester United | 19 | 1,438,136 | 75,691 |
| 2 | Arsenal | 19 | 1,141,335 | 60,070 |
| 3 | Newcastle United | 19 | 975,093 | 51,321 |
| 4 | Liverpool | 19 | 827,111 | 43,532 |
| 5 | Sunderland | 19 | 823,540 | 43,344 |
| 6 | Manchester City | 19 | 800,400 | 42,126 |
| 7 | Chelsea | 19 | 786,549 | 41,397 |
| 8 | Aston Villa | 19 | 760,560 | 40,029 |
| 9 | Everton | 19 | 702,142 | 36,955 |
| 10 | Tottenham Hotspur | 19 | 683,370 | 35,967 |
| 11 | West Ham United | 19 | 657,423 | 34,601 |
| 12 | Derby County | 19 | 616,216 | 32,432 |
| 13 | Middlesbrough | 19 | 507,450 | 26,708 |
| 14 | Birmingham City | 19 | 497,438 | 26,181 |
| 15 | Blackburn Rovers | 19 | 454,928 | 23,944 |
| 16 | Fulham | 19 | 451,714 | 23,774 |
| 17 | Reading | 19 | 448,115 | 23,585 |
| 18 | Bolton Wanderers | 19 | 397,122 | 20,901 |
| 19 | Portsmouth | 19 | 378,367 | 19,914 |
| 20 | Wigan Athletic | 19 | 361,876 | 19,046 |
