= 2019–20 Premier League =

Football season in England

Premier League
- Season: 2019–20
- Dates: 9 August 2019 – 26 July 2020
- Champions: Liverpool; 1st Premier League title 19th English title
- Relegated: Bournemouth; Watford; Norwich City
- Champions League: Liverpool; Manchester City; Manchester United; Chelsea
- Europa League: Arsenal; Leicester City; Tottenham Hotspur
- Matches: 380
- Goals: 1,034 (2.72 per match)
- Top goalscorer: Jamie Vardy (23 goals)
- Best goalkeeper: Ederson (16 clean sheets)
- Biggest home win: Manchester City 8–0 Watford (21 September 2019)
- Biggest away win: Southampton 0–9 Leicester City (25 October 2019)
- Highest scoring: Southampton 0–9 Leicester City (25 October 2019)
- Longest winning run: 18 matches Liverpool
- Longest unbeaten run: 27 matches Liverpool
- Longest winless run: 11 matches Watford
- Longest losing run: 10 matches Norwich City
- Highest attendance: 73,737; Manchester United 1–1 Liverpool (20 October 2019)
- Lowest attendance: 10,020; Bournemouth 0–1 Burnley (21 December 2019) (Note: Not including matches after the suspension of the season as, upon resumption, all games had a 300-person attendance limit for public health reasons.)
- Total attendance: 11,322,096
- Average attendance: 39,312

The 2019–20 Premier League was the 28th season of the Premier League, the top English professional football league, since its establishment in 1992, and the 121st season of top-flight English football overall. The season started on 9 August 2019 and concluded on 26 July 2020. Manchester City were the defending champions for the second successive year, after picking up the domestic treble the previous season.

The season was halted for over three months, following a decision on 13 March 2020 by the Premier League to suspend the league after a number of players and other club staff became ill due to the COVID-19 pandemic. The initial suspension, until 4 April, was then extended to mid-June. The season recommenced with two matches on 17 June and a full round of matches played over the weekend of 19–22 June.

Liverpool were crowned champions for the first time since 1990. Their title win was also the club's first of the Premier League era and nineteenth overall. Over the season, the club set a number of English top-flight records including the earliest title win (with seven games to spare), the latest title win (securing the title on 25 June), the biggest points lead at any time (25), and the most consecutive home wins (24, of which 7 were carried over from the previous season).

The season introduced the controversial video assistant referee (VAR) review system. Changes to the laws affecting backpasses, penalties, handballs and substitutions were also introduced in 2019–20.

== Summary ==
The Premier League season marked the start of a new three-year TV deal. One key change was that eight matches were shown on television at 19:45 on Saturdays across the season, broadcast by Sky Sports. Further, Amazon broadcast two rounds of fixtures in December, including the Merseyside derby, marking the first time an entire round of live matches had been broadcast domestically.

It was the first Premier League season to have a mid-season break in February. Three games of a normal round of ten were played on the weekend 8–9 February 2020, six games on the following weekend 14–17 February and the tenth game, Manchester City versus West Ham United, was rescheduled from 9 February to 19 February due to Storm Ciara. Games played on the same day had separate time slots such that the games did not overlap.

=== Title race ===
With Manchester City and Liverpool achieving 98 and 97 points respectively in the 2018–19 season, many expected another close race for the title. Liverpool led the 2019-20 Premier League for almost all of the season, eventually finishing as champions and marking their first league title in 30 years and their first of the Premier League era after Manchester City lost 2-1 to Chelsea at Stamford Bridge on 25 June 2020.

Upon winning the league, Liverpool claimed the unusual achievement of winning the Premier League earlier than any other team by games played (with seven games remaining) and later than any other team by date (the only team to clinch the title in the month of June).

=== Records and achievements ===
On 25 October 2019, Leicester City broke the Premier League record – as well as the all-time English top-flight record – for the largest away league win and equalled the biggest ever Premier League win when they defeated Southampton 9–0 at St Mary's Stadium.

During the season, Liverpool broke or tied several Premier League all-time records. They achieved a record-equalling 18 consecutive wins before being defeated by Watford on 29 February. They also set records of 24 consecutive home wins, and a 25-point lead in the table at any time.

On 12 January 2020, in a 6–1 victory over Aston Villa, Manchester City's Sergio Agüero broke Thierry Henry's Premier League record for most goals scored by an overseas player. In the same match, he also broke the record for most hat-tricks scored by a single player (12), previously held by Alan Shearer.

=== Black Lives Matter impact ===
As a gesture of solidarity following the murder of George Floyd, players' names on the back of their shirts were replaced with 'Black Lives Matter' for the first 12 matches of the restarted season as well as replacing the Premier League badge for the BLM's for the rest of the season. The Premier League also gave their support for any player who chooses to "take a knee" before or during matches. In addition, the NHS tribute badge was also used at all kits for the remainder of the season.

=== Relegation battle ===
On 11 July 2020, Norwich City became the first team to be relegated to the Championship after a 4–0 defeat at home to West Ham United with three games remaining. On 26 July 2020, the final day of the season, Bournemouth were the second team to be relegated to the Championship, despite winning 3–1 away to Everton. Watford were the final team to be relegated to the Championship on the same day, after losing 3–2 away to Arsenal. Both of these results were coupled with Aston Villa's 1–1 draw against West Ham United, ensuring Aston Villa safety in the Premier League for another season. Coincidentally, the three relegated teams were the same teams promoted to the Premier League for the 2015–16 season.

== Effects of the COVID-19 pandemic ==
From March 2020, the season was affected by the COVID-19 pandemic. On 10 March, the match between Manchester City and Arsenal, due to be played the next day after being rescheduled due to City's participation in the 2020 EFL Cup final, was postponed. A number of Arsenal players had made close contact with Olympiacos owner Evangelos Marinakis, who had tested positive for infection with the coronavirus, when the two teams had met in the Europa League 13 days earlier. It was the first football season in England to be halted since the 1939–40 season was abandoned after only three games following the outbreak of the Second World War.

On 12 March, it was revealed that three Leicester City players were self-isolating. Manchester City announced that their defender Benjamin Mendy was also self-isolating, after a family member displayed symptoms of the virus. Later in the evening, it was then confirmed that Arsenal head coach Mikel Arteta had tested positive for coronavirus. As a result of Arteta's positive test, the match between Brighton & Hove Albion and Arsenal, scheduled for 14 March at the Amex, was postponed. On 13 March, Chelsea announced that their winger Callum Hudson-Odoi had tested positive for coronavirus.

On 13 March, following an emergency meeting between the Premier League, The Football Association (FA), the English Football League and the FA Women's Super League, it was unanimously decided to suspend professional football in England until at least 4 April 2020. On 19 March, the suspension was extended to at least 30 April 2020. At the same time the FA agreed to extend the season indefinitely, past the scheduled end date of 1 June. In April 2020, the Secretary of State for Health and Social Care, Matt Hancock, called on Premier League players to take a pay cut during the pandemic. The PFA rejected the call as they felt that a cut for all players would impact the Exchequer with a loss of income tax revenue. Several clubs, including Watford, Southampton and West Ham United, all agreed to defer their wages. Even there was considered the option of cancelling the championship. Later in April, the Premier League produced a plan, nicknamed "Project Restart", aimed at restarting the league and playing all 92 remaining matches over a six-week period at approved, neutral stadiums. Watford, Aston Villa and Brighton, all near the bottom of the table, were of the opinion that it would be unfair to play the games in such different conditions when at risk of relegation but would be more in favour if the threat of relegation was removed. From 19 May 2020, players were allowed to return to group training in preparation for restarting the league. They were permitted to be in groups of no more than five with all training sessions lasting no longer than 75 minutes for each player. Social distancing rules were required to be adhered to during the sessions. On 17 and 18 May, a total of 748 players and staff were tested for COVID-19. Six tests proved positive including Adrian Mariappa of Watford and Burnley assistant manager, Ian Woan. Later in May, Aaron Ramsdale of Bournemouth also returned a positive test for the virus.

A number of players, including Manchester City's Raheem Sterling and Sergio Agüero and Aaron Cresswell of West Ham United, voiced concerns relating to the safety of restarting the campaign. Danny Rose of Newcastle United called the decision to restart "a joke". Troy Deeney of Watford said he would not return to training because of fear for his family's health. N'Golo Kanté of Chelsea also missed training with safety concerns. On 27 May, the clubs voted unanimously to resume contact training. Aston Villa's Tyrone Mings said the players had not been consulted regarding restarting the league and that the restart was "financially driven".

On 28 May, clubs agreed that the season would restart on 17 June, with the two games in hand of Manchester City vs Arsenal and Aston Villa vs Sheffield United, with the first full round of fixtures since March to be played on the weekend of 19–21 June, with all matches played behind closed doors. A plan was announced for all remaining matches to be televised, and to widen the availability of domestic broadcasts: for the first time, the BBC gained rights to broadcast four live matches on free-to-air television, while Sky announced plans to carry 25 matches on its free-to-air channel Pick. Amazon were allotted four matches and announced it would provide a means of streaming them for free without an Amazon Prime subscription; on 18 June it was announced that these matches would be carried on its video game live streaming service Twitch. All broadcasters showed the matches with artificial crowd noise, whilst also providing an alternative option for viewers to watch the matches without the added effects.

On 4 June, the Premier League announced that teams would be allowed to name nine substitutes per match, instead of the usual seven, and that teams could use five substitutes per match instead of three.

Aston Villa vs. Sheffield United and Manchester City vs. Arsenal on 17 June were the first games played after the pandemic enforced break.

Financial services company Deloitte estimated that Premier League clubs would face a £1 billion loss of revenue for the 2019–20 season, £500 million being accounted for in rebates to broadcasters and loss of matchday revenue.

Further tests for the virus were carried out on 11 and 12 June. Two unnamed people provided a positive result including one player from Norwich City who would be required to self-isolate thereby missing the first fixture of the restarted season. Following these tests there had been 16 positive results from 8,687 tests.

Before the restart of games the Premier League produced a set of guidelines to be followed at all games. They stipulated that all matches must be played behind closed doors, with the number of key people allowed inside the stadium limited to 300. All stadiums are divided into three zones — red (includes pitch and technical areas), amber (stands) and green (stand concourses) — and there are restrictions on who is allowed to enter each. There is staggered entry on to the pitch for players and staff and no handshakes are allowed before kick-off. Deep cleaning of corner flags, goalposts, substitution boards and match balls takes place before and after each fixture as standard. Extra disinfection, such as of the substitution board after it is used, is likely during matches and at half-time. Additional measures include that players and coaching staff must observe social distancing rules when travelling to and from games, and post-match broadcast interviews must take place pitchside with press conferences conducted virtually.

Schedule changes
Matchday	Original dates	Revised dates
30	14–16 March	19–22 June
31	20–22 March	23–25 June
32	4–6 April	27 June – 2 July
33	10–13 April	4–6 July
34	18–20 April	7–9 July
35	25–27 April	11–13 July
36	2–4 May	14–17 July
37	9–11 May	18–22 July
38	17 May	26 July

== Teams ==
Twenty teams competed in the league – the top seventeen teams from the previous season and the three teams promoted from the Championship. The promoted teams were Norwich City, Sheffield United and Aston Villa. Norwich City and Aston Villa returned to the top flight after absences of three years, while Sheffield United returned after a twelve-year absence. They replaced Cardiff City, Fulham (both teams relegated to the Championship after one season back in the top flight) and Huddersfield Town (relegated after two years in the top flight). Cardiff City's relegation means that this season was the first without a side from Wales since the 2010–11 season.

=== Stadiums and locations ===
Locations of the 2019–20 Premier League teams
Greater London Premier League football clubs

Note: Table lists in alphabetical order.

Team	Location	Stadium	Capacity
Arsenal	London (Holloway)	Emirates Stadium	60,704
Aston Villa	Birmingham	Villa Park	42,785
Bournemouth	Bournemouth	Dean Court	11,329
Brighton & Hove Albion	Falmer	Falmer Stadium	30,750
Burnley	Burnley	Turf Moor	21,944
Chelsea	London (Fulham)	Stamford Bridge	40,834
Crystal Palace	London (Selhurst)	Selhurst Park	25,486
Everton	Liverpool (Walton)	Goodison Park	39,414
Leicester City	Leicester	King Power Stadium	32,243
Liverpool	Liverpool (Anfield)	Anfield	53,394
Manchester City	Manchester (Bradford)	City of Manchester Stadium	55,097
Manchester United	Trafford (Old Trafford)	Old Trafford	74,879
Newcastle United	Newcastle upon Tyne	St James' Park	52,388
Norwich City	Norwich	Carrow Road	27,244
Sheffield United	Sheffield	Bramall Lane	32,125
Southampton	Southampton	St Mary's Stadium	32,505
Tottenham Hotspur	London (Tottenham)	Tottenham Hotspur Stadium	62,303
Watford	Watford	Vicarage Road	22,220
West Ham United	London (Stratford)	London Stadium	60,000
Wolverhampton Wanderers	Wolverhampton	Molineux Stadium	32,050

=== Personnel and kits ===
Team	Manager	Captain	Kit manufacturer	Shirt sponsor (chest)	Shirt sponsor (sleeve)
Arsenal	(Spain) Mikel Arteta	(Gabon) Pierre-Emerick Aubameyang	Adidas	Emirates	Visit Rwanda
Aston Villa	(England) Dean Smith	(England) Jack Grealish	Kappa	W88	BR88
Bournemouth	(England) Eddie Howe	(England) Simon Francis	Umbro	Vitality (Note: Bournemouth's main shirt sponsor was M88 until 13 June 2020, when Vitality became the main sponsor for the rest of the season.)	Mansion Group
Brighton & Hove Albion	(England) Graham Potter	(England) Lewis Dunk	Nike	American Express	JD
Burnley	(England) Sean Dyche	(England) Ben Mee	Umbro	LoveBet	
Chelsea	(England) Frank Lampard	(Spain) César Azpilicueta	Nike	Three (Note: Chelsea's main shirt sponsor was Yokohama Tyres until 1 July 2020, when Three became the main sponsor ahead of the 2020–21 season.)	Hyundai
Crystal Palace	(England) Roy Hodgson	(Serbia) Luka Milivojević	Puma	ManBetX	Dongqiudi
Everton	(Italy) Carlo Ancelotti	(Republic of Ireland) Séamus Coleman	Umbro	SportPesa	Angry Birds
Leicester City	(Northern Ireland) Brendan Rodgers	(Jamaica) Wes Morgan	Adidas	King Power	Bia Saigon
Liverpool	(Germany) Jürgen Klopp	(England) Jordan Henderson	New Balance	Standard Chartered	Western Union
Manchester City	(Spain) Pep Guardiola	(Spain) David Silva	Puma	Etihad Airways	Nexen Tire
Manchester United	(Norway) Ole Gunnar Solskjær	(England) Harry Maguire	Adidas	Chevrolet	Kohler
Newcastle United	(England) Steve Bruce	(England) Jamaal Lascelles	Puma	Fun88	StormGain
Norwich City	(Germany) Daniel Farke	(Scotland) Grant Hanley	Erreà	Dafabet	Best Fiends
Sheffield United	(England) Chris Wilder	(England) Billy Sharp	Adidas	Union Standard Group	
Southampton	(Austria) Ralph Hasenhüttl	(England) James Ward-Prowse	Under Armour	LD Sports	Virgin Media
Tottenham Hotspur	(Portugal) José Mourinho	(France) Hugo Lloris	Nike	AIA	None
Watford	(England) Hayden Mullins (interim)	(England) Troy Deeney	Adidas	Sportsbet.io	Bitcoin
West Ham United	(Scotland) David Moyes	(England) Mark Noble	Umbro	Betway	Scope Markets
Wolverhampton Wanderers	(Portugal) Nuno Espírito Santo	(England) Conor Coady	Adidas	ManBetX	CoinDeal

=== Managerial changes ===
Team	Outgoing manager	Manner of departure	Date of vacancy	Position in table	Incoming manager	Date of appointment
Brighton & Hove Albion	(Republic of Ireland) Chris Hughton	Sacked	13 May 2019	Pre-season	(England) Graham Potter	20 May 2019
Chelsea	(Italy) Maurizio Sarri	Signed by Juventus	16 June 2019	Pre-season	(England) Frank Lampard	4 July 2019
Newcastle United	(Spain) Rafael Benítez	End of contract	30 June 2019	Pre-season	(England) Steve Bruce	17 July 2019
Watford	(Spain) Javi Gracia	Sacked	7 September 2019	20th	(Spain) Quique Sánchez Flores	7 September 2019
Tottenham Hotspur	(Argentina) Mauricio Pochettino	Sacked	19 November 2019	14th	(Portugal) José Mourinho	20 November 2019
Arsenal	(Spain) Unai Emery	Sacked	29 November 2019	8th	(Spain) Mikel Arteta	20 December 2019
Watford	(Spain) Quique Sánchez Flores	Sacked	1 December 2019	20th	(England) Nigel Pearson	6 December 2019
Everton	(Portugal) Marco Silva	Sacked	5 December 2019	18th	(Italy) Carlo Ancelotti	21 December 2019
West Ham United	(Chile) Manuel Pellegrini	Sacked	28 December 2019	17th	(Scotland) David Moyes	29 December 2019
Watford	(England) Nigel Pearson	Sacked	19 July 2020	17th	(England) Hayden Mullins (interim)	19 July 2020

== League table ==
Pos	Team	Pld	W	D	L	GF	GA	GD	Pts	Qualification or relegation
1	Liverpool (C)	38	32	3	3	85	33	+52	99	Qualification for the Champions League group stage
2	Manchester City	38	26	3	9	102	35	+67	81	Qualification for the Champions League group stage
3	Manchester United	38	18	12	8	66	36	+30	66	Qualification for the Champions League group stage
4	Chelsea	38	20	6	12	69	54	+15	66	Qualification for the Champions League group stage
5	Leicester City	38	18	8	12	67	41	+26	62	Qualification for the Europa League group stage
6	Tottenham Hotspur	38	16	11	11	61	47	+14	59	Qualification for the Europa League second qualifying round (Note: Since the winners of the 2019–20 EFL Cup, Manchester City, qualified for the Champions League group stage by league position, the spot given to the EFL Cup winners (Europa League second qualifying round) was passed down to the sixth-placed team.)
7	Wolverhampton Wanderers	38	15	14	9	51	40	+11	59	
8	Arsenal	38	14	14	10	56	48	+8	56	Qualification for the Europa League group stage (Note: Arsenal qualified for the Europa League group stage as the 2019–20 FA Cup winners.)
9	Sheffield United	38	14	12	12	39	39	0	54	
10	Burnley	38	15	9	14	43	50	−7	54	
11	Southampton	38	15	7	16	51	60	−9	52	
12	Everton	38	13	10	15	44	56	−12	49	
13	Newcastle United	38	11	11	16	38	58	−20	44	
14	Crystal Palace	38	11	10	17	31	50	−19	43	
15	Brighton & Hove Albion	38	9	14	15	39	54	−15	41	
16	West Ham United	38	10	9	19	49	62	−13	39	
17	Aston Villa	38	9	8	21	41	67	−26	35	
18	Bournemouth (R)	38	9	7	22	40	65	−25	34	Relegation to EFL Championship
19	Watford (R)	38	8	10	20	36	64	−28	34	Relegation to EFL Championship
20	Norwich City (R)	38	5	6	27	26	75	−49	21	Relegation to EFL Championship

Source: Premier League
Rules for classification: 1) Points; 2) Goal difference; 3) Goals scored; 4) If the champions, relegated teams or qualified teams for UEFA competitions cannot be determined by rules 1 to 3, rules 4.1 to 4.3 are applied – 4.1) Points gained in head to head record between such teams; 4.2) Away goals scored in head to head record between such teams; 4.3) Play-offs
(C) Champions; (R) Relegated

== Results ==
Home \ Away	ARS	AVL	BOU	BHA	BUR	CHE	CRY	EVE	LEI	LIV	MCI	MUN	NEW	NOR	SHU	SOU	TOT	WAT	WHU	WOL
Arsenal	—	3–2	1–0	1–2	2–1	1–2	2–2	3–2	1–1	2–1	0–3	2–0	4–0	4–0	1–1	2–2	2–2	3–2	1–0	1–1
Aston Villa	1–0	—	1–2	2–1	2–2	1–2	2–0	2–0	1–4	1–2	1–6	0–3	2–0	1–0	0–0	1–3	2–3	2–1	0–0	0–1
Bournemouth	1–1	2–1	—	3–1	0–1	2–2	0–2	3–1	4–1	0–3	1–3	1–0	1–4	0–0	1–1	0–2	0–0	0–3	2–2	1–2
Brighton & Hove Albion	2–1	1–1	2–0	—	1–1	1–1	0–1	3–2	0–2	1–3	0–5	0–3	0–0	2–0	0–1	0–2	3–0	1–1	1–1	2–2
Burnley	0–0	1–2	3–0	1–2	—	2–4	0–2	1–0	2–1	0–3	1–4	0–2	1–0	2–0	1–1	3–0	1–1	1–0	3–0	1–1
Chelsea	2–2	2–1	0–1	2–0	3–0	—	2–0	4–0	1–1	1–2	2–1	0–2	1–0	1–0	2–2	0–2	2–1	3–0	0–1	2–0
Crystal Palace	1–1	1–0	1–0	1–1	0–1	2–3	—	0–0	0–2	1–2	0–2	0–2	1–0	2–0	0–1	0–2	1–1	1–0	2–1	1–1
Everton	0–0	1–1	1–3	1–0	1–0	3–1	3–1	—	2–1	0–0	1–3	1–1	2–2	0–2	0–2	1–1	1–1	1–0	2–0	3–2
Leicester City	2–0	4–0	3–1	0–0	2–1	2–2	3–0	2–1	—	0–4	0–1	0–2	5–0	1–1	2–0	1–2	2–1	2–0	4–1	0–0
Liverpool	3–1	2–0	2–1	2–1	1–1	5–3	4–0	5–2	2–1	—	3–1	2–0	3–1	4–1	2–0	4–0	2–1	2–0	3–2	1–0
Manchester City	3–0	3–0	2–1	4–0	5–0	2–1	2–2	2–1	3–1	4–0	—	1–2	5–0	5–0	2–0	2–1	2–2	8–0	2–0	0–2
Manchester United	1–1	2–2	5–2	3–1	0–2	4–0	1–2	1–1	1–0	1–1	2–0	—	4–1	4–0	3–0	2–2	2–1	3–0	1–1	0–0
Newcastle United	0–1	1–1	2–1	0–0	0–0	1–0	1–0	1–2	0–3	1–3	2–2	1–0	—	0–0	3–0	2–1	1–3	1–1	2–2	1–1
Norwich City	2–2	1–5	1–0	0–1	0–2	2–3	1–1	0–1	1–0	0–1	3–2	1–3	3–1	—	1–2	0–3	2–2	0–2	0–4	1–2
Sheffield United	1–0	2–0	2–1	1–1	3–0	3–0	1–0	0–1	1–2	0–1	0–1	3–3	0–2	1–0	—	0–1	3–1	1–1	1–0	1–0
Southampton	0–2	2–0	1–3	1–1	1–2	1–4	1–1	1–2	0–9	1–2	1–0	1–1	0–1	2–1	3–1	—	1–0	2–1	0–1	2–3
Tottenham Hotspur	2–1	3–1	3–2	2–1	5–0	0–2	4–0	1–0	3–0	0–1	2–0	1–1	0–1	2–1	1–1	2–1	—	1–1	2–0	2–3
Watford	2–2	3–0	0–0	0–3	0–3	1–2	0–0	2–3	1–1	3–0	0–4	2–0	2–1	2–1	0–0	1–3	0–0	—	1–3	2–1
West Ham United	1–3	1–1	4–0	3–3	0–1	3–2	1–2	1–1	1–2	0–2	0–5	2–0	2–3	2–0	1–1	3–1	2–3	3–1	—	0–2
Wolverhampton Wanderers	0–2	2–1	1–0	0–0	1–1	2–5	2–0	3–0	0–0	1–2	3–2	1–1	1–1	3–0	1–1	1–1	1–2	2–0	2–0	—

Source: Premier League
Legend: Blue = home team win; Yellow = draw; Red = away team win.
For upcoming matches, an "a" indicates there is an article about the rivalry between the two participants.

== Season statistics ==
=== Scoring ===
==== Top scorers ====
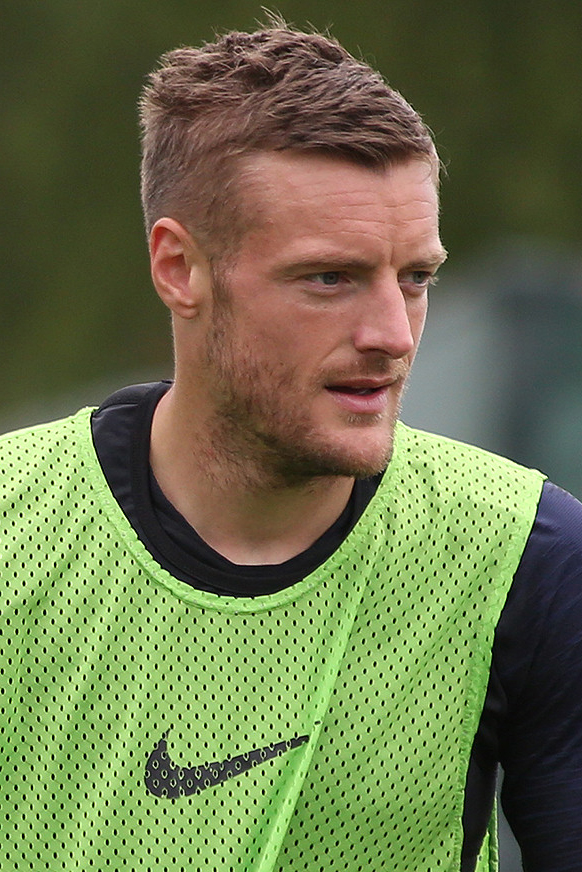
Jamie Vardy won the Premier League Golden Boot after scoring 23 goals, becoming the oldest player to win the award.

Rank	Player	Club	Goals
1	(England) Jamie Vardy	Leicester City	23
2	(Gabon) Pierre-Emerick Aubameyang	Arsenal	22
2	(England) Danny Ings	Southampton	22
4	(England) Raheem Sterling	Manchester City	20
5	(Egypt) Mohamed Salah	Liverpool	19
6	(England) Harry Kane	Tottenham Hotspur	18
6	(Senegal) Sadio Mané	Liverpool	18
8	(Mexico) Raúl Jiménez	Wolverhampton Wanderers	17
8	(France) Anthony Martial	Manchester United	17
8	(England) Marcus Rashford	Manchester United	17

==== Hat-tricks ====
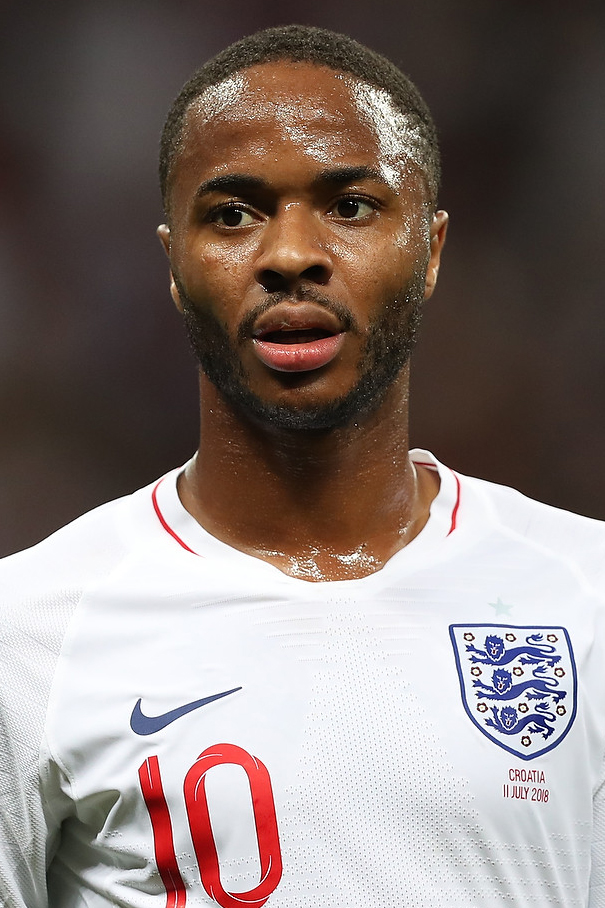
Raheem Sterling scored two hat-tricks this season, and was the only player to score multiple hat-tricks.

Player	For	Against	Result	Date
(England) Raheem Sterling	Manchester City	West Ham United	5–0 (A)	10 August 2019
(Finland) Teemu Pukki	Norwich City	Newcastle United	3–1 (H)	17 August 2019
(England) Tammy Abraham	Chelsea	Wolverhampton Wanderers	5–2 (A)	14 September 2019
(Portugal) Bernardo Silva	Manchester City	Watford	8–0 (H)	21 September 2019
(Spain) Ayoze Pérez	Leicester City	Southampton	9–0 (A)	25 October 2019
(England) Jamie Vardy	Leicester City	Southampton	9–0 (A)	25 October 2019
(United States) Christian Pulisic	Chelsea	Burnley	4–2 (A)	26 October 2019
(Argentina) Sergio Agüero	Manchester City	Aston Villa	6–1 (A)	12 January 2020
(France) Anthony Martial	Manchester United	Sheffield United	3–0 (H)	24 June 2020
(England) Michail Antonio^{4}	West Ham United	Norwich City	4–0 (A)	11 July 2020
(England) Raheem Sterling	Manchester City	Brighton & Hove Albion	5–0 (A)	11 July 2020

Notes

^{4} Player scored 4 goals
(H) – Home team
(A) – Away team

=== Clean sheets ===
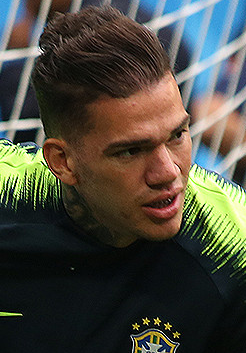
Ederson won the Premier League Golden Glove after keeping 16 clean sheets for Manchester City.

Rank	Player	Club	Clean sheets
1	(Brazil) Ederson	Manchester City	16
2	(England) Nick Pope	Burnley	15
3	(Brazil) Alisson	Liverpool	13
3	(Spain) David de Gea	Manchester United	13
3	(England) Dean Henderson	Sheffield United	13
3	(Portugal) Rui Patrício	Wolverhampton Wanderers	13
3	(Denmark) Kasper Schmeichel	Leicester City	13
8	(Slovakia) Martin Dúbravka	Newcastle United	11
9	(Spain) Vicente Guaita	Crystal Palace	10
10	(England) Ben Foster	Watford	9
10	(England) Jordan Pickford	Everton	9
10	(Australia) Mathew Ryan	Brighton & Hove Albion	9

=== Discipline ===
==== Player ====
- Most yellow cards: 12
  - (Serbia) Luka Milivojević (Crystal Palace)
- Most red cards: 2
  - (Brazil) Fernandinho (Manchester City)
  - (Belgium) Christian Kabasele (Watford)
  - (Brazil) David Luiz (Arsenal)

==== Club ====
- Most yellow cards: 86
  - Arsenal
- Most red cards: 5
  - Arsenal

== Awards ==
=== Monthly awards ===
Month	Manager of the Month		Player of the Month		Goal of the Month		References
Month	Manager	Club	Player	Club	Player	Club	References
August	(Germany) Jürgen Klopp	Liverpool	(Finland) Teemu Pukki	Norwich City	(England) Harvey Barnes	Leicester City	
September	(Germany) Jürgen Klopp	Liverpool	(Gabon) Pierre-Emerick Aubameyang	Arsenal	(Mali) Moussa Djenepo	Southampton	
October	(England) Frank Lampard	Chelsea	(England) Jamie Vardy	Leicester City	(England) Matty Longstaff	Newcastle United	
November	(Germany) Jürgen Klopp	Liverpool	(Senegal) Sadio Mané	Liverpool	(Belgium) Kevin De Bruyne	Manchester City	
December	(Germany) Jürgen Klopp	Liverpool	(England) Trent Alexander-Arnold	Liverpool	(South Korea) Son Heung-min	Tottenham Hotspur	
January	(Germany) Jürgen Klopp	Liverpool	(Argentina) Sergio Agüero	Manchester City	(Iran) Alireza Jahanbakhsh	Brighton & Hove Albion	
February	(England) Sean Dyche	Burnley	(Portugal) Bruno Fernandes	Manchester United	(Czech Republic) Matěj Vydra	Burnley	
June	(Portugal) Nuno Espírito Santo	Wolverhampton Wanderers	(Portugal) Bruno Fernandes	Manchester United	(Portugal) Bruno Fernandes	Manchester United	
July	(Austria) Ralph Hasenhüttl	Southampton	(England) Michail Antonio	West Ham United	(Belgium) Kevin De Bruyne	Manchester City	

=== Annual awards ===
Award	Winner	Club
Premier League Manager of the Season	(Germany) Jürgen Klopp	Liverpool
Premier League Player of the Season	(Belgium) Kevin De Bruyne	Manchester City
Premier League Young Player of the Season	(England) Trent Alexander-Arnold	Liverpool
Premier League Goal of the Season	(South Korea) Son Heung-min	Tottenham Hotspur
PFA Players' Player of the Year	(Belgium) Kevin De Bruyne	Manchester City
PFA Young Player of the Year	(England) Trent Alexander-Arnold	Liverpool
FWA Footballer of the Year	(England) Jordan Henderson	Liverpool
PFA Fans' Player of the Year	(Senegal) Sadio Mané	Liverpool

PFA Team of the Year
Goalkeeper	(England) Nick Pope (Burnley)			
Defenders	(England) Trent Alexander-Arnold (Liverpool)	(Netherlands) Virgil van Dijk (Liverpool)	(Turkey) Çağlar Söyüncü (Leicester City)	(Scotland) Andy Robertson (Liverpool)
Midfielders	(Spain) David Silva (Manchester City)		(England) Jordan Henderson (Liverpool)	(Belgium) Kevin De Bruyne (Manchester City)
Forwards	(England) Jamie Vardy (Leicester City)		(Gabon) Pierre-Emerick Aubameyang (Arsenal)	(Senegal) Sadio Mané (Liverpool)
