= Portsmouth F.C. 7–4 Reading F.C. =

Portsmouth 7–4 Reading
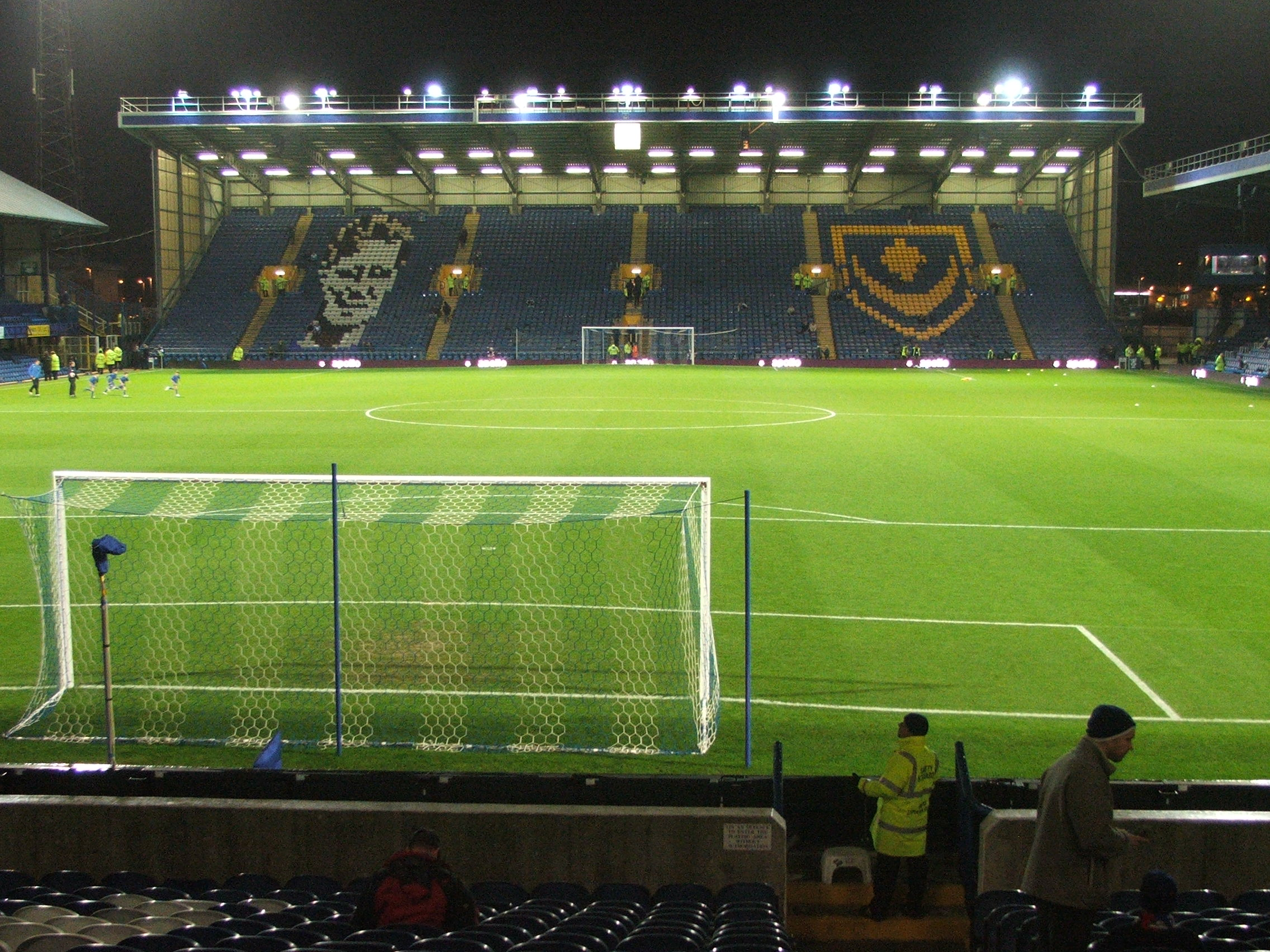
- Event: 2007–08 Premier League
Portsmouth	Reading
7	4
- Date: 29 September 2007
- Venue: Fratton Park, Portsmouth
- Referee: Mark Halsey (Lancashire)
- Attendance: 20,102

The 2007–08 Premier League match between Portsmouth and Reading on 29 September 2007, set a record as the highest scoring match in Premier League history. The match was played at Fratton Park in Portsmouth on 29 September 2007. Eleven goals were scored in the match, leaving a final scoreline of 7–4 in Portsmouth's favour. This included six goals during the last twenty minutes of the match, including two scored in injury time.

== Match ==
=== Summary ===
With nine different scorers, including an own goal for each side, the match also shares the record for the most goal scorers in a Premier League match, held with Arsenal's 5–4 win at Tottenham Hotspur in 2004–05. Nicky Shorey missed a penalty in the 66th minute.

=== Details ===
29 September 2007
15:00 BST

Portsmouth	7–4	Reading
Benjani 6', 37', 70'; Hreiðarsson 55'; Kranjčar 75'; Ingimarsson 81' (o.g.); Muntari 90+2' (pen.)	Report	Hunt 45'; Kitson 48'; Long 79'; Campbell 90+4' (o.g.)

Fratton Park, Portsmouth
Attendance: 20,102
Referee: Mark Halsey (Lancashire)

Portsmouth	Reading

GK	1	(England) David James
RB	5	(England) Glen Johnson
CB	23	(England) Sol Campbell (c)
CB	15	(France) Sylvain Distin
LB	7	(Iceland) Hermann Hreiðarsson
DM	28	(England) Sean Davis
CM	8	(Senegal) Papa Bouba Diop
CM	11	(Ghana) Sulley Muntari
RF	19	(Croatia) Niko Kranjčar
CF	25	(Zimbabwe) Benjani		(substituted off) 80'
LF	17	(Nigeria) John Utaka
Substitutes:
GK	13	(England) Jamie Ashdown
DF	16	(France) Noé Pamarot
MF	14	(England) Matthew Taylor	(yellow card) 70'
MF	30	(Portugal) Pedro Mendes
FW	10	(England) David Nugent		(substituted on) 80'
Manager:
(England) Harry Redknapp

GK	1	(United States) Marcus Hahnemann
RB	2	(Scotland) Graeme Murty (c)		(substituted off) 77'
CB	29	(England) Michael Duberry	(yellow card) 90+3'
CB	16	(Iceland) Ívar Ingimarsson
LB	3	(England) Nicky Shorey
RM	19	(England) Liam Rosenior
CM	6	(Iceland) Brynjar Gunnarsson		(substituted off) 77'
CM	15	(England) James Harper
LM	10	(Republic of Ireland) Stephen Hunt
CF	9	(Republic of Ireland) Kevin Doyle
CF	12	(England) Dave Kitson
Substitutes:
GK	32	(Australia) Adam Federici
DF	22	(Cameroon) André Bikey
MF	20	(Ivory Coast) Emerse Faé		(substituted on) 77'
FW	8	(England) Leroy Lita
FW	24	(Republic of Ireland) Shane Long		(substituted on) 77'
Manager:
(England) Steve Coppell

== Post-match reaction ==
The first half was probably our best 45 minutes this season, but to come in having conceded in the last minute of the half allowed them back in... people say we only play one up front but today proved that it's really three and no-one deserves a hat-trick more than Benji.

— Portsmouth coach Joe Jordan

It's difficult to analyse a match like that and if you try you will be there a very long time ... we scored four goals away from home and had a chance for another with a penalty. We played a full part in the game – I don't think many teams will come here this season and score four.

— Reading manager Steve Coppell

== See also ==
- List of highest-scoring Premier League matches
