= List of highest-scoring Premier League matches =

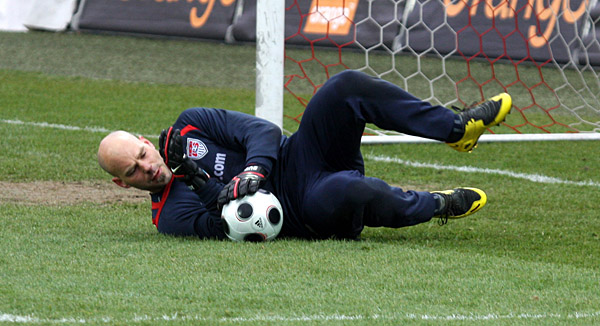
Reading were the losing team in both of the first two Premier League games in which ten goals were scored. Goalkeeper Marcus Hahnemann conceded a total of 13 goals in the two games.

This is a summary of the highest scoring matches and biggest winning margins in the Premier League since its establishment in the 1992–93 season. The record score for the biggest win is 9–0, which has happened on four occasions. The first was Manchester United beating Ipswich Town at Old Trafford on 4 March 1995, the second being Leicester City beating Southampton at St Mary's Stadium on 25 October 2019 (which stands as not only a joint Premier League record, but also an all-time record away win in the English football's top tier), the third being Manchester United beating Southampton on 2 February 2021, also at Old Trafford. The most recent occasion was Liverpool beating Bournemouth on 27 August 2022 at Anfield.

The only other team to have scored nine times in a match are Tottenham Hotspur, in their 9–1 victory over Wigan Athletic at White Hart Lane on 22 November 2009. This game boasts the record of total number of goals scored in one half of Premier League football (nine), and by one team in one half of Premier League football (eight, by Tottenham).

The highest scoring game is Portsmouth's 7–4 win against Reading at Fratton Park on 29 September 2007.

== Highest scoring games ==
Goals scored	Date	Home team	Result	Away team	Goalscorers	Ref.
11	29 September 2007	Portsmouth	7–4	Reading	Benjani 6', 37', 70', Hreiðarsson 55', Kranjčar 75', Ingimarsson 81' (o.g.), Muntari 90+2' (pen.); Hunt 45', Kitson 48', Long 79', Campbell 90+4' (o.g.)	
10	29 December 2007	Tottenham Hotspur	6–4	Reading	Berbatov 7', 63', 73', 83', Malbranque 76', Defoe 79'; Cissé 16', Ingimarsson 53', Kitson 69', 74'	
10	22 November 2009	Tottenham Hotspur	9–1	Wigan Athletic	Crouch 9', Defoe 51', 54', 58', 69', 87', Lennon 64', Bentley 88', Kranjčar 90'; Scharner 57'	
10	28 August 2011	Manchester United	8–2	Arsenal	Welbeck 22', Young 28', 90+1', Rooney 41', 64', 82' (pen.), Nani 67', Park 70'; Walcott 45+3', Van Persie 74'	
10	29 December 2012	Arsenal	7–3	Newcastle United	Walcott 20', 73', 90+2', Oxlade-Chamberlain 50', Podolski 64', Giroud 84', 87'; Ba 43', 69', Marveaux 59'	
10	19 May 2013	West Bromwich Albion	5–5	Manchester United	Morrison 40', Lukaku 50', 81', 86', Mulumbu 81'; Kagawa 6', Olsson 9' (o.g.), Büttner 30', Van Persie 53', Hernández 63'	
9	9 April 1994	Norwich City	4–5	Southampton	Robins 37', Goss 49', Sutton 56', 64'; Ullathorne 44' (o.g.), Le Tissier 58', 63' (pen.), 73', Monkou 90'	
9	4 March 1995	Manchester United	9–0	Ipswich Town	Keane 15', Cole 19', 37', 53', 65', 87', Hughes 55', 59', Ince 72' —	
9	26 October 1996	Southampton	6–3	Manchester United	Berkovic 6', 63', Le Tissier 34', Østenstad 45', 85', P.Neville 90' (o.g.); Beckham 41', May 56', Scholes 89'	
9	26 August 1997	Blackburn Rovers	7–2	Sheffield Wednesday	Gallacher 2', 7', Hyde 10' (o.g.), Wilcox 20', Sutton 24', 74', Bohinen 53'; Carbone 8', 47'	
9	6 February 1999	Nottingham Forest	1–8	Manchester United	Rogers 6'; Yorke 2', 67', Cole 7', 50', Solskjær 80', 88', 90', 90+1'	
9	12 February 2000	West Ham United	5–4	Bradford City	Sinclair 35', Moncur 43', Di Canio 65' (pen.), Cole 70', Lampard 83'; Windass 30', Beagrie 44' (pen.), Lawrence 47', 51'	
9	11 March 2000	Tottenham Hotspur	7–2	Southampton	Richards 28' (o.g.), Anderton 39', Armstrong 41', 64', Iversen 45', 78', 90'; Tessem 26', El Khalej 33'	
9	13 November 2004	Tottenham Hotspur	4–5	Arsenal	Naybet 37', Defoe 61', King 74', Kanouté 88'; Henry 45', Lauren 55' (pen.), Vieira 60', Ljungberg 69', Pires 81'	
9	11 May 2008	Middlesbrough	8–1	Manchester City	Downing 16' (pen.), 58' Alves 37', 60', 90', Johnson 70', Rochemback 80', Aliadière 85'; Elano 87'	
9	16 January 2010	Chelsea	7–2	Sunderland	Anelka 8', 65', Malouda 17', A.Cole 22', Lampard 34', 90', Ballack 52'; Zenden 56', Bent 90'	
9	14 December 2013	Manchester City	6–3	Arsenal	Agüero 14', Negredo 39', Fernandinho 50', 88', D.Silva 66', Touré 90' (pen.); Walcott 31', 63', Mertesacker 90'	
9	22 March 2014	Cardiff City	3–6	Liverpool	Mutch 9', 88', Campbell 25'; Suárez 16', 60', 90', Škrtel 41', 54', Sturridge 75'	
9	30 August 2014	Everton	3–6	Chelsea	Mirallas 45', Naismith 69', Eto'o 76'; Costa 1', 90', Ivanović 3', Coleman 67' (o.g.), Matić 74', Ramires 77'	
9	23 January 2016	Norwich City	4–5	Liverpool	Mbokani 29', Naismith 41', Hoolahan 54' (pen.), Bassong 90+2'; Firmino 18', 63', Henderson 55', Milner 75', Lallana 90+5'	
9	26 November 2016	Swansea City	5–4	Crystal Palace	Sigurðsson 36', Fer 66', 68', Llorente 90+1', 90+3'; Zaha 19', Tomkins 75', Cork 82' (o.g.), C.Benteke 84'	
9	4 February 2017	Everton	6–3	Bournemouth	Lukaku 1', 29', 83', 84', McCarthy 24', Barkley 90+4'; King 59', 70', Arter 90'	
9	14 October 2017	Manchester City	7–2	Stoke City	Gabriel Jesus 17', 55', Sterling 19', D.Silva 27', Fernandinho 60', Sané 62', B.Silva 79'; Diouf 44', Walker 47' (o.g.)	
9	13 May 2018	Tottenham Hotspur	5–4	Leicester City	Kane 7', 76', Lamela 49', 60', Fuchs 53' (o.g.); Vardy 4', 73', Mahrez 16', Iheanacho 47'	
9	25 October 2019	Southampton	0–9	Leicester City	— Chilwell 10', Tielemans 17', Pérez 19', 39', 57', Vardy 45', 58', 90+4' (pen.), Maddison 85'	
9	4 October 2020	Aston Villa	7–2	Liverpool	Watkins 4', 22', 39', McGinn 35', Barkley 55', Grealish 66', 75'; Salah 33', 60'	
9	2 February 2021	Manchester United	9–0	Southampton	Wan-Bissaka 18', Rashford 25', Bednarek 34' (o.g.), Cavani 39', Martial 69', 90', McTominay 71', Fernandes 88' (pen.), James 90+3' —	
9	26 December 2021	Manchester City	6–3	Leicester City	De Bruyne 5', Mahrez 14' (pen.), Gündoğan 21', Sterling 25' (pen.), 85', Laporte 69'; Maddison 55', Lookman 59', Iheanacho 65'	
9	27 August 2022	Liverpool	9–0	Bournemouth	Díaz 3', 85', Elliott 6', Alexander-Arnold 28', Firmino 31', 62', Van Dijk 45', Mepham 46' (o.g.), Carvalho 80' —	
9	2 October 2022	Manchester City	6–3	Manchester United	Foden 8', 44', 73', Haaland 34', 37', 64'; Antony 56', Martial 84', 90+1' (pen.)	
9	22 December 2024	Tottenham Hotspur	3–6	Liverpool	Maddison 41', Kulusevski 72', Solanke 83'; Díaz 23', 85', Mac Allister 36', Szoboszlai 45+1', Salah 54', 61'	
9	2 December 2025	Fulham	4–5	Manchester City	Smith Rowe 45+2', Iwobi 57', Chukwueze 72', 78'; Haaland 17', Reijnders 37', Foden 44', 48', Berge 54' (o.g.)	

== Biggest winning margin ==
Goals margin	Date	Home team	Result	Away team	Goalscorers	Ref
9	4 March 1995	Manchester United	9–0	Ipswich Town	Keane 15', Cole 19', 37', 53', 65', 87', Hughes 55', 59', Ince 72' —	
9	25 October 2019	Southampton	0–9	Leicester City	— Chilwell 10', Tielemans 17', Pérez 19', 39', 57', Vardy 45', 58', 90+4' (pen.), Maddison 85'	
9	2 February 2021	Manchester United	9–0	Southampton	Wan-Bissaka 18', Rashford 25', Bednarek 34' (o.g.), Cavani 39', Martial 69', 90', McTominay 71', Fernandes 88' (pen.), James 90+3' —	
9	27 August 2022	Liverpool	9–0	Bournemouth	Díaz 3', 85', Elliott 6', Alexander-Arnold 28', Firmino 31', 62', Van Dijk 45', Mepham 46' (o.g.), Carvalho 80' —	
8	19 September 1999	Newcastle United	8–0	Sheffield Wednesday	Hughes 11', Shearer 30', 33' (pen.), 42', 81', 84' (pen.), Dyer 48', Speed 78' —	
8	22 November 2009	Tottenham Hotspur	9–1	Wigan Athletic	Crouch 9', Defoe 51', 54', 58', 69', 87', Lennon 64', Bentley 88', Kranjčar 90'; Scharner 57'	
8	9 May 2010	Chelsea	8–0	Wigan Athletic	Anelka 6', 56', Lampard 32' (pen.), Kalou 54', Drogba 63', 68' (pen.), 80', A.Cole 90' —	
8	23 December 2012	Chelsea	8–0	Aston Villa	Torres 3', David Luiz 29', Ivanović 34', Lampard 59', Ramires 75', 90+1', Oscar 79' (pen.), Hazard 83' —	
8	18 October 2014	Southampton	8–0	Sunderland	Vergini 12' (o.g.), Pellè 18', 69', Cork 37', Bridcutt 63' (o.g.), Tadić 78', Wanyama 79', Mané 86' —	
8	21 September 2019	Manchester City	8–0	Watford	D.Silva 1', Agüero 7' (pen.), Mahrez 12', B.Silva 15', 48', 60', Otamendi 18', De Bruyne 85' —	
8	24 September 2023	Sheffield United	0–8	Newcastle United	— Longstaff 21', Burn 31', Botman 35', Wilson 56', Gordon 61', Almirón 68', Bruno Guimarães 73', Isak 87'	
